= Bellevue (Washington, D.C.) =

- Neighborhood
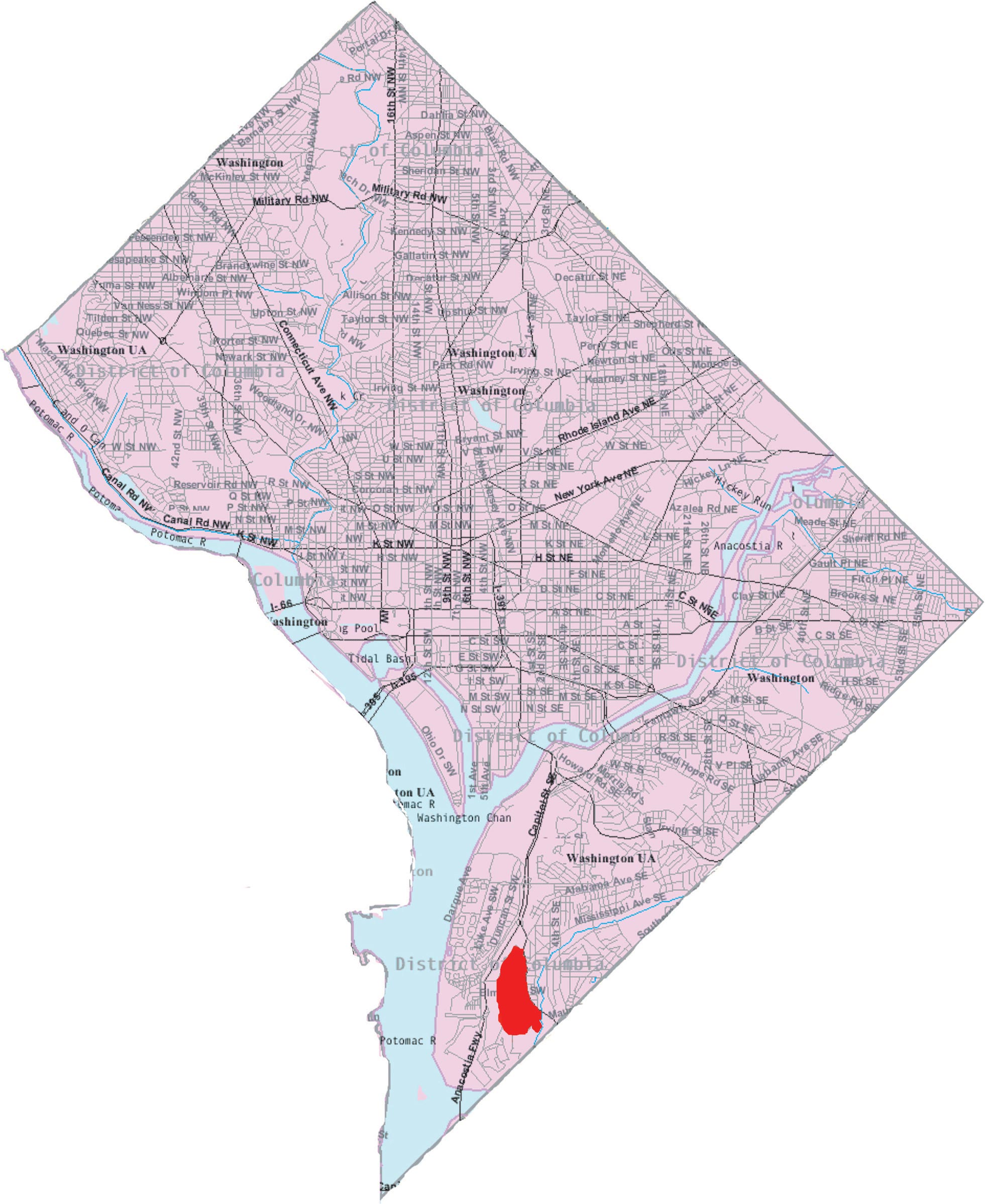
- Bellevue within Washington, D.C.
- Coordinates: 38°49′36″N 77°1′11″W
- Country: United States
- County: Washington (abolished in 1871)
- Federal district: District of Columbia
- Federal capital city: Washington, D.C. (from 1871)
- Ward: Ward 8
- Construction of Bellevue mansion: 1795

Government
  - Councilmember: Trayon White

Bellevue is a residential neighborhood in far Southeast and Southwest in Washington, D.C., United States. It is bounded by South Capitol Street, one block of Atlantic Street SE, and 1st Streets SE and SW to the north and east; Joliet Street SW and Oxon Run Parkway to the south; Martin Luther King Jr. Avenue SE, Shepherd Parkway, 2nd Street SW, and Xenia Street SW to the west. Bellevue was created from some of the earliest land patents in Maryland, and draws its name from a 1795 mansion built in the area. Subdivisions began in the 1870s, but extensive residential building did not occur until the early 1940s. Bellevue is adjacent to a number of federal and city agency buildings.

== About the neighborhood ==
=== Early land patents and creating Bellevue ===
On June 20, 1632, Charles I of England gave 12,000,000 acres (49,000 km^{2}) of land covering most of what is now the modern U.S. state of Maryland to Cecil Calvert, 2nd Baron Baltimore as a proprietary colony. The charter had originally been granted to Calvert's father, George Calvert, 1st Baron Baltimore, but the 1st Baron Baltimore died before it could be executed, so it was granted to his son instead. On September 4, 1663, a land patent was issued to Thomas Dent Sr. for a tract known as "Gisbrough". This tract was roughly in the area that is now Joint Base Anacostia–Bolling between Malcolm X Avenue SE/MacDill Boulevard SE and Giavannoli Street SW, the northern end of Bellevue, and the southern end of Congress Heights. On September 7, a land patent was issued to William Middleton for a tract known as "Berry". This smaller tract covered what is now the southern end of Joint Base Anacostia-Bolling and the southern part of Bellevue.

After Thomas Dent died in 1676, his widow married Colonel John Addison and had a son, Thomas, by him. Although Rebecca Dent-Addison had children by her first husband, her remarriage appears to have caused a family rift and she deeded Gisbrough to Thomas alone. Col. Addison enlarged his estate by purchasing two adjacent tracts, "The Pasture" and "Pencott's Invention", from step-son Peter Dent in December 1686. The stream Oxon Run and its banks were patented to Addison in 1687, and named "Glennings". Addison then purchased an extensive new estate, Oxon Hill, in 1695. (Note: Oxon Hill, originally named St. Elizabeth, was patented in 1662 by John Chirman (sometimes also listed as John Charman). He sold the estate Benjamin Rozer in 1667. Rozer sold it to William Becke in 1674. It may have passed through additional hands, but became Addison's property in 1695, along with another tract, Barnaby.)

"Berry", too, became part of the Addison family's holdings. William Middleton left "Berry" to his nephew, Richard Hanson. Hanson's descendant, Thomas Hawkins Hanson, married Thomas Addison's widow, taking possession of Berry as well as other property.

The Addison lands, including Gisbrough (later spelled "Gisborough" and "Giesborough"), stayed in the Addison family for the next century. In 1795, Walter Dulany Addison (who owned Oxon Hill) and John Addison (who owned Gisbrough) deeded 1,200 acres (4,900,000 m^{2}) of their land to their brother, Thomas Grafton Addison. He built a large home on a high point on the land, and named the mansion "Bellevue". (Note: Modern Bellevue encompasses a small portion of southeast Gisbrough, most of The Pasture, a small portion of western Glennings, and a small portion of the northeast edge of Berry.)

=== 19th-century Bellevue ===
Thomas Grafton Addison sold about half of Bellevue by 1826, and at his death the remainder was transferred to local planter Zacariah Berry Sr. to pay debts. Zacariah died in 1845, and deeded Bellevue to his grandsons, Washington Berry Jr. and Zacariah Berry Jr. Their father (and Zacariah Sr.'s son), Washington Berry Sr., managed Bellevue as a farm and operated a fisher from the site. When Washington Berry Sr. died in 1856, he will several plantations to his two sons provided they divested themselves of Bellevue to their five sisters. (Note: This included 42 acres (170,000 m^{2}) of the original Bellevue land which Thomas Grafton Addison had sold but which Washington Berry Sr. had repurchased.)

In 1860, members of the Berry family sued to have Washington Berry Sr.'s will overturned and Bellevue subdivided into numerous small lots and sold off. The court action was successful, but the American Civil War broke out before the court order could be enforced. Because Bellevue occupied high ground suitable for artillery, the U.S. federal government seized the property, demolished Bellevue mansion, and built Fort Greble (located west of the intersection of Martin Luther King Jr. Avenue SW and Elmira Street SW). All but the far southern part of Belleveue and all of Berry were surveyed and subdivided in 1863 by the government, and five of the seven lots (consisting of Bellevue) purchased by John Alexander Middleton and members of the Berry family. The land was resurveyed in 1867, and subdivided further. The Blue Plains estate and the far southern part of Bellevue were surveyed and subdivided in 1868. (They remained the property of Thomas W. Berry.) In the 1870s, the owners of Belleveue sold off various lots to members of the public.

In 1873, the U.S. federal government purchased 90 acres (360,000 m^{2}) of Bellevue (consisting of the western half of the old Berry tract) and added this land to the adjacent Naval Gun Factory. This land was known as the Bellevue Annex to the Naval Gun Factory until 1923, when the federal government opened the United States Naval Research Laboratory on the site. The laboratory remains on the tract in the 21st century.

=== 20th-century development ===
In 1906, the District of Columbia constructed the five-story Home for the Aged and the Infirm at Blue Plains, adjacent to the southeast corner of Bellevue. The facility fell into serious disrepair in the 1940s, and staffing issues became critical. The facility was renovated in the 1960s and renamed D.C. Village. A U-shaped complex of residential cottages, a new modern infirmary, an auditorium, and chapel were constructed at the site, and D.C. Village was lauded nationwide as a model elder-care facility. But in the 1970s, D.C. Village began admitting indigent and acute-care patients other nursing facilities could not care for. In 1980, the facility began accepted patients under the age of 60, essentially converting into an acute-care long-term care facility. Extensive financial problems and an exodus of staff led to a number of patient deaths and lawsuits. Courts ordered the facility to stop accepting new patients in 1993, and by 1996 D.C. Village had only 230 patients for its 800 beds. After years of political battles over the facility's future, D.C. Village closed in late 2007.

Most residential development occurred in the 1940s, as the farms and forests of Bellevue were transformed into two-bedroom residential townhouses for military personnel working at nearby Bolling Air Force Base.

In 1943, the first public school was built in Bellevue. This was Walter B. Patterson Elementary School, built on a site at Chesapeake Street SW and Nicholls Avenue SW (now Martin Luther King Jr. Avenue SW). Due to critical resource shortages caused by World War II, the structure was meant to be temporary. Despite its small size, more than 900 students crowded into it. Even the site was a poor one: Planes taking off from Bolling Field roared over the school, and school and military officials warned about damage to children's hearing and the potential for a plane crash. City officials wanted to build a much larger elementary school on the east side of Bellevue, on a site bounded by South Capitol Street, South Capitol Terrace, Danbury Street, and Elmira Street, but had no funds to do so. But local anger over the site was so great that just six months after the school opened, D.C. officials asked the federal government for $430,000 to build a new, permanent structure at the South Capitol Street site. The request was granted, and the school was open by fall 1946.

The 60-bed Hadley Memorial Hospital opened in Bellevue in 1952. The original owners sold it to Metropolitan Health Associates (a local group of physicians) in 1990, and sold again to a national group, Doctors Community Healthcare, in 2000. It was converted to a long-term acute-care nursing facility in 2001, and was renamed Bridgepoint Hospital-Hadley Campus after a 2006 sale.

Once a thriving commercial hub, Bellevue declined during the mass exodus of the middle-class from the District of Columbia in the 1960s. The District of Columbia Fire Department built its Fire Department Training Center on Shepherd Parkway SW near the southwest corner of the neighborhood.

On January 31, 1970, the city opened the Potomac Job Corps Center east of D.C. Village. In the fall of 1970, the Madeline V. Leckie Elementary School opened at the old Patterson Elementary site on Martin Luther King Jr. Avenue SW.

Bellevue lost most of its retail business in the 1980s, when a sharp rise in the use of crack cocaine in the city led to soaring crime rate. Another federal facility relocated adjacent to Bellevue when, in 1984, the Architect of the Capitol moved its Lanham Tree Nursery from Poplar Point to at vacant site at the intersection of Blue Plains Drive SW and Shepherd Parkway SW.

Poverty in the Bellevue neighborhood worsened from 1980 to 2000. The Bellevue/Congress Heights/Washington Highlands neighborhood cluster had a poverty rate of 26.1 percent in 1980. While the rate remained steady until 1990 (27.2 percent), it rose significantly to 34.0 by 2000. More than 46 percent of all children in the cluster were living in poverty. Only the Navy Yard neighborhood (poverty rate of 50.3 percent in 2000), the Buena Vista/Knox Hill/Garfield Heights/Woodland cluster (poverty rate of 47.3 percent in 2000), Barry Farm (poverty rate of 47.3 percent in 2000), and then Douglass/Shipley Terrace/Skyland cluster (poverty rate of 46.2 percent in 2000) had higher poverty rates in the city. In comparison, the poverty rate for all of Ward 8 was 38 percent, while the childhood poverty rate for the ward was greater than 50 percent. Numerically, the Bellevue/Congress Heights/Washington Highlands cluster had the second-most people living in poverty (10,270) of any area in the city. (The Columbia Heights/Mt. Pleasant cluster had the most residents in poverty [11,328], while the third-largest concentration was in the Crestwood/Petworth cluster [5,769].) The Bellevue/Congress Heights/Washington Highlands cluster also had the highest numerical concentration of African Americans in poverty (9,997).

=== 21st-century changes ===
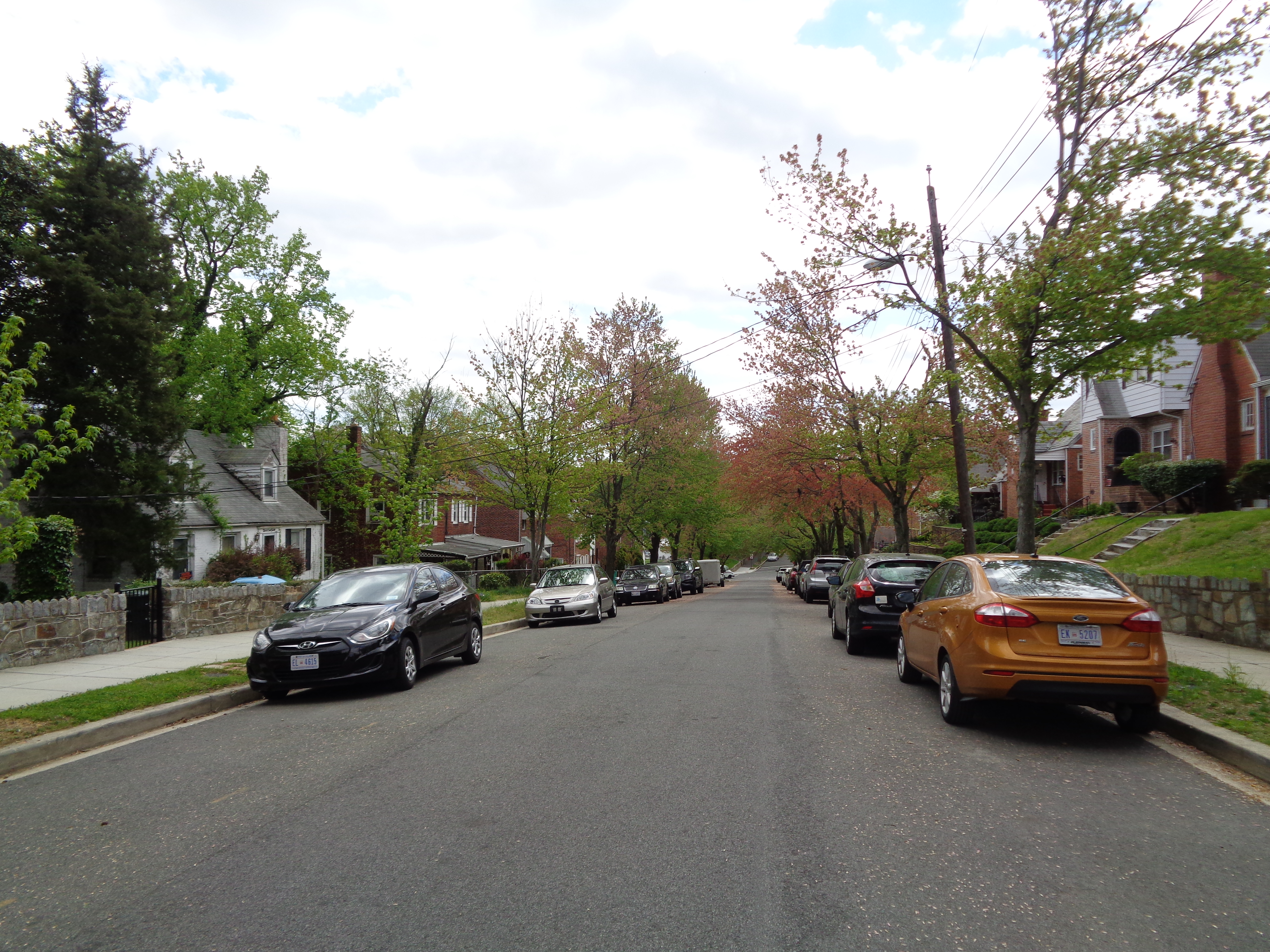
The intersection of 1st and Atlantic St. SW, in Bellevue

In 2005, a 119-unit condominium townhouse development, Danbury Station, opened on Danbury Street SW. Financed in part by the city, units ranged in price from the high $200,000s to the low $300,000s, and 24 units were offered at below-market rates to low-income people.

One analysis in 2013 indicated a neighborhood still undergoing decline. Researcher Emily Dimiero created a "gentrification index" which analyzed factors associated with gentrification, and concluded that from 2000 to 2010 the Bellevue/Congress Heights area had continued to decline. At the upper end of decline (dropping 14 to 12 percent) were Friendship Heights, Mayfair/Hillbrook, and Deanwood. In the second tier of decline (11 to 9 percent drops) were Van Ness (also called Forest Hills), Fairlawn/Twining, Congress Heights/Bellevue, and Eastland Gardens/Kenilworth.

However, some improvements in the area occurred after 2010. In 2011, a new Metropolitan Police Department Evidence Control Facility was constructed on D.C. Village Lane SW. Patterson Elementary School underwent a complete renovation in 2014. Community of Hope, a local nonprofit, opened the four-story, $26 million Conway Health and Resource Center at 4 Atlantic Street SW in January 2014. The medical center was the first healthcare clinic to open in the neighborhood. The District of Columbia provided $15 million to fund the center, with $6 million coming from the federal government, $1.75 million from billionaire William E. Conway Jr., and $2.75 million from other private donors. In 2015, the 49-unit Trinity Plaza mixed-use apartment and retail complex opened at the intersection of South Capitol and Atlantic Street SW. In 2015, a local real estate firm concluded that Bellevue is "on the cusp of new economic development growth." The firm pointed to redevelopment of the South Capitol Shopping Center into a mixed-use facility, construction of the new Bellevue/William O. Lockridge Public Library, completion of the Danbury Station and Trinity Plaza housing developments, streetscape changes, and abandoned-property seizures.

Crime in Bellevue remains persistently high post 2010, however. In 2014, the Bellevue/Congress Heights/Washington Highlands neighborhood cluster had the most incidents of violent crime (murder, rape, shootings, stabbings, assault) of any neighborhood cluster in the city. The Federal Bureau of Investigation ranked Bellevue/Washington Highlands the nation's 22nd most dangerous neighborhood. The following year, Bellevue/Congress Heights/Washington Highlands ranked second in the city (behind Columbia Heights/Mount Pleasant) for the most incidents of violent crime. Thirteen of the area's 375 incidents of violent crime were homicides, and 182 incidents were assaults. Crime statistics for Bellevue specifically show that the community had just 25 assaults, eight burglaries, and 14 robberies in 2015.

The combination of high crime and poverty meant that housing prices in the Bellevue/Congress Heights/Washington Highlands area were some of the most inexpensive in the city. The median price in 2013 for a one-bedroom apartment was $750, making the area the third least-expensive area of the city in which to rent an apartment.

In November 2016, The Washington Post described Bellevue as a neighborhood undergoing a positive transformation.

== About Bellevue ==
Bellevue overlooks Joint Base Anacostia-Bolling, and is just 10 minutes by car from the United States Capitol. Joint Base Anacostia-Bolling, the Naval Research Laboratory, the D.C. Fire Department Training Center, the D.C. Metropolitan Police Academy, the District of Columbia Water and Sewer Authority's Blue Plains Advanced Wastewater Treatment Plant, and the Architect of the Capitol's tree nursery are adjacent to Bellevue to the west. The neighborhood is overwhelmingly residential, with most housing consisting of detached single-family homes. Most of the housing in the area was built in the 1940s.

Mezzo-soprano opera singer Denyce Graves grew up on Galveston Street SW (now Gainesvilla Street SW) in the Bellevue neighborhood.

=== Library ===
In 2009, work began on a $15 million replacement for the Washington Highlands Library. The new building was designed by architect David Adjaye. The D.C. Public Library board of trustees voted in July 2011 to rename the new building Bellevue after the neighborhood where it is located. But in September 2011, D.C. Mayor Vincent C. Gray introduced legislation to rename the building after William O. Lockridge, a local community activist who died in January 2011. The library board and a local group, Friends of the Bellevue Library, opposed the renaming, pointing out that Lockridge advocated sharply reduced library spending in favor of more welfare programs. The Council of the District of Columbia, however, approved Gray's bill. After three months of political wrangling, the library was formally named the William O. Lockridge/Bellevue Library, and it opened on June 13, 2012.

=== Playgrounds ===
The federal government turned Fort Greble over to the District of Columbia in the late 1930s, and in October 1942 the District government began construction of a playground on the site. Common-use buildings were added and the playground upgraded to a recreation center in the mid 1960s. These building were temporarily closed in 1995 when a city budget crisis left the District of Columbia Department of Parks and Recreation with too few staff to keep them open. In 2012, the District government announced a $30 million program to upgrade a number of playgrounds and recreation centers throughout the city. The improved recreation site, which now included a community garden, a splash pad, outdoor classroom space, new picnic tables and outdoor grills, and renovated basketball court and bleachers, opened in August 2013.

About 1948, the National Capital Planning Commission opened a second playground in Bellevue, the Bald Eagle Recreation Center. The recreation center received renovations from private groups and a donation from the campaign of Mayor Marion Barry in February 1995. A dance studio was added in 1996, and the center underwent a major city-financed renovation and refurbishment in 2001. A literacy center opened at Bald Eagle in 2004. The recreation center was due for a $2.5 million renovation in 2011, but the city rescinded this spending item and agreed to spend only $1 million. In 2012, the city spent $7 million on the Bald Eagle Recreation Center. New facilities included the Dr. Arnold W. McKnight Boxing Annex, a 6,600-square-foot (610 m^{2}) gymnasium with boxing ring, fitness center, locker rooms, and showers.

== Bibliography ==
- Branch-Miles, Nathania A.; Thomas, Jane Taylor (2006). Oxon Hill. Charleston, S.C.: Arcadia Publishing. ISBN 9780738542553.
- Castle, Guy (1953–1956). "Gisborough as a Land Grant, Manor and Residence of the Dents, Addisons, Shaaffs and Youngs". Records of the Columbia Historical Society, Washington, D.C.: 282–292.
- Castle, Guy (1963–1965). "Blue Plains and Bellevue: Two Early Plantations of the Washington Area". Records of the Columbia Historical Society, Washington, D.C.: 19–31.
- Castle, Guy (1963–1965). "The Washington Area Between 1608 and 1708, With a Biographical Note on Prince George of Denmark". Records of the Columbia Historical Society, Washington, D.C.: 1–18.
- Chorlton, Thomas Patrick (2011). The First American Republic, 1774-1789: The First Fourteen American Presidents Before Washington. Bloomington, Ind.: AuthorHouse. ISBN 9781456753887.
- Kellock, Katherine A. (1962). Colonial Piscataway in Maryland. Accokeek, Md.: Alice Ferguson Foundation.
- Lloyd, Daniel Boone (1975). The Middletons and Kindred Families of Southern Maryland. Bethesda, Md.: Lloyd.
- Marye, William (June 1938). "The Annacostin Indian Fort" (PDF). Maryland Historical Magazine: 134–148.
- Newman, Harry Wright (1971). Charles County Gentry: A Genealogical History of Six Emigrants - Thomas Dent, John Dent, Richard Edelen, John Hanson, George Newman, Humphrey Warren. Baltimore, Md.: Genealogical Publishing Co. ISBN 9780806304861.
- Rubin, Mark (October 2002). 2000 Census Numbers Reveal Higher Poverty Numbers in the District by Ward and Neighborhood Cluster (Report). Washington, D.C.: DC Agenda.
- Scharf, J. Thomas (1882). History of Western Maryland: Being a History of Frederick, Montgomery, Carroll, Washington, Allegany, and Garrett Counties From the Earliest Period to the Present Day, Including Biographical Sketches of Their Representative Men. Volume I. Philadelphia: L.H. Everts.
- Sparks, Jared (1846). The Library of American Biography: George Calvert, the First Lord Baltimore. Boston: Charles C. Little and James Brown. "Leonard Calvert."
