= Oxon Run Park =

Municipal park in Washington, D.C.

- Interactive map of Oxon Run Park
- Type: Municipal Park
- Location: Washington, DC
- Coordinates: 38°50′5″N 77°00′2″W
- Area: 106 acres (43 ha)
- Created: 1971
- Operator: DC Department of Park and Recreation

Oxon Run Park is a recreational park in Southeast Washington, D.C., that features sports areas, trails, playgrounds and the Southeast Tennis and Learning Center. The park was created in 1971 from land that was previously part of the federally-controlled Oxon Run Parkway.

== Location ==
Situated in the southernmost part of the District of Columbia, Oxon Run Park is located along Oxon Run, between the Washington Highlands neighborhood on the east and Congress Heights and Bellevue neighborhoods on the west. It is entirely within the SE quadrant of the city, and is primarily bounded by 13th St., Valley Ave., Livingston Rd., South Capitol St., 1st St., Wayne Pl. and Mississippi Ave. An additional tract, located north of Mississippi Avenue, surrounds the old Mildred Green School and consists of steeply sloping undeveloped land.

== History ==
Oxon Run Park was created in 1971 when the National Capitol Planning Commission (NCPC) transferred 300 acres of federal parkland from the National Park Service to the District government, which was part of a larger 700 acre transfer that included Watts Branch, Pope Branch and most of the Oxon Run Parkway. This was added to a smaller plot of land located between 4th and 6th along Mississippi Avenue, transferred in 1942, that served as the Oxon Run Recreation Center. The transferred land along Oxon Run became Oxon Run Park. Prior to the 1960s, the federal government had resisted turning parks over to the city because they were concerned that once the parks became local they would be segregated, but as segregation ended, that concern faded away. The final justification of the transfer was that NCPC and city planners thought that a municipal agency would show more concern for local recreational needs than a federal one would. There was also hope that it would spur the creation of a District parks department as Washington, DC was the only major city in the country without one and at the time the transportation department took control.

The Parkway, from which the Park was carved, traced its origins to 1924 when Congress created the NCPPC to create a park and playground system for the National Capital. In the 1930s NCPPC began purchasing narrow strips of land along the shores of the stream for the park. After a 1937 flood, NCPPC decided to purchase 144 additional acres of land in the valley from the District line to the Camp Simms rifle range north of 14th. The land would widen the Parkway above the high water mark, thus preventing the construction of homes that might be prone to flooding. Expansion continued through the 1930s and 1940s. In 1944 the Parkway extended across the entire District, with the exception of the portion within Camp Simms. The Camp Simms section was added to the Parkway in 1958. The portion of the Parkway west of 13th as well as a portion of the Camp Simms land constituted the land that was transferred to create Oxon Run Park.

In 1942, prior to creation of the park, the city took control of a small plot of land for a recreation center and built a playground on it. In 1948, both the school board and recreation board authorized the construction of a new school, Simon Elementary, on part of the recreation center land. In 1967, Vice President Hubert Humphrey dedicated the pool in the recreation center which had recently been completed.

Plans to improve the park began in 1975 as part of a major erosion and flood control project proposed for the park. Four years later, Ward 8 Councilmember Wilhelmina Rolark and the District's Department of Recreation and Environmental Services joined efforts to create a master plan for the park. The District secured a $450,000 federal grant to fund the planned improvements, but lacked the matching funds to use the money until 1984, when improvements began. Meanwhile, planning continued through 1983, with the final version completed in 1984. Over the next year, the park improvements built included miles of jogging and bike trail, picnic areas, and ball fields, an amphitheatre, basketball and tennis courts, and a nature trail.

In 2000, after several years of planning, fundraising and promotion by Mayor Marion Barry and his wife Cora, the District opened the Southeast Tennis and Learning Center in the park, next to Hart Junior High School.

From 1995 to 2001, part of the 3.6 acre section of the park located on the north side of Mississippi Avenue next to the Mildred Green Elementary School was used as construction staging for the Metro's Green Line. Two Green Line tunnels were built beneath this plot and WMATA constructed a vent shaft on it that took about 0.1 acres of the park.

In 2002, as part of Make a Difference Day, about 300 White House volunteers joined by Secretary of Commerce Donald Evans and then Miss America Erika Harold, built a 4000 square foot playground in the park.

== Oxon Run Trails ==
A central feature of Oxon Run Park are the Oxon Run trails, which consist of 3.4 miles of trail on both sides of Oxon Run from South Capitol Street SE to 13th Street SE.

The concept for trails along Oxon Run date back to the 1965 effort to plan an area-wide trail system as part of the Department of the Interior's nationwide trail study. The plan included 20 trails, including a trail along Oxon Run and the Suitland Parkway that would connect Andrews Air Force Base to the Potomac. As a result, the National Park Service sought funding for 3 miles of trail in its 1968 budget.

The trail became part of local planning in 1975 when DC officials began planning improvements to the Park as part of a major erosion and flood control project, but though the plan was completed in 1979, and federal funding set aside in 1980, work didn't begin for many years because of local funding limitations. The park plan called for several miles of jogging and bike trails. Work on the trails began in 1984 and finished the next year. It included 2.5 miles of trail and 5 pedestrian bridges over the stream. In 2010, the District of Columbia created plans to rehabilitate, expand and improve the trails. Work on the trail rebuild began in 2016 with a ribbon cutting in 2018. The project added nearly a mile of trail and a new trail crossing of Oxon Run just south of the South Capitol Street Bridge. The project widened and straightened the trails, expanded them to both sides of the stream throughout the whole park, improved street crossings, made ADA-required changes, added wayfinding signs, and extended it along South Capitol Street to the Maryland boundary where someday they intend for it to connect, via a new trail, to the Oxon Creek Trails.

== Facilities ==
In addition to the trails, Oxon Run Park features several other amenities. It has baseball fields, basketball courts, an amphitheater, playgrounds, picnic pavilions, the Southeast Tennis and Learning Center and the Oxon Run Pool.
