= Shepherd Parkway =

Parkway in Washington, DC

- Location within District of Columbia
- Location: District of Columbia
- Nearest city: Washington, D.C.
- Coordinates: 38°49′56.5″N 77°00′46.6″W
- Area: 205.51 acres (0.8317 km^{2})
- Established: 1927
- Governing body: National Capital Parks-East, National Park Service

Shepherd Parkway is part of the Civil War Defenses of Washington. It includes two forts (Forts Greble and Carroll), of which some remains still exist. The parkway runs along the high ground opposite the Anacostia Freeway (Interstate 295) from Joint Base Anacostia–Bolling in the District of Columbia. Shepherd Parkway is bordered on the north by St. Elizabeths Campus and the District of Columbia neighborhoods of Congress Heights and Bellevue and on the south (near Oxon Run) by Bald Eagle Hill.

== History ==
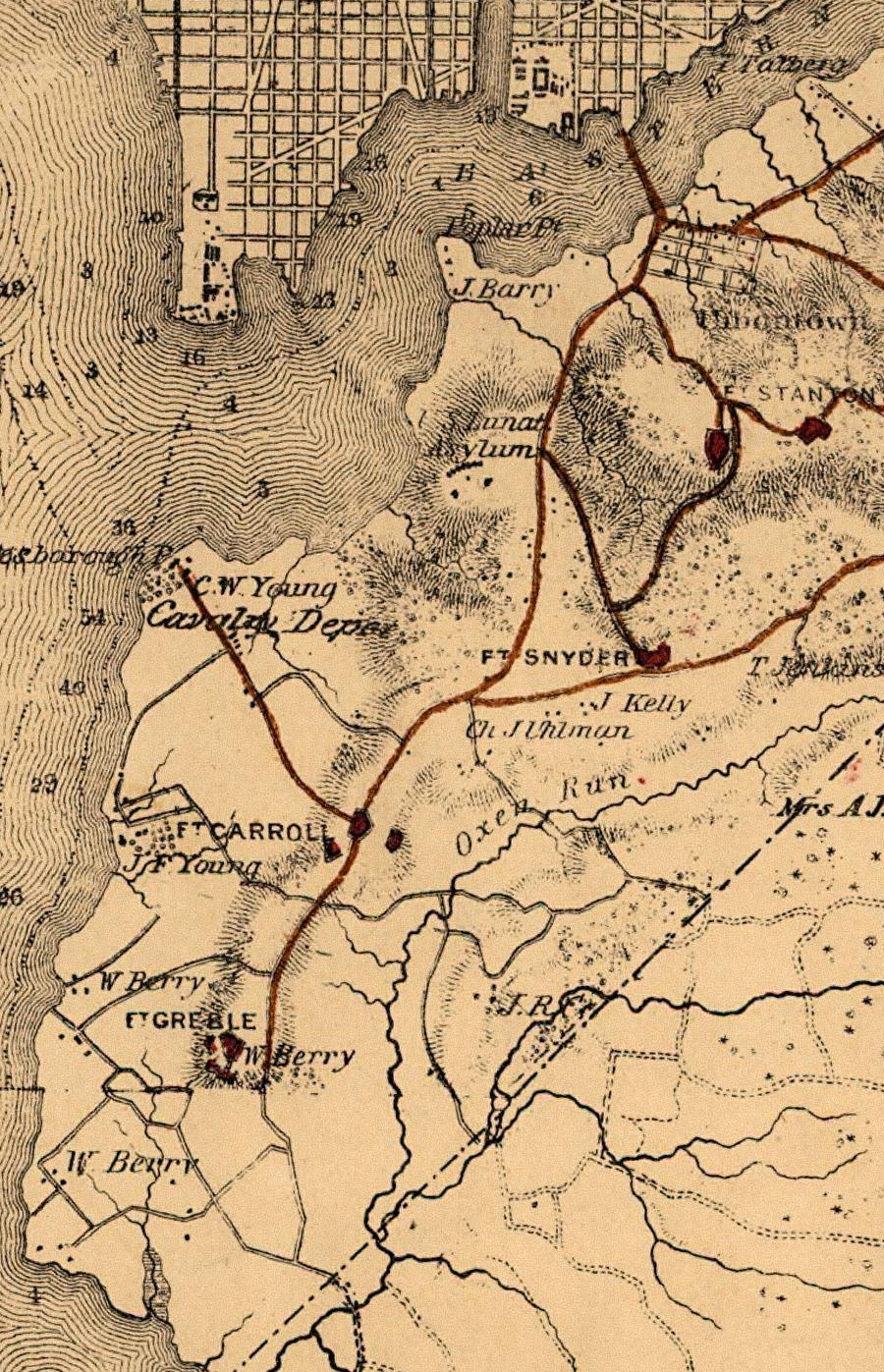
1865 map of the Shepherd Parkway area; Fort Greble is near the southern end and Fort Carroll near the midpoint.

The National Capital Parks and Planning Commission began acquiring land in 1927 for a parkway, Fort Drive, to connect a ring of parks made up of Civil War defenses around the city. Shepherd Parkway was the first land acquired; although the parkway was never completed, the land remains urban open space.

Alexander Robey Shepherd was Washington's second governor. A native Washingtonian and veteran of the Civil War, he was successful in the plumbing and gas-fitting industries. As governor, he paved roads in the city and developed a sewage system. Shepherd Parkway may have been named for Shepherd, who encouraged the Baltimore and Ohio Railroad to extend a line through Giesborough south over the Potomac River to Alexandria, Virginia.

=== Civil War ===
At the beginning of the American Civil War in 1861, George Washington Young offered to sell his land to the government for $100,000. Although his offer was declined, the Union army rented the land for $6,000 per year. The following year, Young freed his slaves when the DC Compensated Emancipation Law was enacted.

Sixty-eight fortifications were built to defend Washington (the Union Army headquarters) from Confederate attack. Shepherd Parkway was used for fortifications, military roads, the Camp Stoneman cavalry camp (named for Cavalry Bureau chief George Stoneman) and hospitals (Saint Elizabeth and another, near Fort Carroll).

Fort Carroll, named for West Point graduate Samuel Sprigg Carroll, was established on the ridge southeast of Giesboro Point. The large fort, a headquarters for soldiers east of the Anacostia River, was built to protect the cavalry depot and the Washington Arsenal and Navy Yard. With a capacity of more than 30,000 horses, Fort Carroll had hospital and administration buildings and barracks.

Fort Greble was named for John T. Greble, who was killed in the June 10, 1861 Battle of Big Bethel. The fort, at the southern end of the Shepherd Parkway ridge, protected the Potomac (including the ravines along Oxen Run and Piscataway Road, now Martin Luther King Avenue). Both forts were used for training.

Fugitive slaves, considered "contraband of war" and living in nearby camps, helped build and maintain the forts. After the enactment of the Thirteenth Amendment to the United States Constitution, which outlawed slavery, many remained nearby and by the end of the century the area had a number of African-American communities.

=== 1866 to 1900 ===
At the end of the war, the Freedmen's Bureau purchased the Barry farm north of St. Elizabeths Hospital and divided the land into 1 acre (0.40 ha) lots. The area remained farmland, and the lots were sold to former slaves; within two years, 500 families owned property.

The government decommissioned the cavalry camp, returning the Giesborough land to George Washington Young. Young could not sell his buildings and property, and after his 1867 death his heirs gradually sold the property. A river resort, Buena Vista, was established at Giesborough Point and Fort Carroll was transferred to the Signal Corps. Fort Greble was demolished and its building materials sold at auction.

The city's population had doubled during the war, and its infrastructure was strained. In 1871 Pierre L'Enfant's plan was still in its infancy, and many politicians wanted to move the nation's capital west. The District of Columbia Organic Act of 1871 repealed the individual charters of Georgetown and the city of Washington, combining them with Washington County in a new charter—the first step towards district government.

=== Early 20th century ===
Senator James McMillan of Michigan saw a need for improvements in the city, and the McMillan Plan was created to develop a system of parks in the district (including a parkway connecting the forts). On April 11, 1927, the National Capital Parks and Planning Commission acquired Shepherd Parkway as its first property for its proposed Fort Drive. The plan became a casualty of the Great Depression until 1933, when the New Deal turned most public green space to the National Park Service. The parkway was never constructed, and the land was used for anti-aircraft artillery and military barracks.

== Present day ==
Today, Shepherd Parkway is 205.51 acres (0.8317 km^{2}) of mature trees along the ridge. It has no marked or maintained trails, picnic areas or playgrounds. Until recently the parkway was neglected, with trash and invasive species, but community organizations are attempting to clean and restore it. Shepherd Parkway and Forts Carroll and Greble are administered by National Capital Parks-East.
