= National Capital Parks-East =

National Park Service sites in the United States

- Location within the United States Location within the District of Columbia
- Location: Washington, D.C.; Maryland, U.S.
- Coordinates: 38°52′42″N 76°58′9″W
- Area: 6,546.92 acres (26.4944 km^{2}) federal: 6,482.78 acres (26.2349 km^{2}) including National Mall and Memorial Parks
- Established: 1965
- Visitors: 1,249,158 (in 2025)
- Governing body: National Park Service

National Capital Parks-East (NACE) is an administrative grouping of multiple National Park Service sites east of the United States Capitol in Washington, D.C., and in the state of Maryland. These sites include:

- Anacostia Park
- Baltimore-Washington Parkway
- Buzzard Point Park and Buzzard Point Marina
- Capitol Hill Parks
- Carter G. Woodson Home National Historic Site
- Civil War Defenses of Washington – Fort Circle Parks – Includes the Civil War Forts and interconnecting parkways from Fort Greble to Fort Mahan.
  - Fort Davis Park
  - Fort Dupont Park
  - Fort Foote Park
  - Fort Stanton
- Fort Washington Park
- Frederick Douglass National Historic Site
- Greenbelt Park
- Harmony Hall
- James Creek Marina
- Kenilworth Park and Aquatic Gardens
- Mary McLeod Bethune Council House National Historic Site
- Oxon Cove Park and Oxon Hill Farm
- Oxon Run Parkway (affiliated area)
- Piscataway Park
- Shepherd Parkway
- Suitland Parkway

== NPS Visitor Contact Facilities ==
The headquarters of NACE is located in Anacostia Park at 1900 Anacostia Drive, SE. It is not a visitor center, but has an information desk in the lobby and is open to the public 9:00 AM – 4:00 PM, Monday through Friday.

Fort Washington Park has a Visitor Center that is open daily 9:00 AM – 5:00 PM, April through October. The rest of the year, it closes at 4:00 PM.

Frederick Douglass NHS is open daily 9:00 AM – 5:00 PM, April through October. The rest of the year, it closes at 4:30 PM.

Greenbelt Park Ranger Station is open daily 8:00 AM to 3:45 PM. The Park Headquarters is open five days a week 8:00 AM to 3:45 PM.

Kenilworth Aquatic Gardens bookstore and visitor center is open daily 9:00 AM to 3:00 PM.

Kenilworth Park and Kenilworth Aquatic Gardens grounds are open 8:00 AM to 4:00 PM.

Mary McLeod Bethune Council House NHS is open daily 9:00 AM – 5:00 PM, April through October. The rest of the year, it closes at 4:30 PM.
