= 2018 Wayne Place murder case =

Criminal case in Washington, D.C., United States

In April 2018, an abandoned address at Southeast Wayne Place in Washington, D.C. was found to contain the remains of three missing women, Jewel Marquita King, Verdell Jefferson, and Dorothy Jean Butts, who all disappeared in 2006. The case remains unsolved.

== Case history ==
On April 13, 2006, 48-year-old Jewel Marquita King, a mother of three daughters, was reported missing. 41-year-old Verdell Jefferson went missing on August 1, and 43-year-old Dorothy Jean Butts went missing on Christmas Day. Both Jefferson and Butts were each survived by their respective sons.

In April 2018, construction workers were working at an abandoned retail property on Southeast Wayne Place. The remains of one of the victims was found in the house's crawl space, resulting in the police being called. A search of the property revealed a shallow grave, where the remains of the other two women were found buried. They were identified as King, Jefferson, and Butts. The causes of death for King and Butts were determined to be shooting, while Jefferson's cause of death was determined to be blunt-force trauma. Police have appealed to the public for tips, and monetary rewards have been offered for information.

== See also ==
- List of serial killers in the United States
