= Goose Island (Washington, D.C.) =

Vanishing island located in southwest Washington, D.C

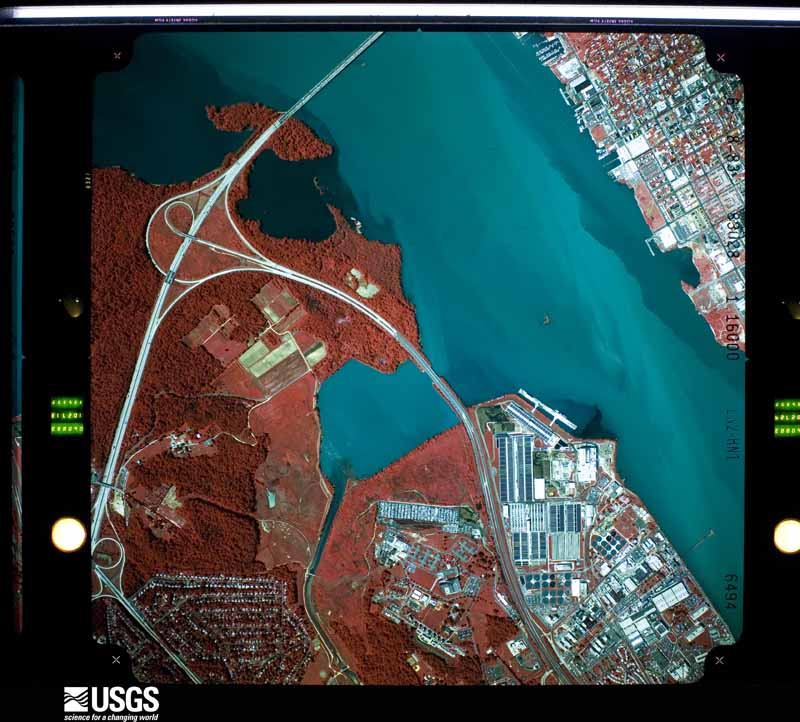
- 1983 false-color aerial photograph of the Potomac River. The small red speck, and the visible sandbar to its left, are parts of Goose Island. South is up and north is down.
- Interactive map of Goose Island

Geography
- Location: Potomac River, Washington, D.C.
- Coordinates: 38°48′30.4″N 77°01′47.9″W
- Total islands: 3

Administration
- United States

Demographics
- Population: 0

Goose Island is a vanishing island located in the Potomac River in the southwest quadrant of Washington, D.C., in the United States. It is a rarely above-water mudflat located at the mouth of Oxon Creek, roughly between Oronoco Bay in Alexandria and Marbury Point (Shepherds Landing), now part of the Blue Plains water treatment plant.

National Oceanic and Atmospheric Administration nautical charts indicate that Goose Island sits within a shallow area, extending south past the Woodrow Wilson Bridge into Maryland, that is used to deposit dredging spoils.
