= Oxon Run =

Stream in Maryland, USA

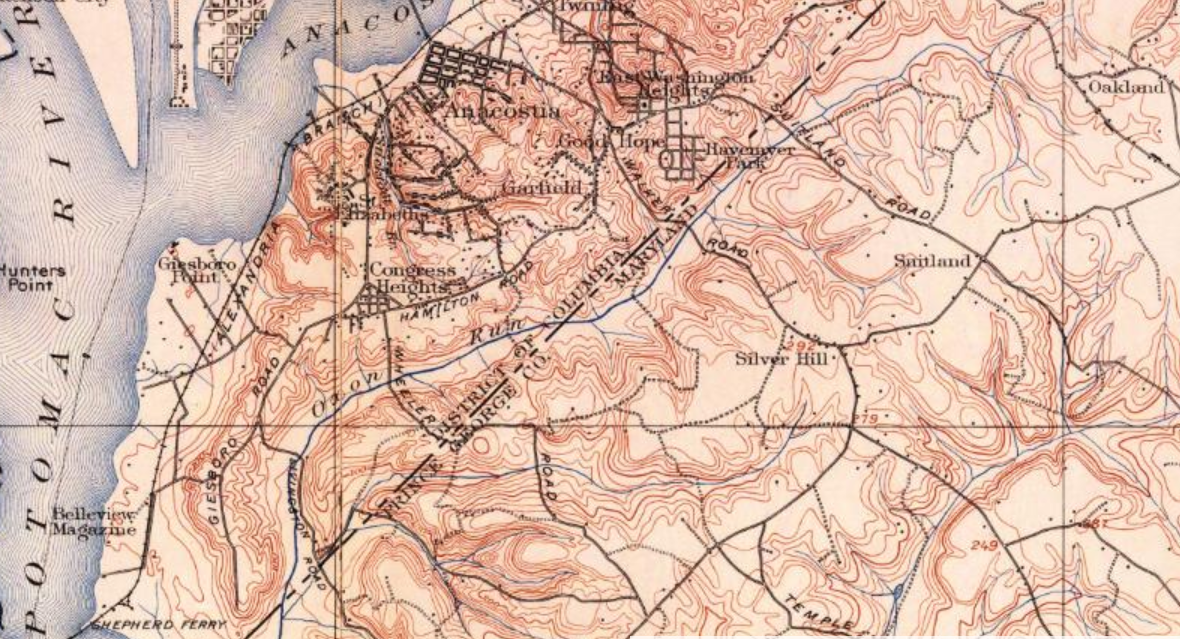
- Oxon Run in 1900

Location
- Country: United States
- State: Maryland, District of Columbia
- Counties: MD: Prince George's; DC: City of Washington

Physical characteristics
- Source
  - location: Coral Hills, MD
  - coordinates: 38.859177°N 76.913568°W
- Mouth
  - location: Oxon Creek
  - coordinates: 38.8170718°N 77.0068699°W
- Length: 7 miles (11 km)
- Basin size: 5,312 acres (21.50 km^{2})
- Width
  - minimum: 10 Feet
  - maximum: 85 feet
- Depth
  - average: 2.2 feet
- Discharge
  - average: 392 cfs

Basin features
- River system: Potomac River
- Landmarks: Naylor Road Station, Oxon Run Parkway

Oxon Run is a tributary stream of Oxon Creek and the Potomac River in Prince George's County, Maryland, and Washington, D.C.

In early maps, the stream was usually called "Oxen Run"; in 1892, the U.S. Geological Survey still labeled the stream as "Oxen Run" on its maps. Late that year, they changed the spelling they used, and others followed suit, though it's unclear what led to the spelling change.

Government officials and mapmakers often do not distinguish between Oxon Creek and Oxon Run, instead treating Oxon Creek as a continuation of Oxon Run, but USGS still does. USGS first started labeling it as Oxon Creek in 1892.

== Geography ==
The headwater of the stream originates in the Coral Hills area of Prince George's County near Francis Scott Key Elementary School. From there, it flows west and then south for 7 miles (11 km) to a confluence with Barnaby Run (sometimes known as Winkle Doodle Run), forming Oxon Creek, which drains to the Potomac River and the Chesapeake Bay. The watershed area of Oxon Run is about 5,312 acres (21.50 km^{2}) in Prince George's County and 3,968 acres (16.06 km^{2}) in Washington. Some consider Oxon Creek to be a continuation of Oxon Run, but USGS considers them separate streams.

The stream flows mostly through open land in Prince George's County. It first flows through Coral Hills to a stormwater management pond near Seton Way, where it combines with water from a storm drainpipe that empties the Penn Station Shopping Center parking lot. From there, it flows through a floodplain forest north of Pennsylvania Avenue interrupted by a concrete box culvert under Brooks Drive; a series of galvanized steel culverts under private property, a church parking lot, and Quarter Avenue; and, at the end of the forest, through a concrete-lined channel beside and beneath Pennsylvania Avenue. South of Pennsylvania Ave, it runs along the edge of Cedar Hill and Lincoln Memorial cemeteries before passing through a strip of parkland including Suitland Parkway and Oxon Run Valley Park at the same time passing under the Suitland Parkway at Naylor Road and then under Southern Avenue, into D.C.

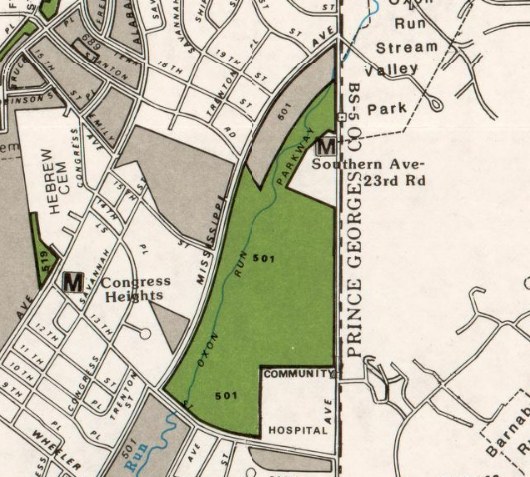
Map of the Oxon Run Parkway

Once in D.C., the stream flows through parkland. Upon entering D.C., it flows through the Oxon Run Parkway managed by the National Park Service. The parkway contains four northern magnolia bogs, the only ones on Park Service land, and is primarily made up of land from Camp Simms. The stream then flows through Oxon Run Park, which is in a concrete-lined channel. After passing under South Capitol Street, it flows through a natural channel between NPS's forested Bald Eagle Hill and a former landfill site owned by D.C. Just inside the D.C. Boundary, it meets with Barnaby Run and becomes Oxon Creek. Within D.C., there are approximately 38 sewersheds with storm drain outfalls discharging into Oxon Run.

Oxon Run was originally a meandering riffle-pool-type sequence stream with a gravel or sand bed. However, in the 20th century, it was changed by flood control projects and significant urbanization of its watershed. In addition, many of its tributaries have been converted to storm drains.

== History ==
Until the 20th century, the Oxon Run watershed was a lightly settled valley filled with plantations, farms, and orchards. Initially a part of Maryland, it was split between the District of Columbia and Maryland when the former was created in 1800. In 1855 much of it was owned by the District's largest enslaver, George Washington Young, as a part of Nonesuch Plantation, and the Young family owned the land for generations starting in the 18th century. Within the District, Oxon Run was contained within Washington County until the whole of the District was unified in 1871. There were dozens of properties and many owners in the valley, some of whose names are reflected in local street names, most notably Wheeler Road and Livingston Road.

The first boom in the valley came during the American Civil War. The U.S. Army built forts on the hills above Oxon Run, and the expansion of the population of the city led to the extension of formal roads into the valley. Wheeler Road, named for Colonel J.H. Wheeler, was extended across the stream in 1870, and two years later the first bridge was built across it to serve the road. Additional roads and bridges were built across the stream around the same time forming Marlboro Road, Suitland Road, Livingston Mill Road (later shortened to Livingston Road and then partially renamed Atlantic Avenue) and Walker Road (later named Naylor Road). All were built during the post Civil War boom and all were in place by 1878.

The plantations, orchards, and dairy farms that filled the valley eventually gave way to the city's needs. The first developments to encroach on the valley were a pair of cemeteries and a military base. In 1895, the Cedar Hill Cemetery was founded as Forest Lake Cemetery along the east bank of the stream north of Suitland Road, and in 1904, the military established a firing range that straddled the stream in DC as part of Camp Simms. Nonetheless, in 1912, the stream was still described as flowing through a "gentle, graceful valley...between steep, wooded hills." In 1927, Lincoln Memorial Cemetery was established just south of the Cedar Hill Cemetery on the south side of Suitland Road. It was the second cemetery in the Washington area to admit African-Americans and is the oldest one remaining. Quarter Avenue in Maryland was built across the stream before 1938. Even with these changes, the watershed remained predominantly rural until World War II.

In the 1920s, Congress took steps to preserve much of the green space outside the old city of Washington, with a special focus on the stream and river valleys, including Oxon Run. In 1924, Congress created the National Capital Park and Planning Commission (NCPPC) to create a park and playground system for the National Capital, and by 1926, they had begun making plans for a "parkway" or park system that would include land in the Oxon Run valley. By 1930, NCPPC had begun purchasing narrow strips of land along the shores of the stream for the "Oxon Run Parkway." This coincided with a report from NCPPC identifying Oxon Run as a possible water source for Maryland. The report stated that a sewer would be needed through the valley to protect the waters of Oxon Run from pollution. After a 1937 flood of Oxon Run, NCPPC decided to widen the parkway by purchasing more land in the valley between the District line and the Camp Simms rifle range. This prevented the construction of homes in the floodplain and allowed for the construction of the sewer project, the Oxon Run interceptor, that was completed in 1939. NCPC continued buying land in the valley from 1939 to 1944. By the end of 1944, the Parkway extended across the entire District, with the exception of the portion within Camp Simms. The use of the Camp Simms firing range ended in 1953 due to urban encroachment. In 1958, the Defense Department transferred the land to the General Services Administration, and later 94 acres of the site was added to the Oxon Run Parkway. In the 1960s an unlined landfill was constructed along the east bank just south of South Capitol Street which was intended to become recreational space but never did.

Following World War II, the preservation of the valley was extended into Maryland. In 1946, President Truman signed an amendment to the Capper-Crampton Act, which, among other things, called for the Oxon Run valley to be preserved from the District line to the Marlboro Pike (then known as Marlboro Road). By 1953, M-NCPPC had acquired 5 acres along the stream in Maryland and planned to acquire another 367. 17 additional acres were purchased in 1955 and that land used to build the Hillcrest Heights Recreation Center. In 1961, M-NCPPC acquired the Oxon Run Golf Course, located on the north side of Oxon Run between 23rd and 28th Avenue in Hillcrest Heights, and operated it until it was closed in June 1986. The 9-hole course, the first public one in Prince George's County, was built in 1954.

While the land around it was preserved, Oxon Run was channelized and straightened for flood control. Sections near the Potomac and along Cedar Hill and Lincoln Memorial Cemeteries were channelized before World War II. The stream in the Suitland Parkway was channelized by 1949, and in 1959, as part of the work extending Pennsylvania Avenue, the stream was realigned and placed in a concrete-line channel. After Tropical Storm Agnes caused extensive flooding in the valley in 1972, 2,800 feet of the stream was dredged. The largest channelization project came in 1978 and 1979 when the D.C. Stormwater Management Authority constructed a 7,920 foot long, concrete-lined channel for the stream from 13th Street, SE to South Capitol Street. More recently, in 1995, WMATA stabilized and realigned the channel near the Suitland Parkway to allow construction of the piers for the Naylor Road Station.

Meanwhile, the construction of the Oxon Run Sewer Interceptor in the 1930s and the World War II population growth enabled another housing boom in the Oxon Run valley and a road network expansion. Town centers at Silver Hill, Suitland, and Dupont Heights filled the watershed with urban and suburban housing and, to provide transportation to them, South Capitol Street, Branch Avenue, Shadyside Avenue, and Brooks Drive were bridged over the stream between 1938 and 1942. From 1943 to 1944, the military constructed the Suitland Parkway, then known as the Camp Springs Highway, through the stream valley to connect Bolling Air Force Base to Andrews Air Force Base, crossing Oxon Run at Walker Road. Between 1947 and 1951, bridges for the 23rd Parkway and the entrance road to Cedar Hill Cemetery were built across the stream. In 1959 Pennsylvania Avenue was extended to Forestville, MD through the Oxon Run valley and over the stream at Shadyside Avenue and around the same time 4th Street bridged the stream. The last road bridge over the stream, at Southern Avenue, was built in 1980. The last transportation development in the valley was the final section of Metro's Green Line from Congress Heights to Branch Avenue, which WMATA built from 1995 to 2001. It extended Metrorail under Oxon Run and the Parkway through a tunnel and then over the stream twice, once just south of the D.C. boundary and a second time near the intersection of Suitland Parkway and Naylor Road before turning east along the Oxon Run's tributary to Suitland.

In 1971, the land between 13th Street and South Capitol became Oxon Run Park. It was placed under the control of the District government. At the same time, the land between 13th and Southern Avenue remained the Oxon Run Parkway under the management of the National Park Service. In 1975, local officials began planning improvements in the Park but did not complete those plans until 1984 because of funding limitations. The plan called for several miles of jogging and bike trails, picnic areas, ball fields, an amphitheater, basketball and tennis courts, and a nature trail. Work began in 1984 and included five pedestrian bridges over the stream. Between 2016 and 2017, the trail system was expanded and rehabilitated.

== Water quality ==
Oxon Run is in a highly urbanized area, and its water quality has been rated as poor by government agencies. The stream has been polluted by stormwater runoff, dumped trash, sewer leaks, and contamination from an old firing range and an unlined landfill. Much of the stream is in concrete channels or culverts. Virtually all of the streams in the watershed are unstable, with stream bank erosion producing 18,000 tons of sediment per year.

== See also ==
- Watts Branch (Potomac River)
- List of District of Columbia rivers
- List of Maryland rivers
- Oxon Creek
- Oxon Run Parkway
