= William Marye =

American antiquary, genealogist (1886–1979)

William Bose Marye (1886–1979) was an American antiquary, genealogist, historian, writer, and amateur archaeologist, and a prominent authority in Maryland history, genealogy, topography, and Native American archaeology.

== Biography ==
Marye was born on September 3, 1886, at Bellevue Farm near Kingsville, Baltimore County, Maryland, the only son of William Nelson Marye and Mary Bose Marye née Gittings.

He attended Marston's School, receiving a Bachelor of Arts degree from Johns Hopkins University in 1907. He was a member of the Maryland Naval Militia.

Marye became the official genealogist for the Colonial Dames of America, and a member of the Maryland Historical Society, for which he published numerous articles in the Maryland Historical Magazine. He also published articles for Pennsylvania and Delaware archaeological societies.

Marye was a member of the committee chaired by Solon J. Buck that investigated the Horn Papers. He is credited as an early researcher of "The Great Maryland Barrens".

He never married, and died at age 93 in Baltimore on October 23, 1979.

== Legacy ==
The William B. Marye Award has, since 1983, been awarded annually by the Archaeological Society of Maryland to honor individuals who have contributed to Maryland archaeology.
