= Oxon Creek =

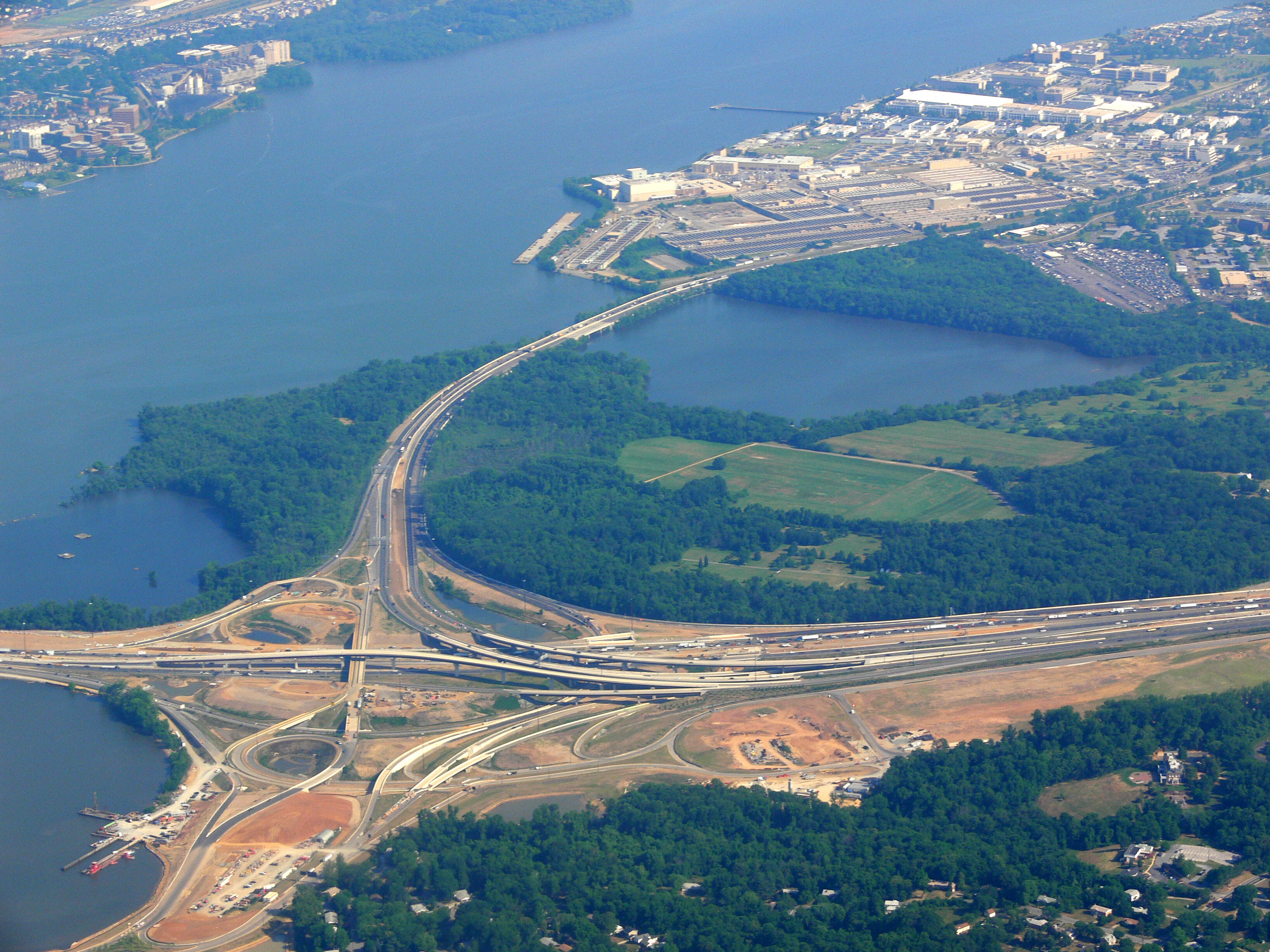
- Anacostia Freeway Crossing Oxon Creek to join the Beltway (2007) - Wilson Bridge is to the left

Location
- Country: United States
- State: Maryland, District of Columbia
- Counties: MD: Prince George's; DC: City of Washington

Physical characteristics
- Source
  - coordinates: 38.8166667°N 77.0063889°W
- Mouth
  - location: Potomac River
  - coordinates: 38°48′26″N 77°1′29″W
  - elevation: −3 feet (−0.91 m)
- Length: 1.5 mi (2.4 km)

Basin features
- River system: Potomac River
- Tributaries
  - left: Barnaby Run (Winkle Doodle Run), Forest Heights Tributary, Oxon Hill Tributary
  - right: Oxon Run

Oxon Creek is a stream on the Potomac River which feeds a cove that straddles the border between Washington, D.C., and Prince George's County, Maryland just north of Interstate 495 (Capital Beltway) at Woodrow Wilson Bridge. Oxon Creek heads at the confluence of Oxon Run and Barnaby Run, sometimes referred to as Winkle Doodle Run. It starts just inside the boundary of D.C. and then runs 1.5 miles (2.4 km) to the south and west into Maryland to empty into the Potomac at Goose Island (a sand bar often under water) across from the city of Alexandria, Virginia. Before reaching the Potomac, the creek widens to form Oxon Cove which is partially in Maryland and partially in Washington, D.C. The creek is almost entirely within Oxon Cove National Park, except for the first few feet in D.C. and a portion of the cove on the southside of the Blue Plains Advanced Wastewater Treatment Plant.

Two bridges cross the creek. The Anacostia Freeway crosses it on a bridge where it becomes a tidal stream and the Oxon Hill Farm Trail crosses it where it is still narrow.

The unusual spelling is either historical or a reference to Oxfordshire, England, though it was usually labelled as Oxen Creek on maps prior to 1898. The distinction between Oxon Creek and Oxon Run is often not recognized and so both are frequently referred to as Oxon Run. USGS first started labeling it as Oxon Creek in 1892.

== Variant names ==
According to the Geographic Names Information System, Oxon Creek has been known by the following names throughout its history:

- Isedores Creeke
- Isidoras Creek
- Oxen Creek
- Saint Isedores Creeke
- Saint John Creeke
- Saint Johns Creeke

== History ==
The area around Oxon Creek was largely undeveloped until the World War II era, when the Town of Forest Heights was built up along the south east side of the creek. Following Hurricane Connie in 1955, the U.S. Army Corps of Engineers began planning a flood control project along Oxon Creek that realigned the channel, dredged the creek to 100 feet wide, and constructed a 3-foot concrete drop structure just upstream from the Forest Heights Tributary. A smaller drop structure was built on the Forest Heights Tributary. Work began on the project in 1961.

The first bridge across the Creek, the Anacostia Freeway bridge, was opened in 1961 and then rebuilt around 2000. The trail bridge was constructed in the 1970s.

Oxon Creek is entirely contained within Oxon Cove Park and Oxon Hill Farm, which is part of the National Park Service. Planning for the park began in 1969.

== Oxon Creek Trails ==
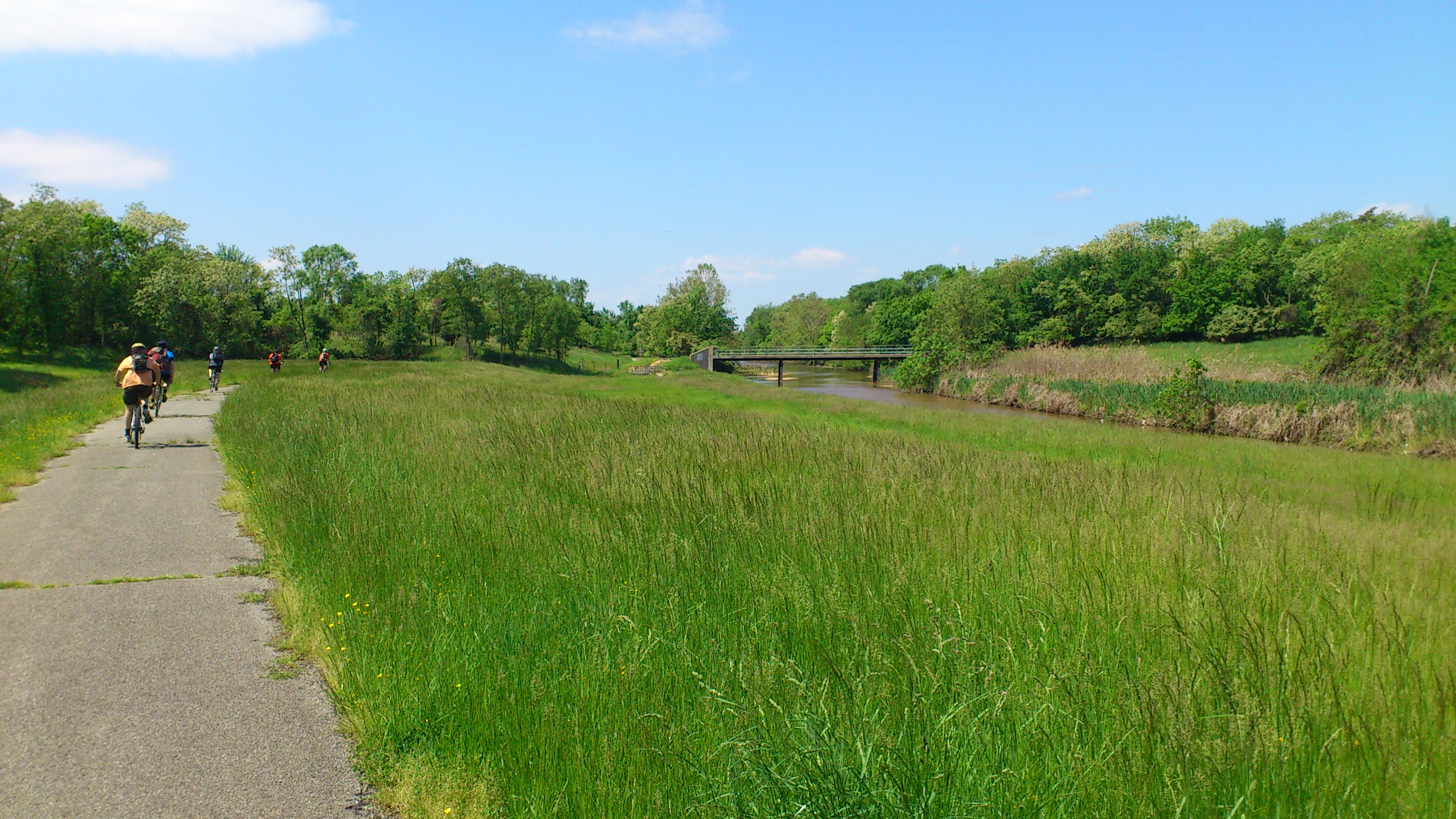
Oxon Creek and the Oxon Creek Trail

A set of trails run parallel to Oxon Creek and cross it on a bridge. The Oxon Creek Trail starts at the intersection of Oxon Run Drive and Audrey Lane in Forest Heights, Maryland. It crosses over the unnamed Forest Heights tributary and then follows the creek for about half a mile till it meets up with the Oxon Hill Hiker-Biker Trail just past another unnamed tributary within Oxon Cove National Park.

The 2 mile long Oxon Hill Hiker-Biker Trail starts at the Oxon Hill Farm Parking lot and then goes down the hill to the southeast corner of Oxon Cove. From there it follows along the south and east side of Oxon Creek to the Oxon Creek Trail. There it crosses Oxon Creek on one of only two bridges over the creek and passes through parkland, into Washington, D.C., and ends at DC Village Lane, SW.

The Oxon Cove Trails trace their origins to the 1970s when bike commuters used access roads and a causeway built for landfill operations. When the landfill closed, cyclists asked for a trail and one was built in 1978. Prior to 2010, the bridge over the Forest Heights tributary was washed out by high water, leaving only a low water crossing. In 2011, the section within the District was rebuilt as part of the project to create a new police evidence warehouse and, in the same year, the bridge connecting the Oxon Creek Trail and the Hiker-Biker path was constructed.

== See also ==
- List of Maryland rivers
- List of rivers of Washington, D.C.
