= John Clagett Proctor =

American local historian, newspaper columnist and printer

John Clagett Proctor (1867-1956) was a local historian, newspaper columnist, and printer in Washington, D.C., best known for a long-running weekly column in the Washington Star newspaper.

Proctor was born November 15, 1867, in a house on New York Avenue NW between 6th and 7th Streets in Washington, D. C. He was the seventh child and second son of Mary Ann (Davison) and John Clagett Proctor, a lawyer and journalist who was then the city editor of the National Republican newspaper.

In 1883, Proctor began printing under Albert J. S. Curet at the United States National Museum. The next year, he received a permanent job at the museum, where he would work until 1906. In the early 1890s, he enrolled in the National University Law School, graduating with a master of laws degree in 1894. He passed the D.C. bar later that year, but never practiced as a lawyer.

Long interested in "history, biography, and genealogy, especially of his native Washington and the neighboring Maryland and Virginia counties," Clagett began speaking at local events on historical topics. In 1902, he began to publish articles and other writings on local history.

In 1928, he inaugurated a weekly column in the Washington Star. In 1949, he published his columns as a book: Proctor's Washington and Environs.

In 1939, the National University Law School gave him an honorary doctorate of laws degree.

Proctor died on April 19, 1956, at his house at 1605 Jonquil Street NW in Washington, D.C. His obituary in the Evening Star pronounced him the "outstanding historian on 19th Century Washington".

In 1964, Milton Rubincam wrote for the Columbia Historical Society:

A dedicated local historian, Proctor contributed extensively to our knowledge of the events that have taken place in the Nation's Capital and its environs. His published writings reflect his interest in every facet of life in this area —social, political, economic, financial, educational, diplomatic, literary, military, even genealogically.
