= Oxon Run Parkway =

- IUCN category V (protected landscape/seascape)
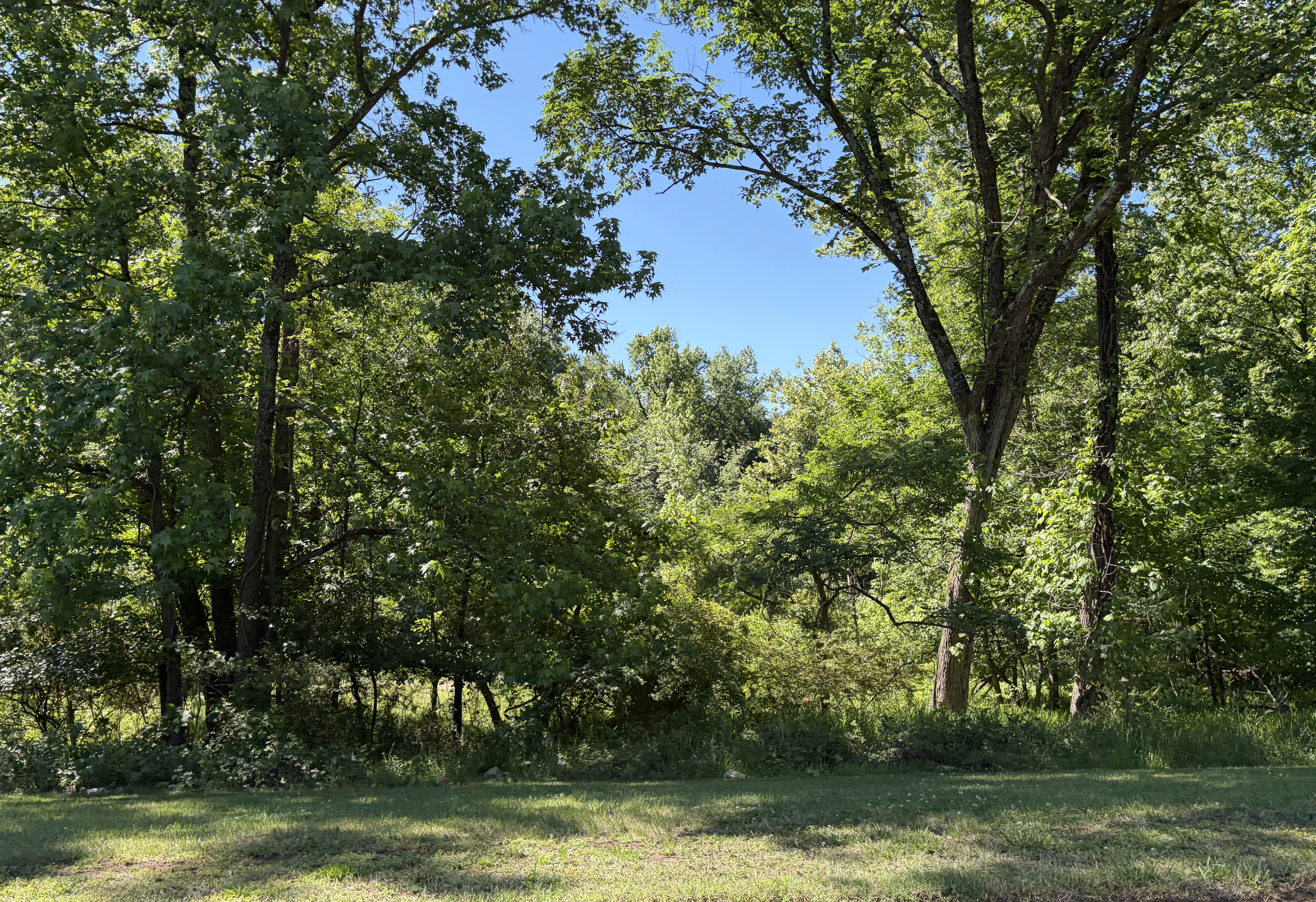
- Oxon Run Parkway viewed from Mississippi Avenue SE

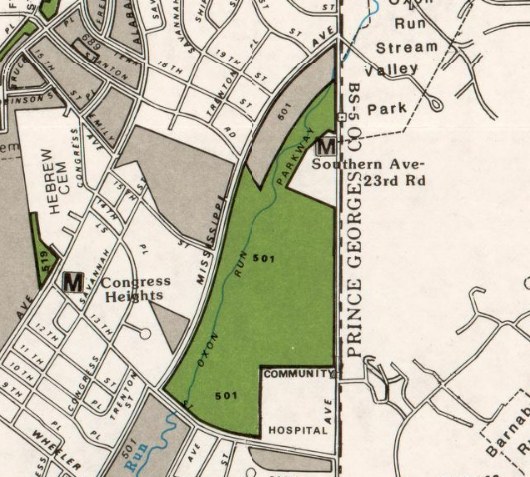
- 1989 Map showing the Oxon Run Parkway
- Location: District of Columbia, United States
- Coordinates: 38°50′17.5″N 76°59′5.5″W
- Area: 59 ha (150 acres)
- Authorized: 1926
- Governing body: National Park Service

The Oxon Run Parkway is a corridor of federal park land in the Washington Highlands neighborhood of Washington, D.C. The Parkway once extended across the District's southern corner in a crescent from Hillcrest Heights to Oxon Hill but most of it became Oxon Run Park in 1971, and now only the portion north of 13th Street still uses the Parkway name. It was originally intended to provide recreation space, but was later enlarged to provide flood relief, space for a major piece of sewer infrastructure and the possibility of a clean drinking water source.

At one time there was to be a road within it, but the road was dropped from the plans. The remaining Parkway is now 146 acres (59 ha). 94 acres (38 ha) of the existing site were originally a portion of the Camp Simms rifle range. What remains of the Parkway sits between Southern Avenue, Mississippi Avenue and 13th Street, SE and is now managed by the National Park Service. It contains wetlands, floodplains, springs, and forests as well as the only remaining McAteen magnolia bogs in the District of Columbia.

== Proposed road ==
Part of the parkway road was built in Hillcrest Heights, Maryland but the name was later changed to Oxon Run Drive. In 1942, a section of Oxon Run Parkway in Dillon Park, Maryland was renamed to 53rd Avenue. It was later, after 1981, renamed Dewitt Avenue. A short road in District Heights, Maryland, off Scott Key Drive is the only road that still uses the Oxon Run Parkway name.

In 1946, the NCPPC voted to change the name of several parkways including Oxon Run Parkway to just "parks" because they did not contain a road through the middle; but the name "Oxon Run Parkway" remained in popular use and outlived the change.

== History ==
The Oxon Run Parkway was created by the National Capital Park and Planning Commission (NCPPC) to provide park space to the people of Washington, to allow for the construction of a sewer main and to prevent construction in the floodplain. In 1924, Congress created the NCPPC to create a park and playground system for the National Capital and by 1926, they had begun making plans for a "parkway" or park system that would include land along the Anacostia, at Fort Dupont, along Foundry Branch and along Oxon Run. By 1930, NCPPC had begun purchasing narrow strips of land along the shores of the stream for the park. This coincided with a report from NCPPC identifying Oxon Run as a possible water source for Maryland. The report stated that a sewer would be needed through the valley to protect the waters of Oxon Run from pollution. After a 1937 flood, NCPPC decided to purchase 144 additional acres of land in the valley from the District line to the Camp Simms rifle range north of 14th. The land would widen the Parkway above the high water mark, thus preventing the construction of homes that might be prone to flooding. It also allowed for the construction of the sewer project, the Oxon Run interceptor, that was completed in 1939. Expansion continued as 40 acres (16 ha) were purchased in 1939 and another 64 in 1940, bringing the total to 137. Small additional purchases, of more than 11 acres (4.5 ha), were made later in 1940 and in 1941, and then in 1942 a further 20 acres (8.1 ha) were acquired. Another 2.5 acres (1.0 ha) were purchased in 1944 as the 8-year long Oxon Run Parkway and flood control project wrapped up its work. At this point the Parkway extended across the entire District, with the exception of the portion within Camp Simms.

In 1946, President Truman signed an amendment to the Capper-Crampton Act which, among other things, called for the Parkway to be extended into Maryland from the District Line to Marlboro Pike (then known as Marlboro Road). This extension, however, was carried out by the Maryland-National Capital Park and Planning Commission and was never part of the Parkway, nor did it ever extend past the Suitland Parkway.

In 1951, NCPPC began work on transferring some of the Camp Simms Firing Range, an irregularly shaped plot located between Alabama Avenue, Southern Avenue, 13th and Valley Terrace to the National Park Service. The portion they sought for the park was between Mississippi Ave and Valley Avenue, as the Parkway already included the land on both sides of the rifle range. The range had been in use since 1904, but by 1953 it no longer was and the District was making plans to extend a highway through the area, with one lane on each side of the run. In 1958, the Defense Department transferred the land to the General Services Administration and later 94 acres (38 ha) of the site was added to the parkway. In July 1994, while digging wells in preparation for the Green Line tunnel, Metro discovered 6 Stokes mortar rounds, prompting the U.S. Army Corps of Engineers (COE) to begin a clean-up of the site. By the end of 1995 they had found 30 pieces of live ammunition, and by the end of 1997 a total of 74 pieces. The clean-up took two years and delayed construction of the Green Line tunnel beneath the Parkway. Following the clean-up, the National Park Service and the USDA National Resource Conservation Service (NRCS) performed an ecological restoration of Oxon Run within the Parkway, stabilizing the soil with jute mating and planting new plants. They also restored the old rifle range, which contained lead-contaminated soils and old shell casings left from years of target practice, by covering it with new top soil. Work was completed in January 2000.

NCPPC began divesting itself of the land it had acquired as early as 1942 when it turned over the Oxon Run Recreation Center, between Mississippi and Valley Avenue & 4th and 6th Streets, to the then newly formed District Recreation Board. In 1971, NCPC transferred 300 acres (120 ha) of federal parkland from the National Park Service to the District government, part of a larger 700-acre (280 ha) transfer, including Watts Branch, Pope Branch and most of the Oxon Run Parkway. The transferred land along Oxon Run became Oxon Run Park. Other plots were handed over for schools and for an arts recreation center.
