= Fort Greble =

Historic fort in Washington, D.C.

- Part of the Civil War defenses of Washington, D.C.
- Congress Heights, District of Columbia

Site information
- Type: Earthwork fort

Location
- Coordinates: 38°49′38″N 77°00′53″W

Site history
- Built: Fall, 1861
- Built by: U.S. Army Corps of Engineers
- In use: 1861–1869
- Materials: Earth, timber
- Demolished: 1869
- Battles/wars: American Civil War

Garrison information
- Garrison: One company, Seventh Unattached Heavy Artillery regiment, Massachusetts Volunteers (125 men)

Fort Greble was an American Civil War-era Union fortification constructed as part of the defenses of Washington, D.C. during that war. Named for First Lieutenant John Trout Greble, the first West Point graduate killed in the U.S. Civil War, it protected the junction of the Anacostia and Potomac rivers, and from its position on a bluff in the Congress Heights, precluded any bombardment of the Washington Navy Yard and southeastern portions of the city. It was supported by Fort Carroll to the northeast and Fort Foote to the south. It never fired a shot during the war, and after a brief stint as a U.S. Army Signal Corps training facility, was abandoned and the land returned to its natural state. As of July 2007, the site of the fort is a community park.

== Planning and construction ==
Prior to the outbreak of war, Congress Heights (so called because the Capitol building in downtown Washington could be seen from the tops of the hills) were owned by the Berry family, who also owned much of the Anacostia River bottomland to the west of the Heights. In the days following the First Battle of Bull Run, panicked efforts by the Union were made to defend Washington from what was perceived as an imminent Confederate attack. These makeshift entrenchments were largely confined to the direct approaches to Washington and the bridges that spanned the Potomac.

Multiple forts were constructed in the Arlington region to the southwest of Washington on land rented or leased from the pre-war owners. Despite these efforts, following General George B. McClellan assuming command of the Military Division of the Potomac on July 26, 1861, he found that

not a single defensive work had been commenced on the Maryland side [of the Potomac]. There was nothing to prevent the enemy shelling the city from heights within easy range, which could be occupied by a hostile column almost without resistance.

In the wake of his declaration, fort construction was accelerated and expanded, with new strong points and artillery positions springing up around the entire 37-mile (60-km) perimeter of the District of Columbia. In order to prevent an attack on the undefended Maryland side of the Potomac, Brigadier General John G. Barnard, chief engineer of the Department of Washington, directed that several forts be constructed on the Congress Heights in order to protect the Navy Yard and Washington Arsenal from bombardment. At the crucial western end of the Heights would be the then-unnamed Fort Greble.

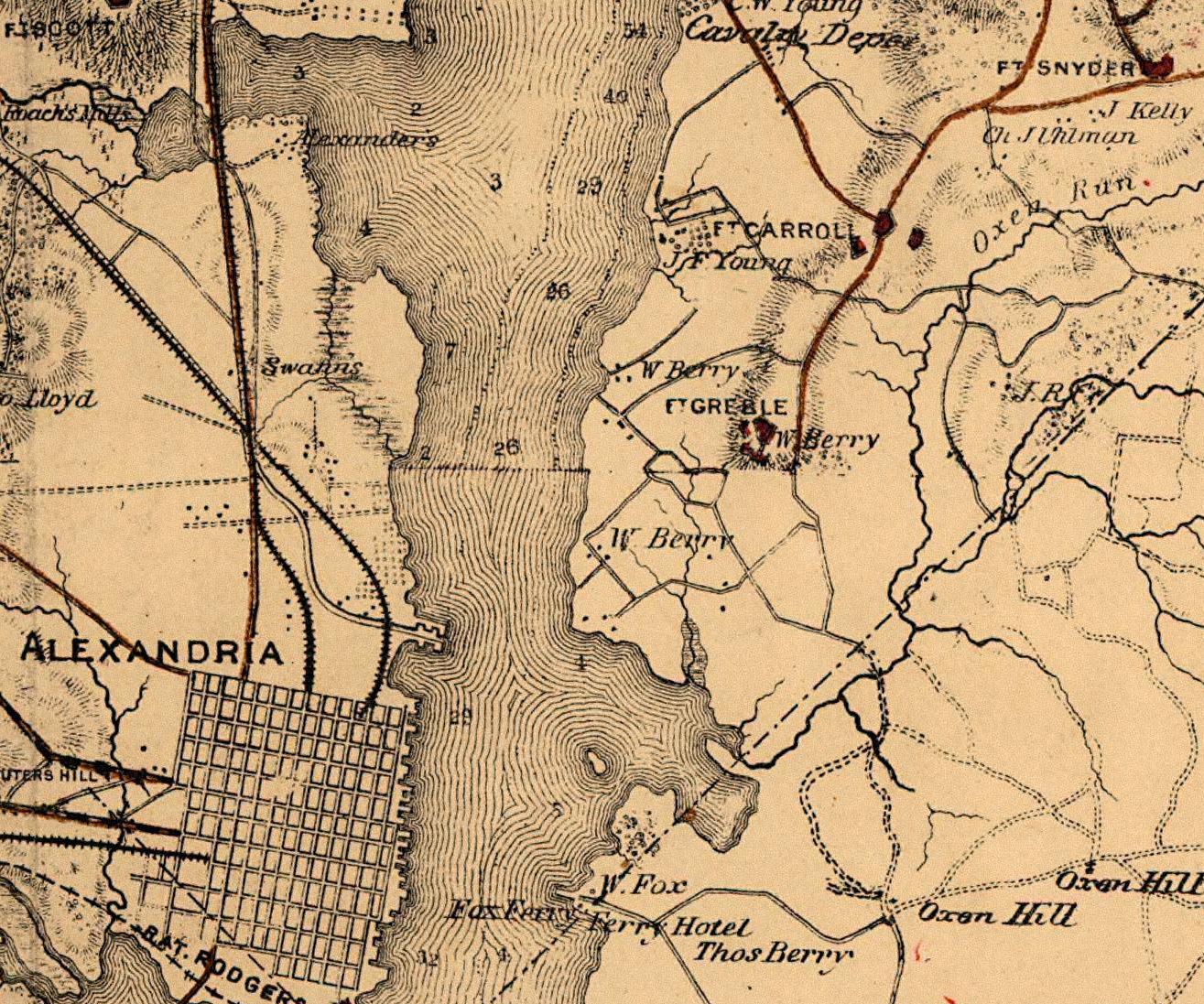
This map shows the location of Fort Greble near the conjunction of the Anacostia and Potomac Rivers as well as its proximity to the city of Alexandria, Virginia. To the northeast are Forts Carroll and Snyder.

Planning and surveying for the proposed line of forts progressed quickly, and by the end of September 1861, work had begun on what was to become Fort Greble. Under the direction of U.S. Army engineers, the work progressed quickly, and the fort, which was constructed as several closely supporting redoubts, was completed before Christmas. General Barnard, in a report to General Totten, chief engineer of the U.S. Army was able to report "Forts Greble and Stanton are completed and armed;" on December 10, 1861. The fort was named for Lt. John Trout Greble, killed at the Battle of Big Bethel. The fort had a perimeter of 327 yards and places for 17 guns.

A fall 1862 review of Washington's fortifications described Fort Greble as a "large and powerful work, well provided with magazines and bomb-proofs." Despite that praise, the report also recommended new gun platforms and protection for gun crews.

The rapid completion of the fort did have some drawbacks, however. The fort lacked some of the refinements that would be present at later forts like Fort Foote. In 1864, civil engineer William C. Gunnell requested the removal of the wooden buildings that served as company quarters at Fort Greble so that the ammunition for the fort could be safely placed in magazines to be built in place of the shanties. There simply had not been time in 1861 to construct proper earthen magazines. This sort of constant renovation and improvement would continue throughout the war as forts were adapted to new purposes and new garrisons.

== Wartime use ==
From the time of its construction, Fort Greble was never intended to serve as part of a continuous line of defenses stretching from the Potomac to Fort Lincoln at the extreme eastern end of the District of Columbia. Rather, the fort and its sister emplacements on the east bank of the Potomac were intended to deny the Confederacy the possibility of infiltrating guns across the Potomac in order to bombard the Washington Navy Yard. This fact is best illustrated by the 1862 report of the Commission on the Defenses of Washington, which was created by Secretary of War Edwin M. Stanton to provide oversight to the Army Engineers constructing the defenses. Their report, released in December 1862, illustrated the isolated nature of the Eastern Branch defenses:

In relation to this group of works, the Commission express the opinion that an enemy will not attempt to enter Washington from this direction, and that we cannot (as a general rule) expect to be able to meet him with a line of troops. What is to be prevented is the seizure of these heights for the purpose of establishing batteries to destroy the navy-yard and arsenal. For this purpose the works should be self-sustaining, or relying only upon such aid as a small movable body of troops can furnish, and upon succor, which may be thrown over the Branch after an attack is developed.

Over the course of the war, these words would prove prophetic. No Confederate forces would bring Fort Greble under fire during its entire four-year active military career, and its garrison units, rotated regularly, served quietly behind its earthen walls.

=== Life at the fort ===
Daily life at Fort Greble was similar to that experienced by soldiers at other forts in the Washington defenses. A soldier's normal day began with reveille before sunrise and was immediately followed by morning muster, at which the soldiers of the garrison were counted and reported for sick call. Following muster, the day was filled with work on improving the fort's defenses and drill of various types, usually consisting of gunnery practice, but also including infantry and parade drill. This schedule usually continued, broken by meal and rest breaks, until taps was called at 8:00 or 9:00 p.m. Sunday was a break in the routine as the muster was immediately followed by a weekly inspection and church call. Sunday afternoons were a soldier's free time, and this was usually filled by writing letters home, bathing, or simply catching up on extra sleep.

For much of the year, the garrison would be plagued by mosquitoes and the heat and humidity common to the Washington area during the summer. Though Fort Greble was built on a hill, the area immediately surrounding the fort consisted of swampy bottomland drained by the Anacostia and Potomac rivers, a breeding ground for malaria. Communication with the outside world was provided by the military road that served the Eastern Branch line of forts, and supply wagons would usually arrive on a weekly schedule. Trips to Washington or Uniontown from the fort were uncommon, and by virtue of its location at the extreme end of the Eastern Branch defenses, Fort Greble was isolated even from its neighboring forts.

Until 1864, communications between Fort Greble and its neighbors had to be routed through departmental headquarters in Washington. After a test of the system completely failed, efforts were made to establish signaling points between the forts, and the forts themselves were connected to Washington via telegraph wire. Signal detachments were present at Fort Stanton, near Uniontown, and sometimes visited Fort Greble as part of training efforts.

=== The garrison ===
In accordance to a plan laid out in an October 1861 report by General Barnard, "rear line" forts were to receive one man per yard of fort perimeter when fully garrisoned. Front-line forts were to receive two men per yard, when needed. However, most forts were not kept fully garrisoned at all times. Due to its location north of the Potomac River, Fort Greble was considered a rear-line fort. To man Fort Greble's 327 yards (299 m) of perimeter, Barnard designated a force of 165 men. If the fort needed to be fully garrisoned due to an impending attack, the difference in the actual garrison and the plan would be made good from Washington's reserve force. As General Barnard would say in a December 24, 1862 report, "It is seldom necessary to keep these infantry supports attached to the works."

However, this plan only applied to men manning the walls of the fort, not the artillerymen who would be serving the fort's guns. To man the guns of Fort Greble and those of Washington's other forts, Barnard designated three crews for each gun. These crews would be permanently located at the fort, unlike the men assigned to the walls of the fort. To fire Fort Greble's planned complement of 15 guns, Barnard assigned 255 artillerymen. This plan was affected by the needs of the war. As the fighting dragged on and casualties mounted, the various commanders of the Army of the Potomac repeatedly raided the Washington garrison for trained artillerymen and infantry replacements. By 1864, Washington had been stripped to a total less than half that of Barnard's 1861 recommendation.

According to a May 1864 report by General Albion P. Howe, Inspector of Artillery, the garrison of Fort Greble consisted of a single company of the Seventh Unattached Heavy Artillery, Massachusetts Volunteers, commanded by Captain George S. Worcester. 125 men of various ranks served six 12-pounder field howitzers, six 32-pounder barbette guns, one 8-inch (200 mm) siege howitzer, one Coehorn mortar, one 10-inch (250 mm) mortar, and one 30-pounder Parrott rifle. The same report lists the garrison as "drilled some at artillery and infantry," putting it a step ahead of the garrisons of neighboring forts Wagner and Ricketts, which were judged as "Drilled but little at artillery and infantry; not efficient."

== Post-war use ==
After the surrender of General Robert E. Lee's Army of Northern Virginia on April 9, 1865, the primary reason for manned defenses protecting Washington ceased to exist. Initial recommendations by Col. Alexander, chief engineer of the Washington defenses, were to divide the defenses into three classes: those that should be kept active (first-class), those that should be mothballed and kept in a reserve state (second-class), and those that should be abandoned entirely (third-class). Fort Greble fell into the second-class category.

To this end, the 22nd Army Corps issued General Order 89, which stated (in part) that the guns and ammunition removed from the dismantled forts should be kept in storage. Fort Greble was chosen as one of the storage locations. As a second-class fort, Fort Greble continued to receive regular maintenance and upkeep. By the end of August 1865, however, with funds running low, and no further appropriations likely, this work began to slack off. As the money ran out, more and more forts were designated as second- or third-class locations, and were dismantled and the land returned to its original owners.

In August 1867, the commander of the Department of Washington wrote to the Chief of Ordnance, asking how much longer he needed Fort Greble as an ordnance depot for materiel removed from dismantled forts. When it could do so, the Ordnance Department removed its property to the Washington Arsenal, now Fort McNair, or transferred it to a still-garrisoned fort, though with post-war budget cuts, these were becoming few and far between.

The infant Army Signal Corps, which had played a valuable part in the Civil War, had a need for a post-war training ground. In 1866, the Army allowed the Chief Signal Officer of the Army, General Albert J. Myer, to use Fort Greble for this purpose. Then, in 1868, Myer requested and received control over Fort Greble as a signal communications school for instruction in electric telegraphy and visual signaling. In January 1869, however, Myer moved the school from Fort Greble and soon established it at Fort Whipple, Virginia.

Following that move, the fort was sold back into private ownership, where the land was later purchased for use as a park. Throughout the 20th century, various attempts were made to include Fort Greble as the terminus of a "ring" of parks surrounding the city of Washington. The parks would be connected by a 23.5-mile (37.8-km) Fort Circle Drive, but these plans never made it off the drawing board, due to budget concerns and the political issues involved. Though many of the forts—including Fort Greble—did become parks, they were not connected in a grand plan surrounding Washington. Today, the site of Fort Greble is home to Fort Greble Recreation Center, a community center for local youths and neighborhood events. In 2006, a lighted baseball field was built at the site as part of a Washington-wide renovation of city parks.
