= Pennsylvania Avenue Bridge (1890) =

Bridge in United States of America

Coordinates: 38°52′37″N 76°58′41″W

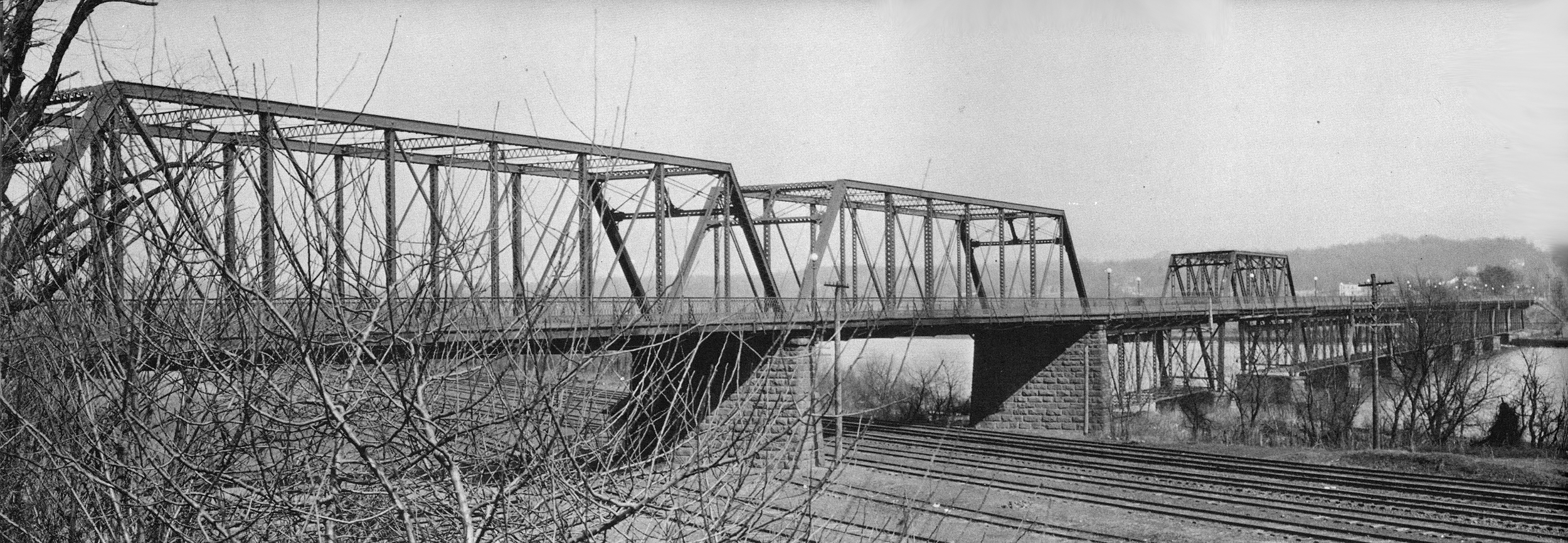
The 1890 bridge, photographed about 1938 shortly before it was demolished.

The Pennsylvania Avenue Bridge was a crossing of the Anacostia River in Washington, DC at the site of the present John Philip Sousa Bridge. It was constructed in 1890 and demolished around 1939.

== Description ==
The 1890 Pennsylvania Avenue Bridge was slightly upstream from the location of an earlier 1815 bridge. It had two northwestern abutments made of stone, both of which rose 38 feet (12 m) above the low-water mark. The single southwestern abutment was made of compacted earth covered with stone slabs. There were nine piers in the river itself, each made of brownstone masonry and rising 10 feet (3.0 m) above the low-water mark. Because bedrock could not be located in the riverbed, the piers rested on pilings and grillage. (Note: Grillage is a framework of heavy wood or metal beams designed to act as a kind of underground floating platform in soft, wet, or unstable ground.) The substructure of the bridge consisted of iron Pegram trusses. On the northwestern side of the bridge, the trusses from the shore to the first and second abutments were above the bridge, so as not to interfere with the passage of the B&PR trains below the bridge. The other trusses were all slung below the bridge. Each of the 10 trusses over the piers was 112 feet (34 m) long and painted dark red. They had a clearance of just 2 to 3 feet (0.61 to 0.91 m) over the high-water mark. The roadway was just 24 feet (7.3 m) wide, and consisted of oak planks over iron beams. Unlike the previous bridges, there was no draw span.

A watchman's hut was constructed near the northwestern terminus. Because of the concern that pedestrians might interfere with vehicular traffic, causing carriages to drive off the bridge and land on the railway tracks below, a 5-foot (1.5 m) wooden fence was erected on the first two city-side spans to separate the carriageway and pedestrian walkway. For the rest of the bridge, a timber curb separated the two paths. The edges of the bridge had a 5-foot (1.5 m) ornamental iron fence to keep people or carriages from falling into the river. Coal gas-lit lampposts providing lighting along the bridge. Fences lined the side of the roadway on the southwestern abutment to prevent carriages from driving off the embankment.

The bridge was served on its city-side by Pennsylvania Avenue. Although the avenue was paved only to within 0.25 miles (0.40 km) of the bridge, cement sidewalks on both sides of the avenue provided improved pedestrian access to the bridge. Kentucky Avenue SE, which met Pennsylvania Avenue SE just before the bridge, was graded prior to the bridge's dedication. East of the river, the state of Maryland constructed a new road along the old Upper Marlboro Turnpike to link to Pennsylvania Avenue SE. To many observers, however, the bridge seemed isolated. There were no homes close to either end of the structure, and the area on east side was mostly goat pasture, farms, and clay bottom land. The nearest streetcar line was more than 0.5 miles (0.80 km) away, although area streetcar companies were hoping to build a rail line over the new Pennsylvania Avenue Bridge to serve the area.

== History ==
No bridge connected the east and west ends of Pennsylvania Avenue SE over the Anacostia River between 1845 and 1890. Benning Bridge, erected upstream in 1805, and the 11th Street Bridges, built downstream in 1820, also carried vehicular and foot traffic over the Ancostia. But the Uniontown "suburb" was platted in the Anacostia area in 1854, and development slowly began to turn the agricultural land into businesses and residences. The destruction of the Eastern Branch Bridge in 1846, however, significantly slowed growth in the area for five decades.

The first push for a new bridge connecting the two sides of Pennsylvania Avenue occurred in 1870. The effort was led by John S. Gallaher, an auditor for the Commissioner of Pensions in the United States Department of the Interior. He had the support of Lieutenant R.M. Hall, assistant quartermaster in the U.S. Army, and Army Colonel Henry Naylor. Hall's idea was for a large and beautiful bridge, one which would also carry large pipes of fresh water to the eastern part of the city. The area of the city east of the Anacostia suffered extensively from lack of fresh water, and Hall called for extending the Washington Aqueduct east of the river. A large reservoir would be constructed atop the Washington Heights (near what is now the intersection of Good Hope Road SE and Alabama Avenue SE) to receive this water, and the flow of gravity would inexpensively deliver it to homes throughout the area. But Hall's idea was opposed by the citizens of Uniontown, who feared the loss of retail and "carriage trade" businesses. Hall abandoned the proposal, and moved away in 1872.

=== Formation of the East Washington Citizen's Association ===
About 1871, a real estate development known as "East Washington Heights" began. (Note: East Washington Heights was bounded by Massachusetts Avenue SE, Southern Avenue, Naylor Road SE, and Minnesota Avenue SE. A trapezoid with its base along Southern Avenue, it was almost bisected northwest-to-southeast by Pennsylvania Avenue SE.) Intended to be a "suburb" of "the city" catering to wealthy individuals, it never took off. Nevertheless, citizens in the areas that would later become Dupont Park, Fairfax Village, Fort Davis, Hillcrest, Penn Branch, and Randle Highlands wanted a bridge to reconnect "their" Pennsylvania Avenue (which ran through the center of their neighborhoods) with the Pennsylvania Avenue "in the city".

Initially, the citizens of "East Washington" were primarily interested in issues like more clean water, better roads, and improved sewers. On January 31, 1879, they formed the East Washington Citizen's Association (EWCA) to lobby for action. But building a new bridge over the Anacostia River only slowly became an issue for them, and it was not until 1875 that the EWCA began agitating for one. A new bridge, the EWCA pointed out, would save residents of East Washington 4 to 5 miles (6.4 to 8.0 km) in travel every time they visited the city center on the other side of the river.

=== Legislative efforts to authorize a bridge ===
On February 19, 1886, the EWCA formed a committee to lobby the Commissioners of the District of Columbia (the city government) and Congress on the issue. Later that year, Representative Barnes Compton (D-Maryland) introduced legislation in Congress to build a $60,000 bridge of wood on wooden piers. The bill was co-sponsored in the House of Representatives by Representative Jonathan H. Rowell (R-Illinois), and received significant political support from key representatives such as William W. Morrow (R-California), Philip S. Post (R-Illinois), Archibald M. Bliss (D-New York), and Louis E. McComas (R-Maryland). (Note: The Washington Post reported that a "Representative Grant" and "Representative Tompkins" also supported the bill, but no one with those names served in the House at the time. The newspaper also said "Representative Henderson" supported the bill, but it is unclear if this was Representative Thomas J. Henderson (R-Illinois) or Representative David B. Henderson (R-Iowa).) Companion legislation was introduced in the Senate by Senator John James Ingalls (R-Kansas) and Senator Joseph C.S. Blackburn, and strongly supported by influential Senators Preston B. Plumb (R-Kansas) and Isham G. Harris (D-Tennessee). But the Compton bill was strongly opposed by the D.C. Commissioners. The legislation required that the city pay half the cost of the structure, and Commissioner Samuel E. Wheatley led the city government in adamantly refusing to support the bill. Some time prior to May 27, 1886, (Note: Mahan was assistant engineer to the City Commissioners, and departed that post on May 27, 1886.) Captain F.A. Mahan, U.S. Army Corps of Engineers assistant to the Commissioners, drew up new plans for the bridge.

The unanimity of the D.C. Commissioners was broken on April 1, 1886, when Colonel William Ludlow replaced Major Garrett J. Lydecker in city government. A group of EWCA members now began personally lobbying Congress for the bridge. This group consisted of George Francis Dawson, newspaperman; A.F. Sperry, as former newspaperman and now a United States Department of War clerk; M.I. Weller, owner of Weller & Repetti realtors; J.W. Babson, editor of the gazette of the U.S. Patent Office; and Duncan Thompson, resident of the area. The EWCA lobbyists met personally with the D.C. Commissioners on December 5, 1886, to urge their support for the project. Most of the congressional lobbying was done by Weller, who personally testified before the House Committee on the District of Columbia and the Senate Committee on the District of Columbia. Samuel Taylor Suit, a state senator in the Maryland legislature, won passage of a resolution by that state supporting the bridge. These efforts proved highly successful. Senator Blackburn and Representative Rowell won a $40,000 increase in the amount appropriated for the bridge, and inserted language into the bill requiring that it be constructed of iron and be set on stone piers. This legislation passed both chambers of Congress unanimously on February 23, 1887.

=== Construction and dedication of the bridge ===
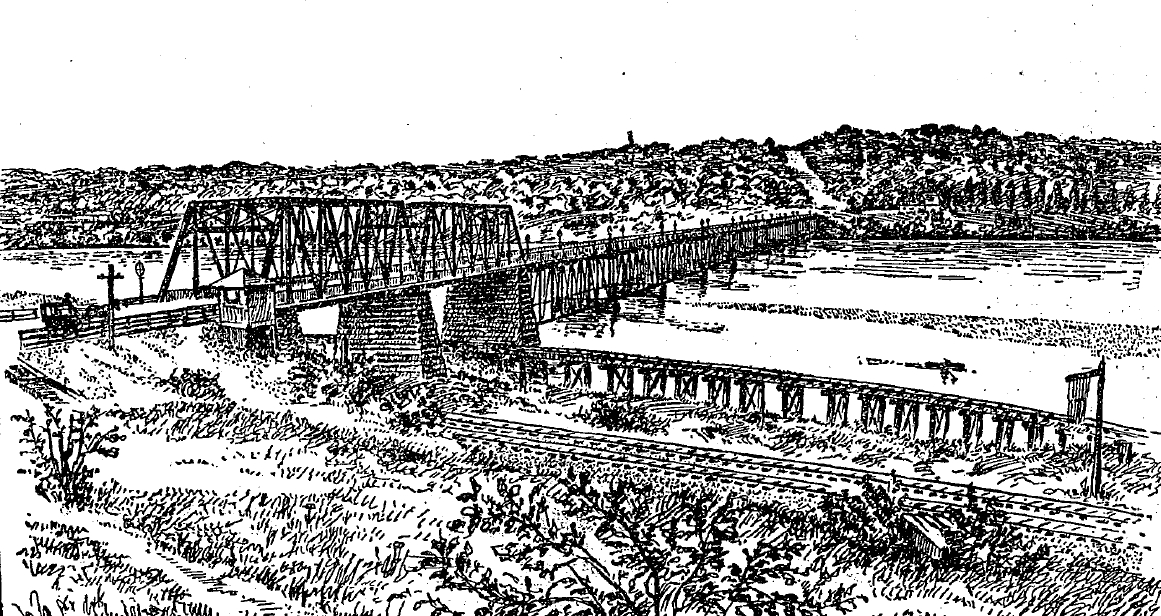
Drawing of the 1890 bridge which appeared in The Washington Post upon the bridge's dedication.

Construction of the new bridge began in November 1887. Complications arose when the Baltimore and Potomac Railroad (B&PR), whose tracks ran along the north/eastern shore of the Anacostia River, sued the federal government. The B&PR argued that the bridge abutment encroached on its right-of-way, and that the bridge was too low over its tracks. The case dragged through the courts for a year, until finally a court ruling resolved the issue: The railroad agreed to move its tracks closer to the riverbank, and the federal government paid for the move. However, this required that a second overland span be created on the northwestern side of the bridge at an additional cost. Colonel Peter Conover Hains of the Army Corps of Engineers asked for an additional sum of $50,000 in 1888. Legislation sponsored by Representative Rowell increased this amount to $60,000, and the legislation passed both houses of Congress unanimously on May 14, 1888. But yet more construction delays occurred. Due to the heavily silted bottom of the river, the Army Corps of Engineers could not find solid ground on which to build the bridge's piers and abutments. A cofferdam was constructed and extensive excavation and investigation of the riverbed occurred before the second abutment on the northwestern side could be sited. The riverbottom also played havoc with siting and sinking of the piers for the bridge. A major flood in 1888 damaged some of the work, and caused further delays. On May 21, 1889, President Benjamin Harrison appointed John Watkinson Douglass and Lemon Galpin Hine to the D.C. Commission to replace Wheatley and William Benning Webb, whose terms had expired. The new commissioners and their new assistant engineer, Captain Thomas W. Symons, were highly enthusiastic about the new bridge.

The new Pennsylvania Avenue Bridge, as it became known, was complete in June 1890. The EWCA decided, however, to delay the bridge's formal dedication and opening until August 25, which was the anniversary of the 1805 bridge's destruction in the War of 1812. The new bridge's dedication was a major event in the history of Washington, D.C. Some 8,000 to 10,000 people attended the event, which included a half-hour artillery salute from the U.S. Army's Light Battery A, a parade from Capitol Hill to the bridge's northwestern terminus, a regatta, and fireworks. The United States Marine Band, conducted by John Philip Sousa, provided music throughout the afternoon and evening. The EWCA also hosted a barbecue, in which three ox were roasted and 4,000 loaves of bread used to feed the crowd roast ox sandwiches.

The total cost of the bridge was $170,000.

=== Economic effects of the 1890 bridge ===
Construction of the 1890 bridge led to extensive new development east of the river. As the bridge was being built in 1889, a consortium known as the Bliss-Havemeyer Syndicate (which included Representative Archibald Bliss, New York state bed manufacturer Erwin C. Carpenter, Representative Thomas J. Clunie, Senator and railroad attorney Chauncey Depew, Senator George Hearst, and sugar refining magnate John W. Havemeyer) purchased 800 acres (3,200,000 m^{2}) of land in the former East Washington Heights development. They built a number of roads in the area, and landscaped the plots along Pennsylvania Avenue SE, Alabama Avenue SE, and Branch Avenue SE with gardens, orchards, pavilions, and shade trees. Bliss constructed the Overlook Inn at 31st Street SE and Pennsylvania Avenue SE, a hotel and supper club that became very popular with city residents. On June 18, 1898, Congress chartered the East Washington Heights Traction Company to provide streetcar service in the new development. The company was authorized to build a new railroad bridge over the Anacostia River parallel to the Pennsylvania Avenue Bridge. Congress required is streetcars to run from Barney Circle across the bridge to Pennsylvania Avenue SE, down Pennsylvania Avenue SE to the District border with Maryland. A branch line would travel south from Pennsylvania Avenue SE along Branch Avenue, and then southwest at Bowen Road (now Alabama Avenue SE) to the intersection with Harrison Street (now Good Hope Road SE), where a neighborhood called "Good Hope" was growing. Another branch line left Pennsylvania Avenue SE at Minnesota Avenue SE, and traveled along Minnesota Avenue to Harrison Street. A third branch line left Pennsylvania Avenue SE at 28th Street SE, traveled north to Anacostia Road SE, and the followed Anacostia Road SE to the neighborhood of East Washington Park (now the neighborhoods of Greenway and Fort Dupont). The firm incorporated on August 13, 1898.

The Bliss-Havemeyer Syndicate collapsed, however, when Havemeyer and Hearst died, and Bliss became seriously ill. The Overlook Inn lost its popular appeal, and only a few homes were built.

However, in 1903, Colonel Arthur E. Randle (Note: Randle, a graduate of the University of Pennsylvania, received the commission of colonel in the Mississippi State Militia from Andrew H. Longino, Governor of the state of Mississippi, in 1902.) formed the United States Realty Company, bought out the Bliss-Havemeyer Syndicate properties and East Washington Heights Traction Company, and founded the settlement of Randle Highlands. Randle, who only arrived in Washington in 1885, founded the development of Congress Heights in 1890. The development was wildly successful, and he invested heavily in the Belt Railway, a local streetcar company. In 1895, the Capital Railway Company extended its streetcar lines over the 11th Street Bridges and down Nicholls Avenue to Congress Heights. (Note: The Capitol, North O Street, and South Washington Railway Company was chartered by Congress on March 3, 1875. By act of Congress enacted on February 18, 1893, it changed its name to the Belt Railway. The Belt Railway was purchased on June 24, 1898, by the Anacostia and Potomac River Railway Company, which itself had been founded on May 19, 1872, but not chartered by Congress until February 18, 1875. Randle founded the Capital Railway Company on March 2, 1895, to own and construct the extension to Congress Heights, and made it a division of the Anacostia and Potomac River Railway in 1899. The Washington Railway and Electric Company purchased a controlling share in the Anacostia and Potomac River Railway on August 31, 1912.) Randle sold his interest in the Capital Railway in 1899, and used this fortune to buy out the Bliss-Havemeyer Syndicate.

In 1902, Randle won approval from Congress to lay streetcar tracks across the Pennsylvania Avenue Bridge. By 1905, he had extended his line 0.75 miles (1.21 km) down Pennsylvania Avenue SE into the new Randle Highlands.

The streetcar line over the bridge spurred extensive new development east of the river. Randle began selling lots in Randle Highlands at a brisk pace in 1903. He made so much money that by 1905 he formed the development of "North Randle Highlands" (now the neighborhoods of Dupont Park, Penn Branch, and the lower portion of Greenway), which extended to Massachusetts Avenue SE. Lots in North Randle Highlands sold even more swiftly than in Randle Highlands. In October 1906, The Washington Post called Randle's developments "among the largest real estate enterprises ever successfully carried through in the District."
