= Neighborhoods in Washington, D.C. =

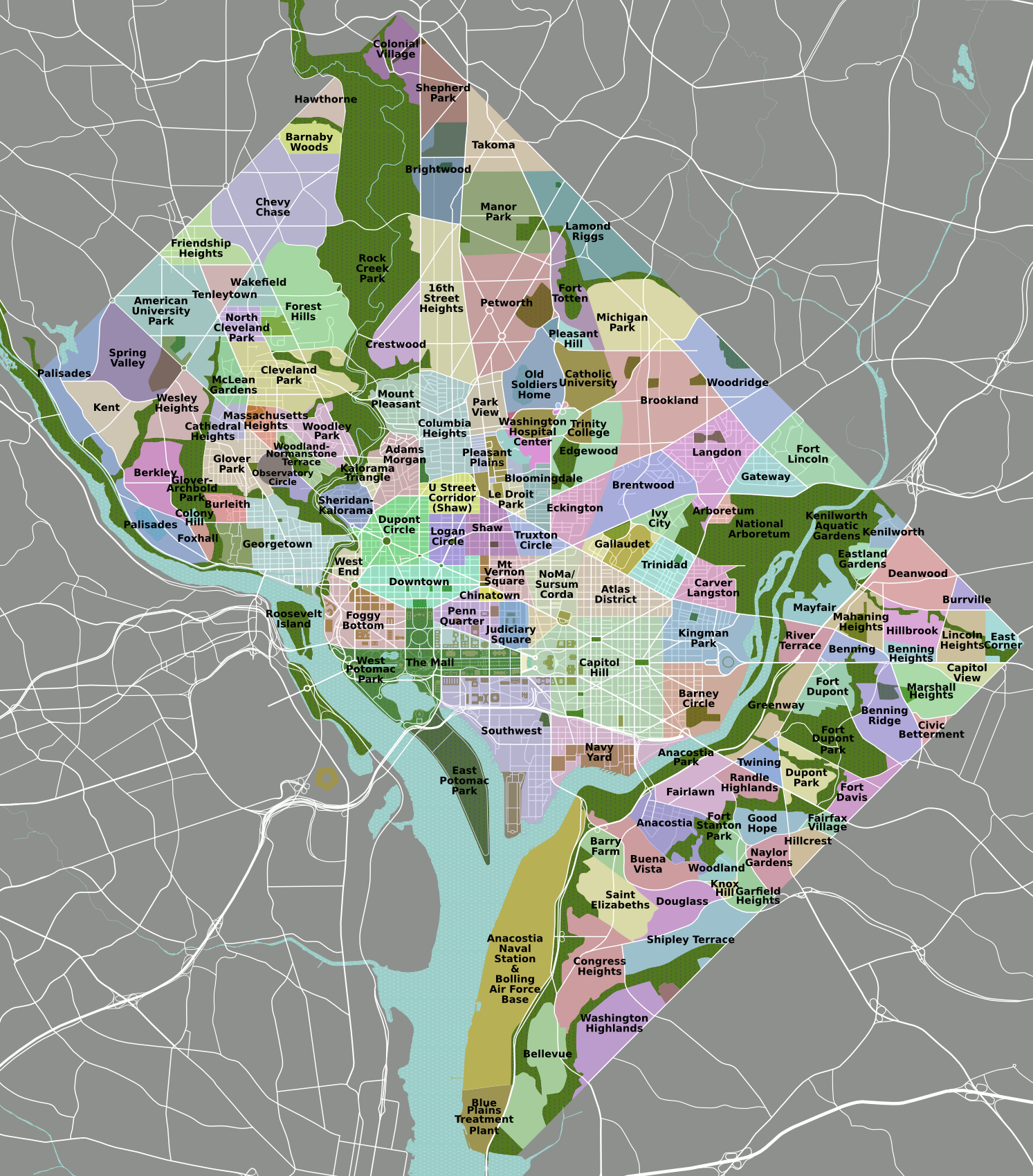
Neighborhoods in Washington, D.C.

Wards in Washington, D.C.

Neighborhoods in Washington, D.C., the capital city of the United States, are distinguished by their history, culture, architecture, demographics, and geography. The names of the 131 neighborhoods are unofficially defined by the D.C. Office of Planning. Though the neighborhoods can be defined by the boundaries of wards, historic districts, Advisory Neighborhood Commissions, civic associations, and business improvement districts (BIDs), these boundaries will overlap. The eight wards each elect a member to the Council of the District of Columbia and are redistricted every ten years.

As the nation's capital, Washington, D.C.'s local neighborhood history and culture is often presented as distinct from that of the national government.

== List of neighborhoods by ward ==
| Neighborhood | Ward | Area (mi^{2}) | Area (km^{2}) | Population | Established |
|---|---|---|---|---|---|
| Adams Morgan | I | 0.47 | 1.2 | 17,113 | 1958 |
| Columbia Heights | I | 0.85 | 2.2 | 31,696 | 1881 |
| Kalorama Triangle | I | | 0.21 | 3,941 | 1890 |
| Lanier Heights | I | | 0.2 | 3,549 | 1890 |
| LeDroit Park | I | | 0.41 | 2,407 | 1873 |
| Meridian Hill | I | | | 4,413 | 1867 |
| Mount Pleasant | I | | 0.95 | 11,432 | 1865 |
| Park View | I | 0.25 | 0.6 | 5,099 | |
| Pleasant Plains | I | | | | |
| U Street Corridor | I | | | 5,385 | |
| Woodley Park | I | | | | |
| Burleith | II | | | | |
| Chinatown | II | | | | |
| Downtown | II | | | | |
| Dupont Circle | II | | | | |
| Foggy Bottom | II | | | | |
| Georgetown | II | | | | |
| Sheridan-Kalorama | II | | | | |
| Logan Circle | II | | | | |
| Mount Vernon Square | II | | | | |

=== Ward 1 ===
Ward 1 (2023–present)

Ward 1 Councilmember: Brianne Nadeau
Population (2022): 88,846

- Adams Morgan
- Columbia Heights
- Howard University
- Kalorama Triangle
- LeDroit Park
- Lanier Heights
- Meridian Hill
- Mount Pleasant
- Park View
- Pleasant Plains
- Shaw (parts of the neighborhood are also in Ward 2)
- U Street Corridor (part of the neighborhood is also in Ward 2)

=== Ward 2 ===
Ward 2 (2023–present)

Ward 2 Councilmember: Brooke Pinto
Population (2022): 89,518

- Burleith
- Chinatown
- Downtown
- Dupont Circle
- Federal Triangle
- Foggy Bottom
- Georgetown
- Sheridan-Kalorama
- Logan Circle
- Mount Vernon Square (part of the neighborhood is also in Ward 6)
- Penn Quarter
- Shaw (parts of the neighborhood are also in Ward 1)
- Southwest Federal Center
- U Street Corridor (part of the neighborhood is also in Ward 1)
- West End

=== Ward 3 ===
Ward 3 (2023–present)

Ward 3 Councilmember: Matthew Frumin
Population (2022): 81,883

- American University Park
- Berkley
- Cathedral Heights
- Chevy Chase
- Cleveland Park
- Colony Hill
- Forest Hills
- Foxhall
- Friendship Heights
- Glover Park
- Kent
- Massachusetts Heights
- McLean Gardens
- North Cleveland Park
- Observatory Circle
- The Palisades
- Potomac Heights
- Spring Valley
- Tenleytown
- Wakefield
- Wesley Heights
- Woodland Normanstone
- Woodley Park

=== Ward 4 ===
Ward 4 (2023–present)

Ward 4 Councilmember: Janeese Lewis George
Population (2022): 83,996

- Barnaby Woods
- Brightwood
- Brightwood Park
- Chevy Chase (part of the neighborhood is also in Ward 3)
- Colonial Village
- Crestwood
- Fort Totten
- Hawthorne
- Manor Park
- Petworth
- Riggs Park (also known as Lamond Riggs)
- Shepherd Park
- Sixteenth Street Heights
- Takoma

=== Ward 5 ===
Ward 5 (2023–present)

Ward 5 Councilmember: Zachary Parker
Population (2022): 86,794

- Arboretum
- Bloomingdale
- Brentwood
- Brookland
- Carver Langston
- Eckington
- Edgewood
- Fort Lincoln
- Fort Totten
- Gateway
- Ivy City
- Langdon
- Michigan Park
- North Michigan Park
- Pleasant Hill
- Queens Chapel
- Riggs Park (part of the neighborhood is also in Ward 4)
- Stronghold
- Trinidad
- Truxton Circle
- Woodridge

=== Ward 6 ===
Ward 6 (2023–present)

Ward 6 Councilmember: Charles Allen
Population (2022): 99,652

- Buzzard Point
- Capitol Hill
- Lincoln Park
- Judiciary Square
- Mount Vernon Triangle
- Near Northeast
- NoMa
- Southwest Waterfront
- Sursum Corda
- Swampoodle (a neighborhood from the 1850s to the 1910s, replaced in large part today by NoMa and Near Northeast)

=== Ward 7 ===
Ward 7 (2023–present)

Ward 7 Councilmember: Wendell Felder
Population (2022): 77,456

- Benning
- Benning Heights
- Benning Ridge
- Burrville
- Capitol View
- Central Northeast
- Civic Betterment
- Deanwood
- Dupont Park
- East Corner
- East River Heights
- Eastland Gardens
- Fairfax Village
- Fort Davis
- Fort Dupont
- Fort Stanton
- Greenway
- Hill East
- Hillbrook
- Hillcrest
- Kenilworth
- Kingman Park
- Lincoln Heights
- Marshall Heights
- Mayfair
- Naylor Gardens
- Northeast Boundary
- Penn Branch
- Randle Highlands
- River Terrace
- Twining

=== Ward 8 ===
Ward 8 (2023–present)

Ward 8 Councilmember: Trayon White
Population (2022): 77,756

- Anacostia
- Barry Farm
- Bellevue
- Buena Vista
- Congress Heights
- Douglass
- Fairlawn
- Garfield Heights
- Good Hope
- Knox Hill
- Navy Yard
- Park Naylor
- Shipley Terrace
- Skyland
- Washington Highlands
- Woodland
