= Greenway (Washington, D.C.) =

- Neighborhood
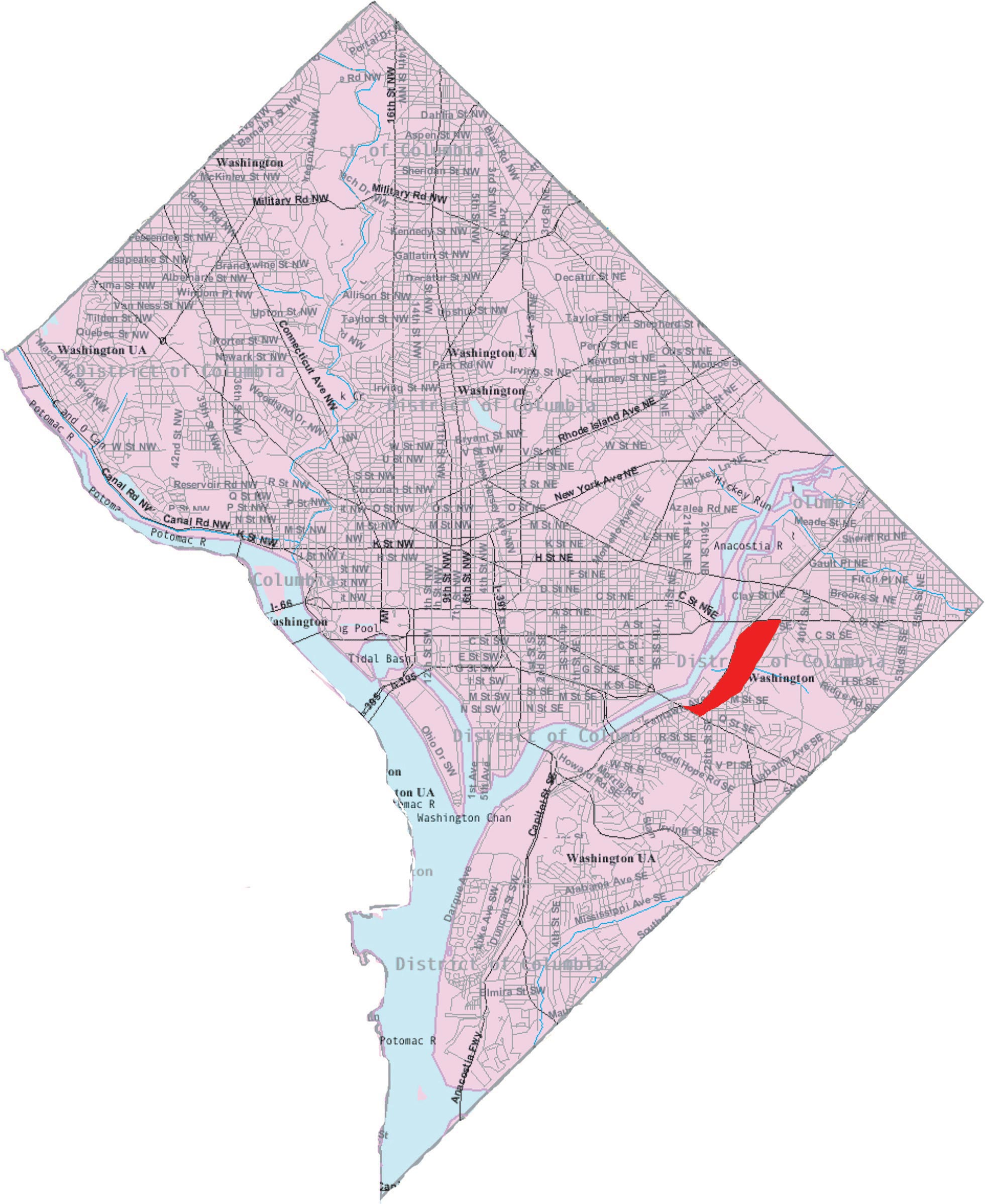
- Map of Washington, D.C., with the Greenway neighborhood highlighted in red
- Coordinates: 38°53′0.3012″N 076°57′36.558″W
- Country: United States
- District: Washington, D.C.
- Ward: Ward 7
- Constructed: 1940

Government
  - Councilmember: Wendell Felder

Greenway is a residential neighborhood in Southeast Washington, D.C., in the United States. The neighborhood is bounded by East Capitol Street SE, Interstate 295 SE, Fairlawn Avenue SE, Minnesota Avenue SE, Pennsylvania Avenue SE,

The western part of the Greenway neighborhood was marshland and riverbank until a major dredging and land reclamation project by the United States Army Corps of Engineers, begun in the early 1880s, transformed the area into habitable space. The southern part of Greenway developed out of the failed 1871 East Washington Heights luxury home development project, and the far more successful 1903 North Randle Highlands middle-class housing project. The northern part of Greenway was constructed in 1940 as a massive low-income apartment housing project for defense workers. The neighborhood draws its name from this 1940 development.

As of the start of the 21st century, residents of Greenway are largely poor, and the neighborhood is characterized by multi-family homes and public housing projects.

== Creation of Anacostia Park ==
Prior to the arrival of European settlers in the 18th century, the Anacostia River was a fast-flowing and relatively silt-free river with very few mudflats or marshes. White settlers cleared much of the surrounding forest for farmland, however, and extensive soil erosion led to a heavy load of silt and effluent in the Anacostia. The construction of the Pennsylvania Avenue, Benning, and other bridges and the diversion of inflowing streams to agricultural use also slowed the river's current, allowing much of the silt to settle and be deposited. Between 1860 and the late 1880s, large mudflats ("the Anacostia flats") formed on both banks of the Anacostia River due to this deforestation and runoff. At this time, the city allowed its sewage to pour untreated into the Anacostia. Marsh grass began growing in the flats, trapping the sewage and leading public health experts to conclude that the flats were unsanitary. Health officials also feared that the flats were a prime breeding ground for malaria- and yellow fever-carrying mosquitoes.

In 1898, officials with the United States Army Corps of Engineers and the District of Columbia convinced the United States Congress that the Anacostia River should be dredged to create a more commercially viable channel that would enhance the local economy as well as provide land where factories or warehouses might be built. The material dredged from the river would be used to build up the flats and turn them into dry land, eliminating the public health dangers they caused.

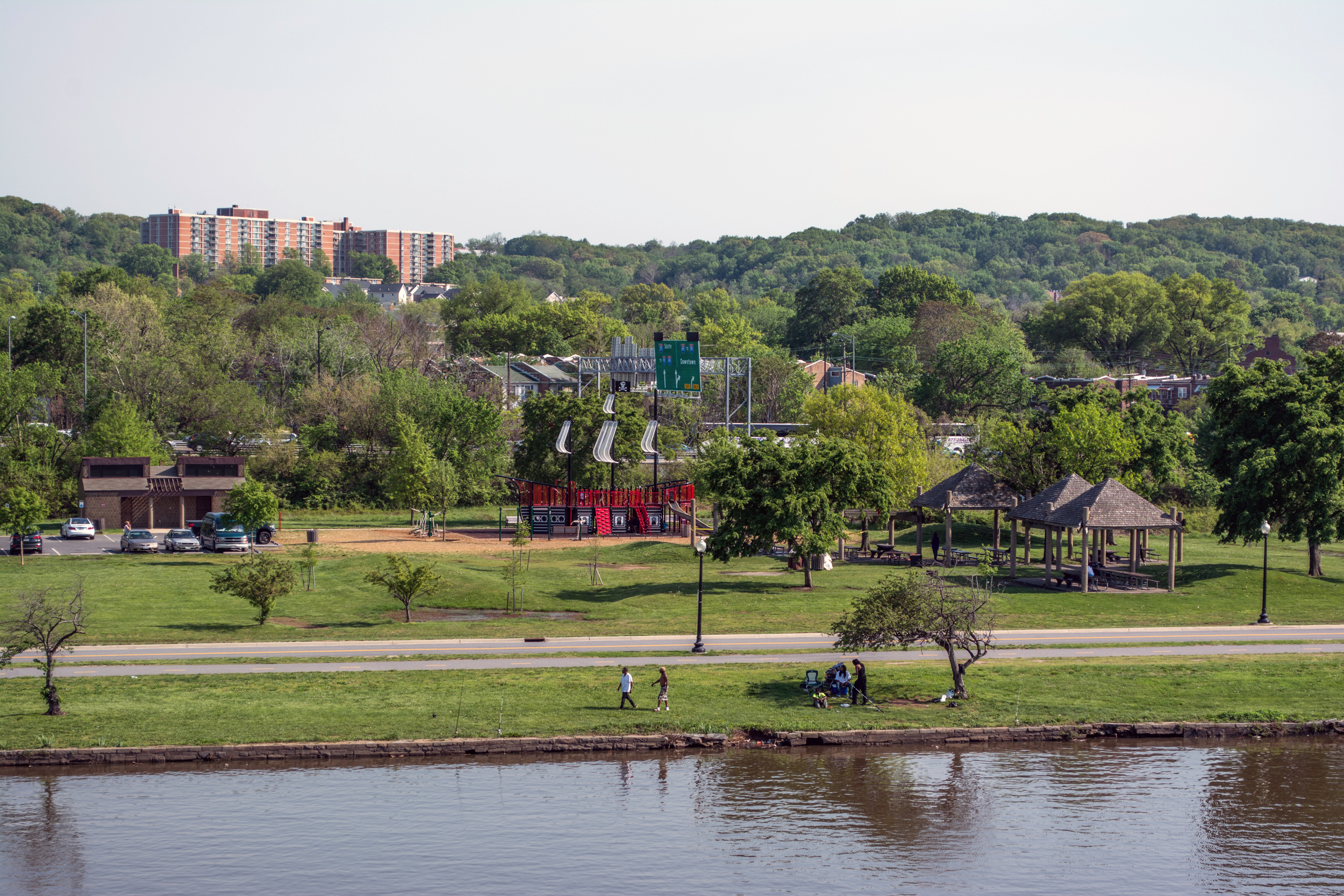
A playground in Section D of Anacostia Park in May 2014 in Washington, D.C., in the United States. The Anacostia River flows in the foreground.

The original dredging plan called for a channel 15 feet (4.6 m) wide on the Anacostia's west bank from the 11th Street Bridges to Massachusetts Avenue SE, narrowing to a 9 feet (2.7 m) wide channel from Massachusetts Avenue SE to the Maryland-District border line. In addition to this channel (which was meant to facilitate the passage of cargo ships) the McMillan Commission proposed building a dam across the Anacostia River at Massachusetts Avenue SE or at Benning Bridge to form a large lake for fishing and recreational boating. The Commission also proposed using dredged material to build islands within the lake. The Washington Post reported in July 1914 that Congress had approved the plan for a dam on the river at Massachusetts Avenue SE. By 1916, the Corps of Engineers was still planning a dam, with access to the 9 feet (2.7 m) deep lake behind it controlled by locks. The Corps also planned to create several large islands in the lake and planned to replace Benning Bridge with a drawbridge to accommodate the cargo traffic through the lake. The firm of Sanford and Brooks began the dredging in January 1903, at which time the Army Corps of Engineers began surveying the surrounding land to determine whether the federal government or private landowners had title to the marshes themselves. The survey work was complete by November 1905, with the U.S. government asserting ownership over the flats.

Decisions on how to use the newly created land were not resolved until 1914. In 1900, the United States Senate established the McMillan Commission, a body to advise the Congress and District of Columbia on ways to improve the parks, monuments, memorials, and infrastructure of the city as well as plan for urban renewal, economic growth, and expansion of the federal government. The McMillan Commission concluded that commercial land was not needed and proposed turning the reclaimed flats into parkland. The D.C. government agreed in 1905, and the United States Commission of Fine Arts (a federal advisory agency with review authority over the design and aesthetics of projects within Washington, D.C.) and the Army Corps of Engineers concurred in 1914. Most of the reclaimed mudflats were subsequently declared to be parkland and named Anacostia Water Park (now Anacostia Park) in 1919.

In 1920, Congress specifically prohibited the Corps from extending Anacostia Park beyond Benning Bridge, which forced the Corps to drop its plans for a drawbridge. In late 1922, dredging ceased after funding for continued dredging ran out. In 1934, the Corps of Engineers transferred ownership of the Anacostia Flats and Kingman Lake to the National Park Service.

== Development of the settlement of Greenway ==
At the start of the 1800s, the Greenway area was mostly farms and forest. The only road in the area connected the Navy Yard Bridge with the Maryland town of Upper Marlboro. The road was open by at least 1812. The Uniontown "suburb" was platted at the foot of the Navy Yard Bridge in 1854, and development slowly began to turn the agricultural land into businesses and residences. Although a Pennsylvania Avenue Bridge had been constructed in 1804 linking Pennsylvania Avenue SE over the Anacostia River, it burned to the waterline in 1846. The destruction of the bridge significantly slowed growth in the area for five decades.

=== East Washington Heights ===
About 1871, a real estate development known as "East Washington Heights" began. East Washington Heights was bounded by Massachusetts Avenue SE, Southern Avenue, Naylor Road SE, and Minnesota Avenue SE. A trapezoid with its base along Southern Avenue, it was almost bisected northwest-to-southeast by Pennsylvania Avenue SE. Intended to be a "suburb" of "the city" catering to wealthy individuals, it never took off. Nevertheless, citizens in the areas that would later become Dupont Park, Fairfax Village, Fort Davis, Hillcrest, Penn Branch, Randle Highlands, and Twining wanted a bridge to reconnect "their" Pennsylvania Avenue (which ran through the center of their neighborhoods) with the Pennsylvania Avenue "in the city". Construction of the new bridge began in November 1887, and it was opened and dedicated on August 25, 1890.

Construction of the 1890 bridge led to extensive new development just south of the Greenway neighborhood. As the bridge was being built in 1889, a consortium known as the Bliss-Havemeyer Syndicate (which included Representative Archibald M. Bliss, New York state bed manufacturer Erwin C. Carpenter, Representative Thomas J. Clunie, Senator and railroad attorney Chauncey Depew, Senator George Hearst, and sugar refining magnate John W. Havemeyer) purchased 800 acres (3,200,000 m^{2}) of land in the former East Washington Heights development. They built a number of roads in the area, and landscaped the plots along Pennsylvania Avenue SE, Alabama Avenue SE, and Branch Avenue SE with gardens, orchards, pavilions, and shade trees. On June 18, 1898, Congress chartered the East Washington Heights Traction Company to provide streetcar service in the new development. The company was authorized to build a new railroad bridge over the Anacostia River parallel to the Pennsylvania Avenue Bridge. Congress required is streetcars to run from Barney Circle across the bridge to Pennsylvania Avenue SE, down Pennsylvania Avenue SE to the District border with Maryland. A branch line would travel south from Pennsylvania Avenue SE along Branch Avenue, and then southwest at Bowen Road (now Alabama Avenue SE) to the intersection with Harrison Street (now Good Hope Road SE), where a neighborhood called "Good Hope" was growing. Another branch line left Pennsylvania Avenue SE at Minnesota Avenue SE, and traveled along Minnesota Avenue to Harrison Street. A third branch line left Pennsylvania Avenue SE at 28th Street SE, traveled north to Anacostia Road SE, and the followed Anacostia Road SE to the neighborhood of East Washington Park (now the neighborhoods of Greenway and Fort Dupont). The firm incorporated on August 13, 1898.

The Bliss-Havemeyer Syndicate collapsed, however, when Havemeyer and Hearst died and Bliss became seriously ill, and only a few homes were built.

=== North Randle Highlands ===
However, in 1903, Colonel Arthur E. Randle (Note: Randle, a graduate of the University of Pennsylvania, received the commission of colonel in the Mississippi State Militia from Andrew H. Longino, Governor of the state of Mississippi, in 1902.) formed the United States Realty Company, bought out the Bliss-Havemeyer Syndicate properties and East Washington Heights Traction Company, and founded the settlement of Randle Highlands. Randle, who only arrived in Washington in 1885, had previously founded Congress Heights in 1890. The Congress Heights development was wildly successful, and Randle invested heavily in the Belt Railway, a local streetcar company. In 1895, the Capital Railway Company extended its streetcar lines over the Navy Yard Bridge and down Nicholls Avenue to Congress Heights. (Note: The Capitol, North O Street, and South Washington Railway Company was chartered by Congress on March 3, 1875. By act of Congress enacted on February 18, 1893, it changed its name to the Belt Railway. The Belt Railway was purchased on June 24, 1898, by the Anacostia and Potomac River Railway Company, which itself had been founded on May 19, 1872, but not chartered by Congress until February 18, 1875. Randle founded the Capital Railway Company on March 2, 1895, to own and construct the extension to Congress Heights, and made it a division of the Anacostia and Potomac River Railway in 1899. The Washington Railway and Electric Company purchased a controlling share in the Anacostia and Potomac River Railway on August 31, 1912.) Randle sold his interest in the Capital Railway in 1899, and used this fortune to buy out the Bliss-Havemeyer Syndicate.

In 1902, Randle won approval from Congress to lay streetcar tracks across the Pennsylvania Avenue Bridge. By 1905, he had extended his line 0.75 miles (1.21 km) down Pennsylvania Avenue SE into the new Randle Highlands.

The streetcar line over the bridge spurred extensive new development east of the river. Randle began selling lots in Randle Highlands at a brisk pace in 1903. He made so much money that by 1905 he formed the development of "North Randle Highlands" (now the neighborhoods of Dupont Park, Penn Branch, and the lower portion of Greenway), which extended to Massachusetts Avenue SE. Lots in North Randle Highlands sold even more swiftly than in Randle Highlands. In October 1906, The Washington Post called Randle's developments "among the largest real estate enterprises ever successfully carried through in the District."

=== Greenway ===
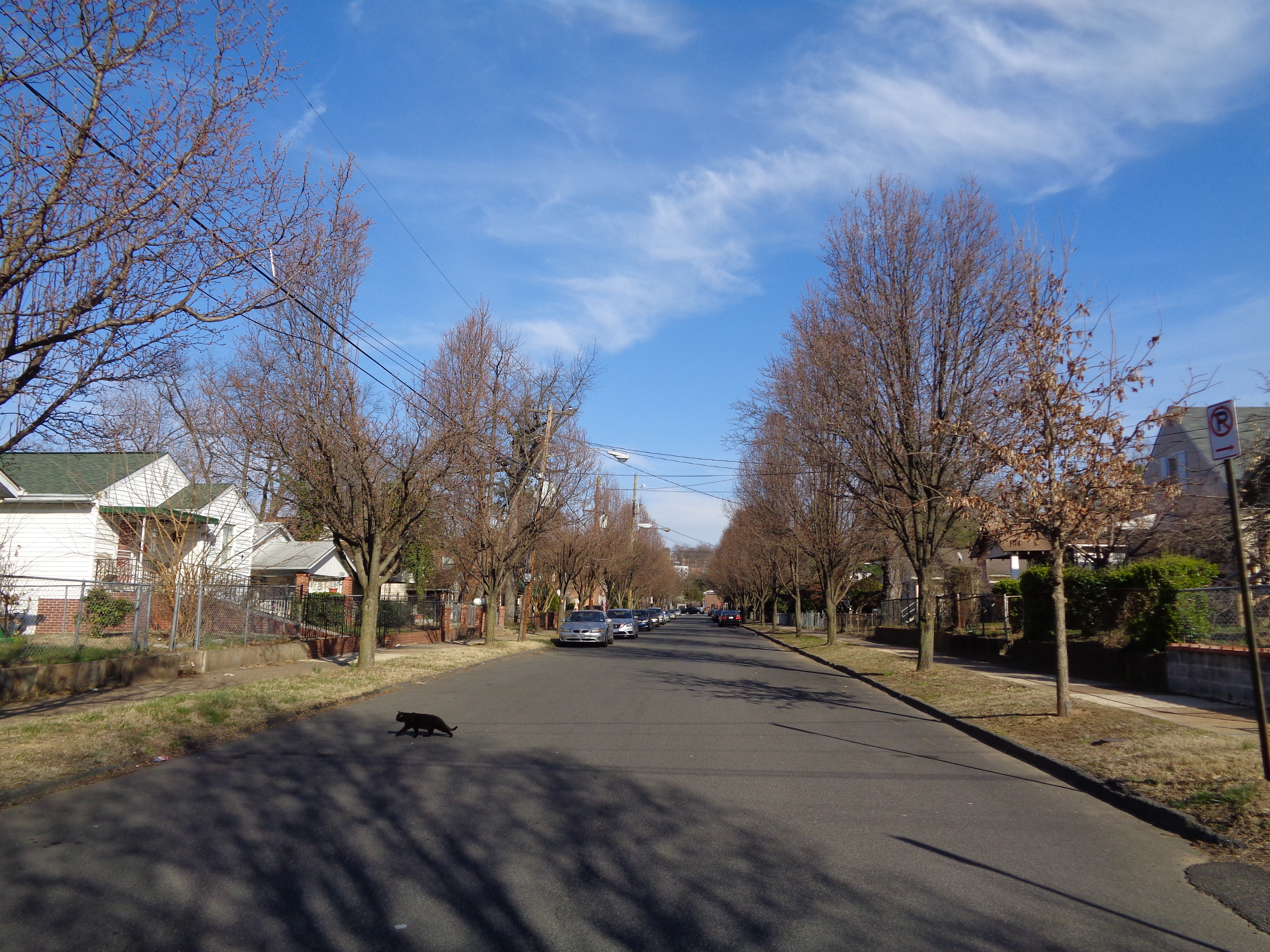
Greenway neighborhood at the intersection of D St. and 33rd St. SE

The northern part of the Greenway neighborhood — and the name "Greenway" itself — came about in 1940. With the United States mobilizing for potential war in Europe and the Pacific, the United States Department of War was rapidly expanding its workforce in the city. In 1939, the Washington Housing Association (a federal agency engaged in slum clearance and the construction of modern, low-cost housing in the District of Columbia), asked real estate developer Morris Cafritz to construct a large, low-cost housing development east of the Anacostia River. Economic conditions made that impractical. But by mid-1940, with the economy doing significantly better, Cafritz began designing a new $3 million, low-income settlement he called "Greenway". Built on 30 acres (120,000 m^{2}) of land bounded by East Capitol Street, Minnesota Avenue SE, and Anacostia Park, the settlement consisted of 75 to 80 apartment buildings. Designed by architect Harry Edwards, each building had 11 units ranging in size from studios to two-bedrooms. Seventeen apartment buildings were constructed by November 1940, with nearly all the remainder of the project open by late 1941. In 1941, the 796-unit Greenway Apartments was constructed in the neighborhood. The following year, the Stoddert Dwellings public housing project were completed as well. But these single-family homes were little more than wood shacks, and by 1948 were in decrepit condition.

As of the early 21st century, the Greenway neighborhood consisted of substandard or near-substandard multi-family homes and large and small public housing projects. Residents in the area are almost all poor or working poor.

== Geographic landmarks ==
Anacostia Park and the Anacostia River lie just beyond Interstate 295 to the west of Greenway. The citizens of Greenway have no access to the park or waterfront as there is no way for pedestrians or vehicles to get past the freeway and railway tracks which separate the neighborhood from the park and water. Fort Dupont Park lies adjacent to a portion of Greenway to the east. An unnamed stream (referred to as the "Fort Dupont tributary") exits the park and bisects the Greenway neighborhood to empty into the Anacostia River. The area around the "Fort Dupont tributary" is undeveloped, and consists primarily of deciduous trees and brush.

Another creek, Pope Branch, bisects the lower half of the Greenway neighborhood. Pope Branch Park, a city-owned and maintained park, surrounds the stream. The Anacostia Park Skating Pavilion lies opposite Penn Branch, and provides free indoor roller skating.

Kimball Playground, a District of Columbia-owned public recreational facility, is adjacent to Greenway between Ely Place SE and F Street SE, across Minnesota Avenue SE. The playground contains athletic fields, a full-size and a half-size baseball diamond, tennis courts, and basketball courts.

== Bibliography ==
- Abrams, Brett L. (2008). Capital Sporting Grounds: A History of Stadium and Ballpark Construction in Washington, D.C. Jefferson, N.C.: Mcfarland. ISBN 9780786452507.
- Burr, Charles R. (1920). "A Brief History of Anacostia, Its Name, Origin and Progress". Records of the Columbia Historical Society, Washington, D.C.: 167–179.
- Busey, S.C. (1899). "The History and Progress of Sanitation in the City of Washington, and the Efforts of the Medical Profession in Relation Thereto". Annual Addresses of the President of the Medical Society of the District of Columbia. Washington, D.C.: Medical Society of the District of Columbia.
- Committee on Banking and Currency (1948). General Housing. U.S. Senate. 80th Cong., 2d sess. Washington, D.C.: U.S. Government Printing Office.
- Coues, Elliott; Prentiss, D. Webster (1883). "Avifauna Columbiana". Bulletin of the United States National Museum.
- Department of Environmental Programs. Metropolitan Washington Council of Governments (April 2000). Fort Dupont Subwatershed Restoration: 1999 Baseline Stream Assessment Study – Physical, Chemical and Biological Conditions (PDF) (Report). Washington, D.C.: Metropolitan Washington Council of Governments.
- District of Columbia Highway Department (1948). A Pictorial Report on Highway Bridges and Structures in the District of Columbia Prepared for the Commissioners of the District of Columbia. Washington, D.C.: Public Roads Administration.
- Fennell, Margaret L. (1948). Corporations Chartered By Special Act of Congress. Washington, D.C.: Library of Congress.
- General Services Administration (2012). Department of Homeland Security Headquarters Consolidation at St. Elizabeths Master Plan Amendment, East Campus North Parcel: Environmental Impact Statement. Washington, D.C.: General Services Administration.
- Gutheim, Frederick A.; Lee, Antoinette J. (2006). Worthy of the Nation: Washington, D.C., From L'Enfant to the National Capital Planning Commission. Baltimore, Md.: Johns Hopkins University Press. ISBN 9780801883286.
- Miller, Frederic; Gillette, Howard (1995). Washington Seen: A Photographic History, 1875-1965. Baltimore, Md.: Johns Hopkins University Press. ISBN 0801849799.
- Proctor, John Clagett; Black, Frank P.; Williams, E. Melvin (1930). Washington, Past and Present: A History. New York: Lewis Historical Publishing Co.
- Secretary of State (1898). Statutes of the United States of America Passed at the Second Session of the Fifty-Fifth Congress, 1897-1898. Washington D.C.: Government Printing Office.
- Smith, Kathryn Schneider (2010). Washington At Home: An Illustrated History of Neighborhoods in the Nation's Capital. Baltimore, Md.: Johns Hopkins University Press. ISBN 9780801893537.
- Subcommittee on the District of Columbia (1999). District of Columbia Metropolitan Police Department Oversight and Federal Law Enforcement Assistance. Committee on Government Reform and Oversight. U.S. House of Representatives. 105th Cong., 2d sess. Washington, D.C.: U.S. Government Printing Office.
- Tindall, William (1918). "Beginnings of Street Railways in the National Capital". Records of the Columbia Historical Society, Washington, D.C.: 24–86.
- Todd, Charles Burr (1889). The Story of Washington, the National Capital. New York: G.P. Putnam's Sons. p. 76. "Eastern Branch Road."
