= Fort Stanton =

Fort Stanton may refer to:

- Fort Stanton (New Mexico), U.S. Army fort later Marine Corps hospital
- Fort Stanton (Washington, D.C.), a Civil War-era fortification
- Fort Stanton, Washington, D.C., a residential neighborhood in Washington, D.C.
- Fort Stanton–Snowy River Cave National Conservation Area, a National Conservation Area in New Mexico
