= Fort Stanton, Washington, D.C. =

Fort Stanton
- Neighborhood of Washington, D.C.
- Interactive map of Fort Stanton
- Coordinates: 38.8556°N 76.9795°W
- Country: United States
- District: Washington, D.C.
- Ward: Ward 7

Government
  - Councilmember: Wendell Felder

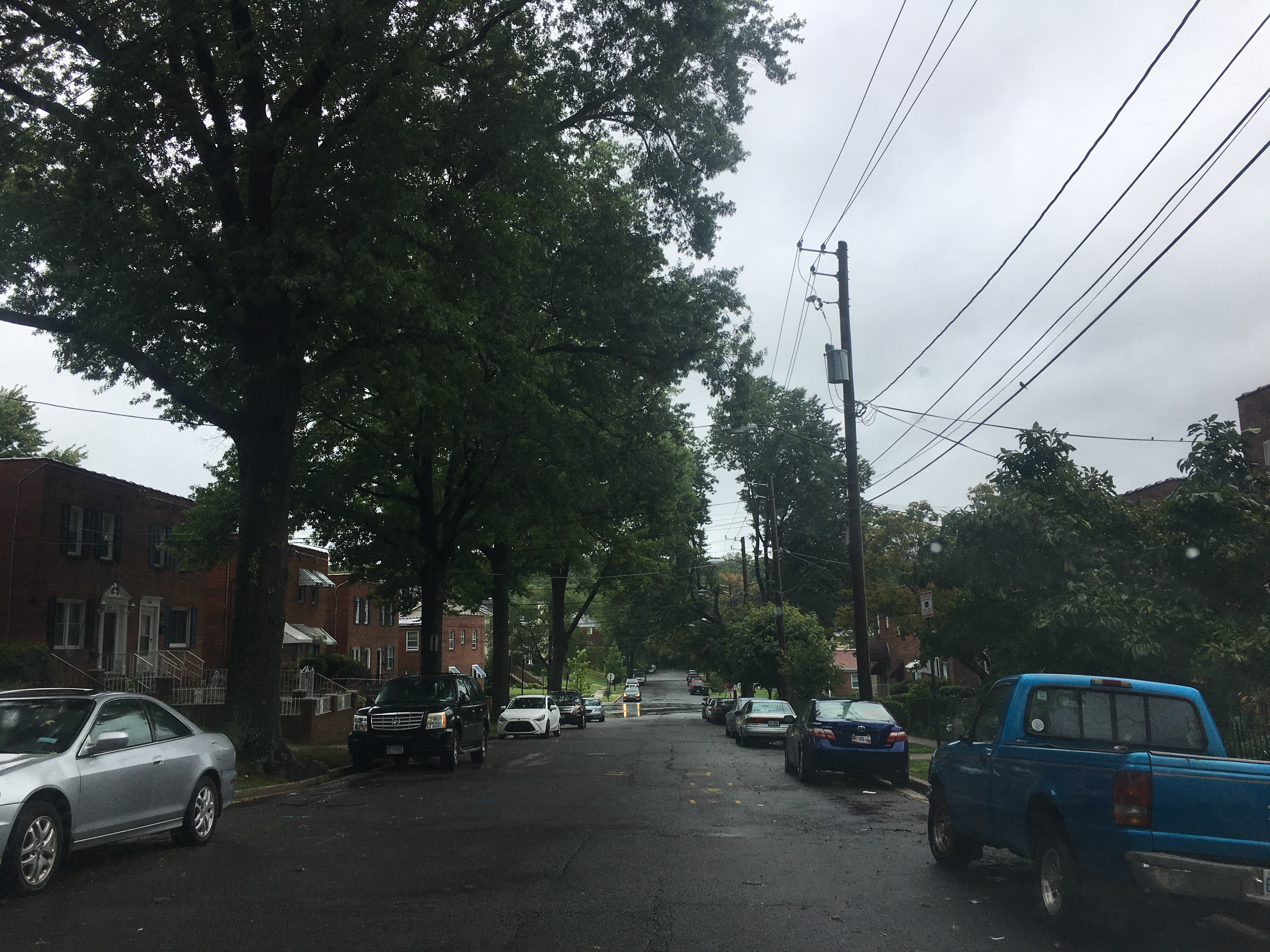
Fort Stanton neighborhood at the intersection of Morris Road and 18th St SE, in September 2018

Fort Stanton is a residential neighborhood in Southeast Washington, D.C.. It is bounded by Erie St SE. to the north, Suitland Parkway to the south, 16th St. SE to the west, and 19th Pl SE to the east. The neighborhood is named after the nearby civil War defense Fort Stanton. Fort Stanton is part of Ward 7, represented by Vince Gray. Fort Stanton is situated between the neighborhoods of Anacostia, to the north, Barry Farm to the west, Garfield Heights to the East, and Douglass to the south.

The nearby Anacostia Community Museum is located in Fort Stanton, as well as the nearby Fort Stanton Recreation Center and Fort Stanton Pool.
