= Civic Betterment =

Coordinates: 38°52′45.5″N 76°55′44.1″W

- Neighborhood of Washington, D.C.
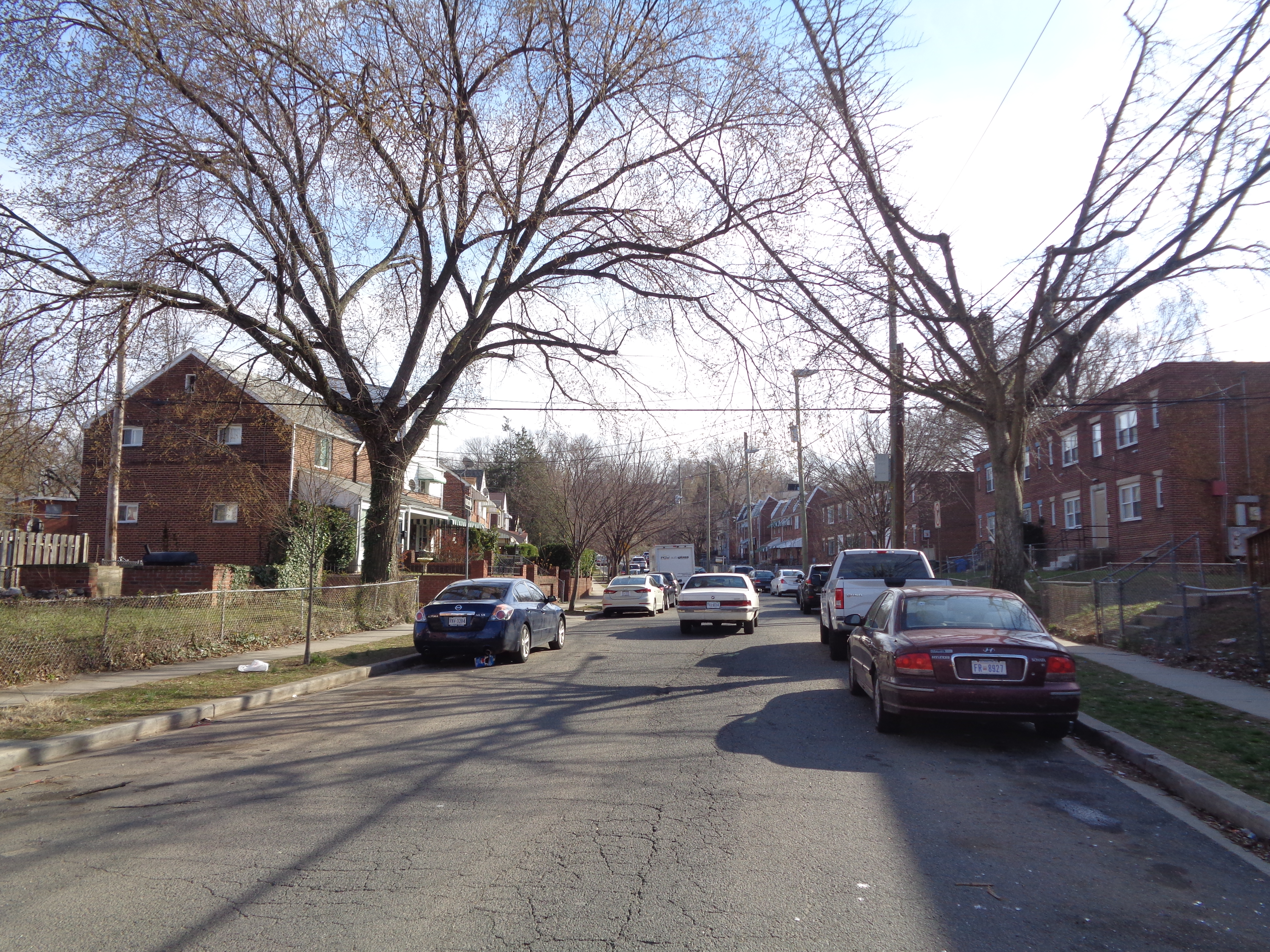
- The Civic Betterment neighborhood at the intersection of 51st and Southern Ave SE

- Civic Betterment within the District of Columbia
- Country: United States
- District: Washington, D.C.
- Ward: Ward 7

Government
  - Councilmember: Wendell Felder

Civic Betterment is a small neighborhood in Southeast Washington, D.C., on the border of Prince George's County, Maryland.

It is triangular in area, bounded by:

- G and Fitch Streets SE to the north
- Benning Road SE to the southwest
- Southern Avenue to the southeast
