= Twining (Washington, D.C.) =

Coordinates: 38.8714°N 76.9658°W

- Neighborhood of Washington, D.C.
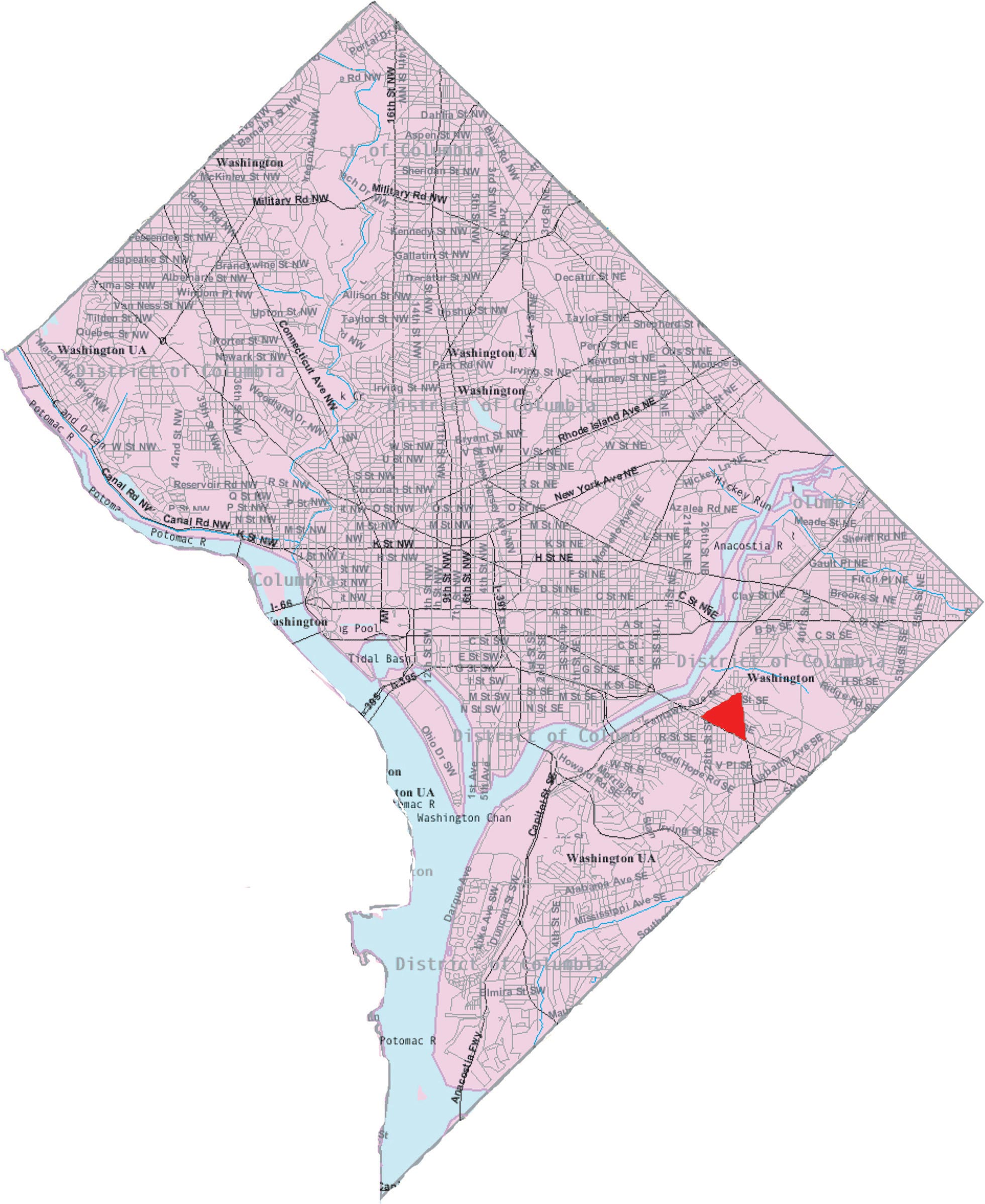
- Twining within the District of Columbia
- Country: United States
- District: Washington, D.C.
- Ward: Ward 7

Government
  - Councilmember: Wendell Felder

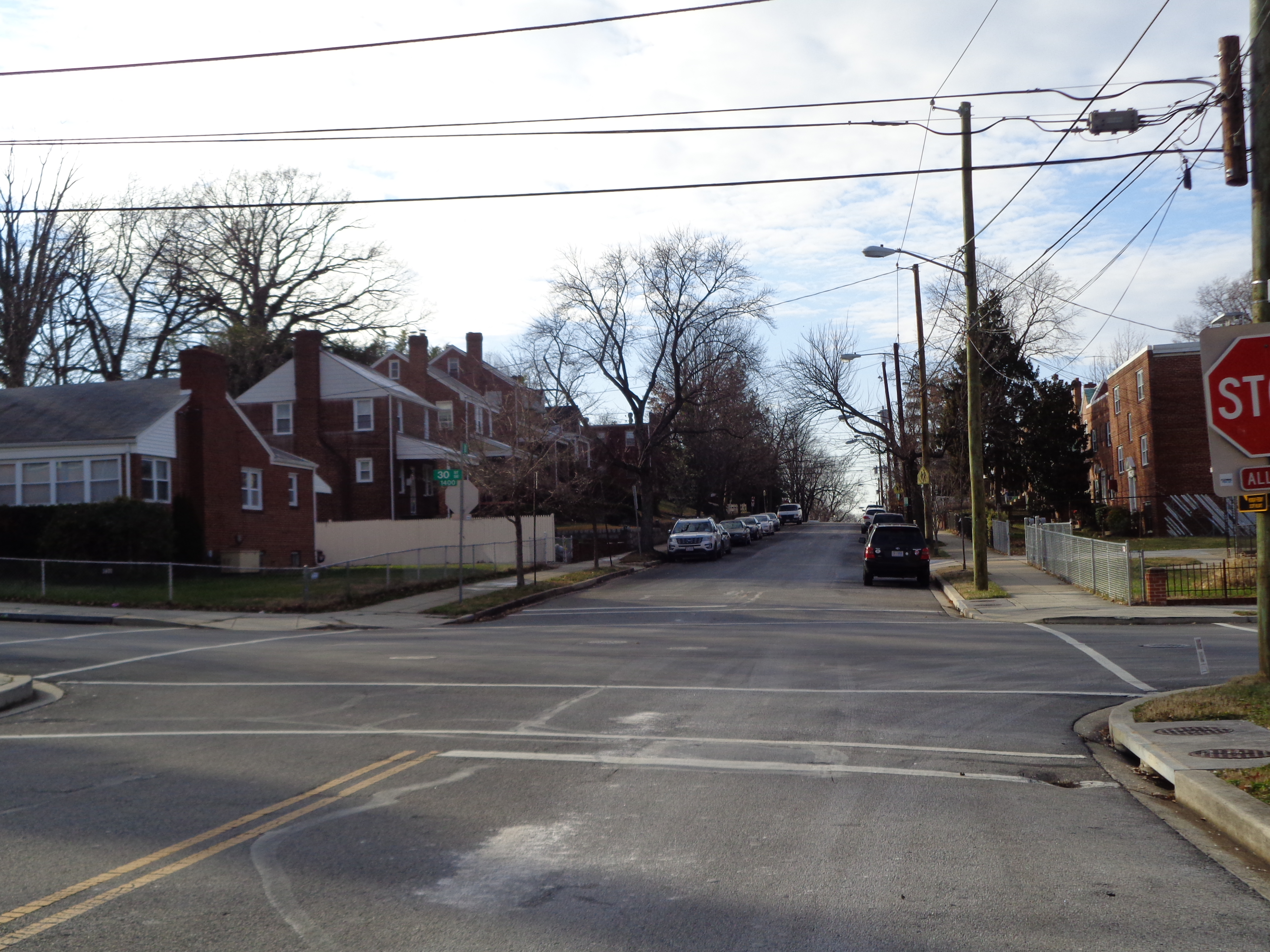
The intersection of 30th and O St., SE, in Twining, December 2017

Twining is a neighborhood in Southeast Washington, D.C., near the eastern bank of the Anacostia River. It is bounded by Minnesota Avenue NE to the northeast, Branch Avenue to the northwest, and Pennsylvania Avenue to the south. The Fort Dupont year-round ice skating rink, and the Smithsonian Anacostia Community Museum are nearby.

It is named for Major William Johnson Twining, who served as Military Commissioner of the District of Columbia from 1878 until his death in 1882.

== See also ==
- Anacostia
