= Penn Branch =

Coordinates: 38.8733°N 76.9572°W

- Neighborhood of Washington, D.C.
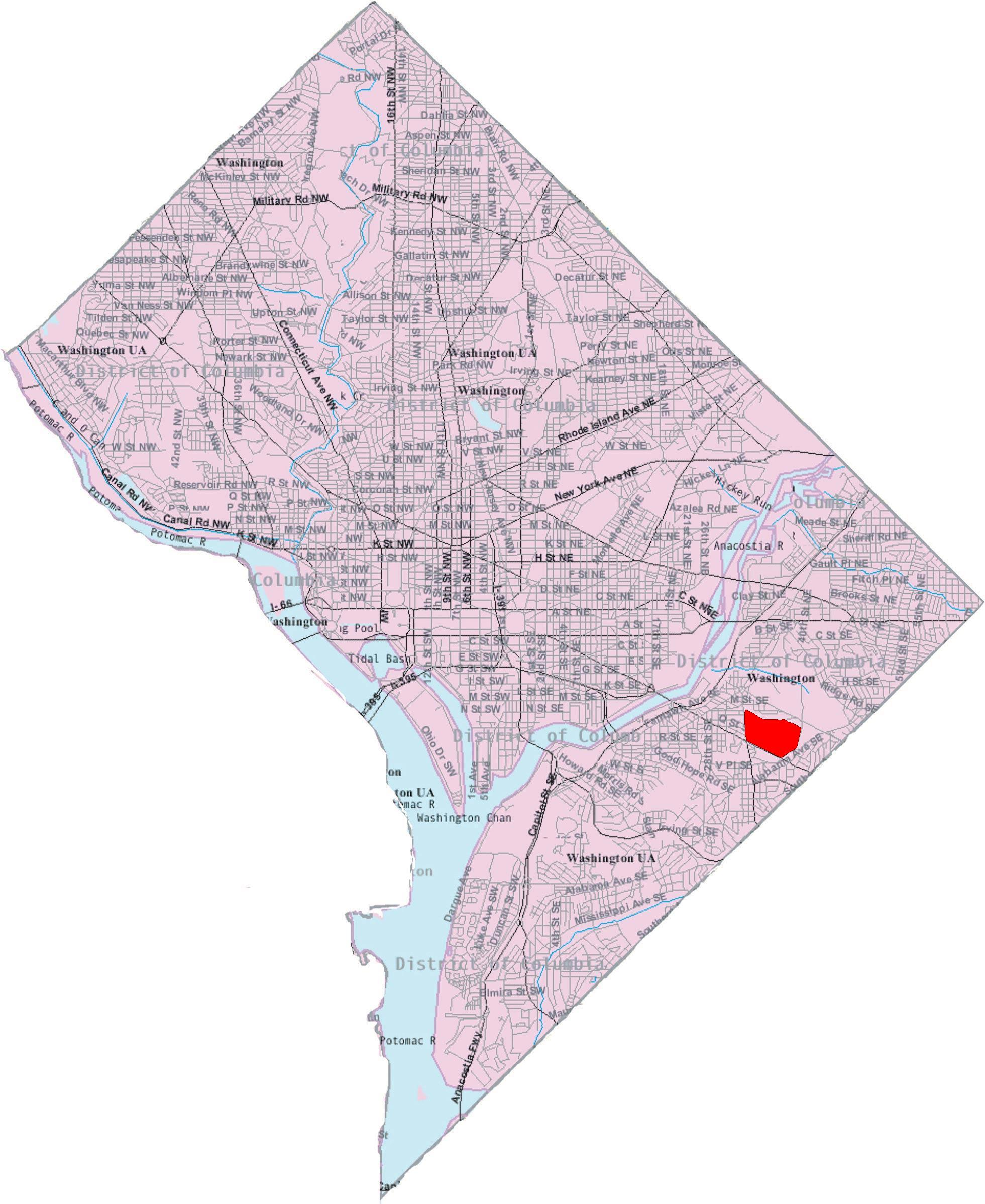
- Penn Branch within the District of Columbia
- Country: United States
- District: Washington, D.C.
- Ward: Ward 7

Government
  - Councilmember: Wendell Felder

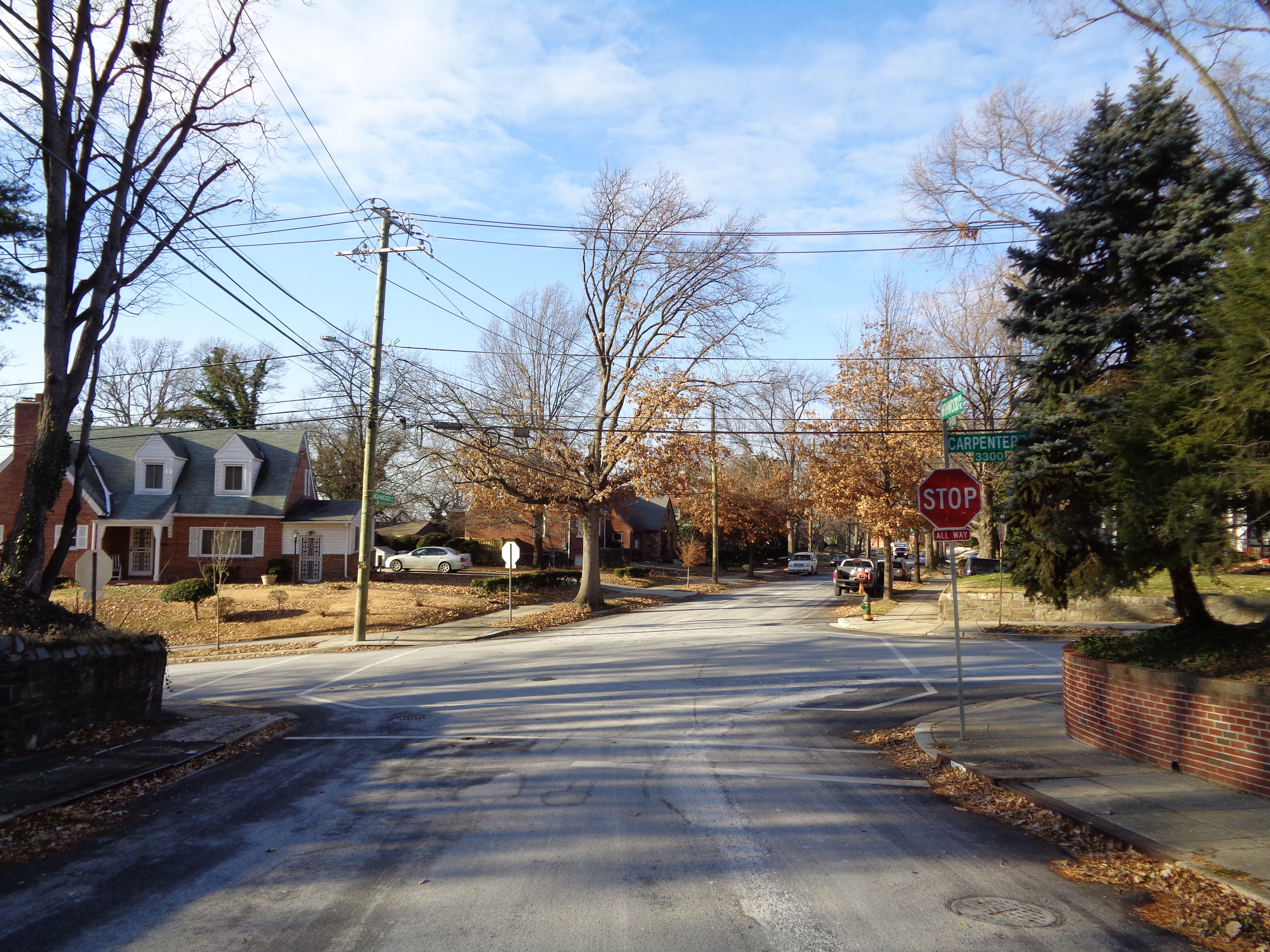
Intersection of Carpenter and Highwood St., SE in Penn Branch, December 2017

Penn Branch is a neighborhood in Southeast Washington, D.C., east of the Anacostia River. It is bounded by Pennsylvania Avenue SE to the south; Pope Branch Park and Pope Creek to the north; Branch Avenue to the west; and Fort Davis Park to the east. ‘Penn Branch’, takes its name from its location at the intersection of two major thoroughfares, Pennsylvania and Branch Avenue (the Washington continuation of Maryland Route 5).

Penn Branch and neighboring Hillcrest, Fort Dupont and Dupont Park are conveniently located close to the rapidly developing Capitol Hill and is about 15 minutes from the U.S. Capitol. The area is convenient to the Southeast-Southwest Freeway, and is also popular for its treelined streets, American Craftsman bungalow, Federal, Mid-Atlantic Colonial Revival, and Tudor Revival homes. The area has an altitude higher than most of Washington.

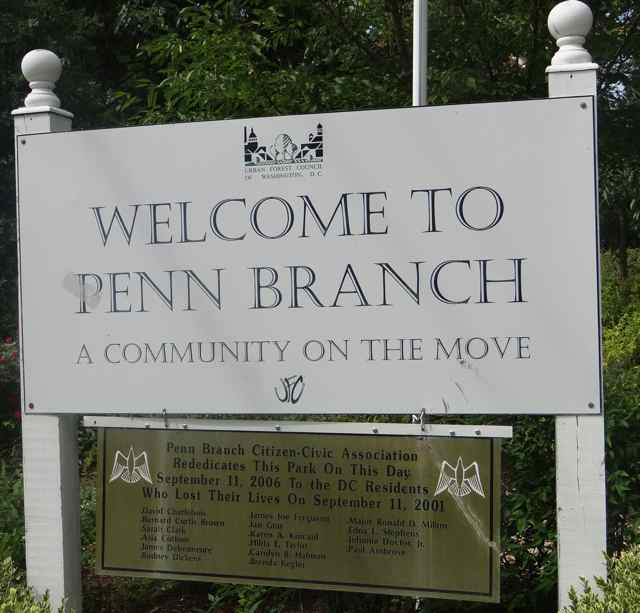
At the neighborhood's Pennsylvania Avenue gateway, a sign reads, "Penn Branch - A Community On The Move".
