= Southeast (Washington, D.C.) =

Coordinates: 38.87°N 76.98°W

- Quadrant
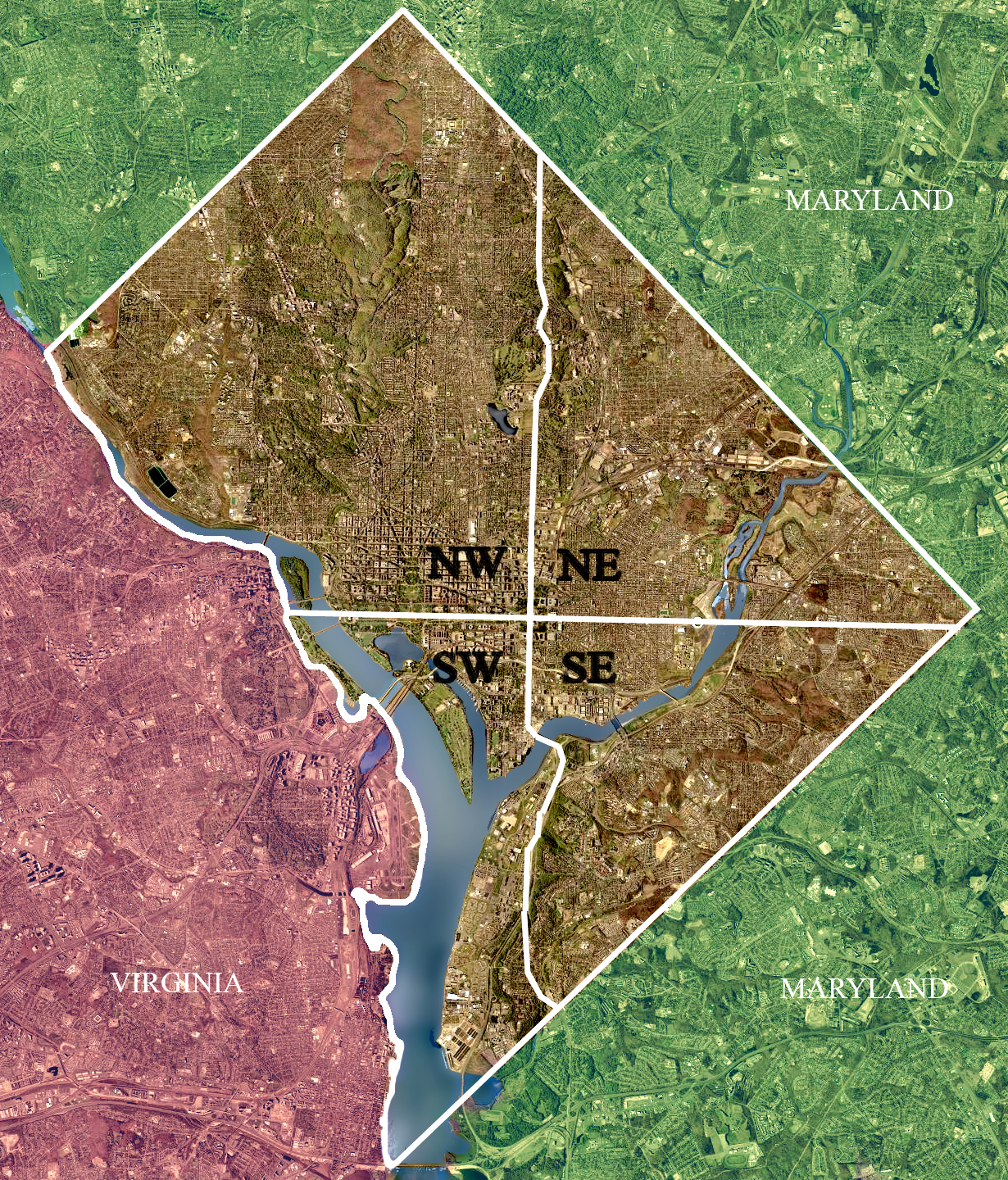
- Color-enhanced USGS satellite image of Washington, D.C., taken April 26, 2002. The "crosshairs" in the image mark the quadrant divisions of Washington, with the U.S. Capitol at the center of the dividing lines. To the west of the Capitol extends the National Mall, visible as a thin green band in the image. The Northwest quadrant is the largest, located north of the Mall and west of North Capitol Street.
- Interactive map of Southeast
- Country: United States
- District: Washington, D.C.

Southeast (SE or S.E.) is the southeastern quadrant of Washington, D.C., the capital of the United States, and is located south of East Capitol Street and east of South Capitol Street. It includes the Capitol Hill, Hill East, and Anacostia neighborhoods, the Navy Yard, the Joint Base Anacostia-Bolling (JBAB), the U.S. Marine Barracks, the Anacostia River waterfront, Eastern Market, the remains of several Civil War-era forts, historic St. Elizabeths Hospital, RFK Stadium, Nationals Park, and the Congressional Cemetery. It also contains a landmark known as "The Big Chair," located on Martin Luther King Jr. Avenue. The quadrant is split by the Anacostia River, with the portion that is west of the river sometimes referred to as "Near Southeast". Geographically, it is the second-smallest quadrant of the city.

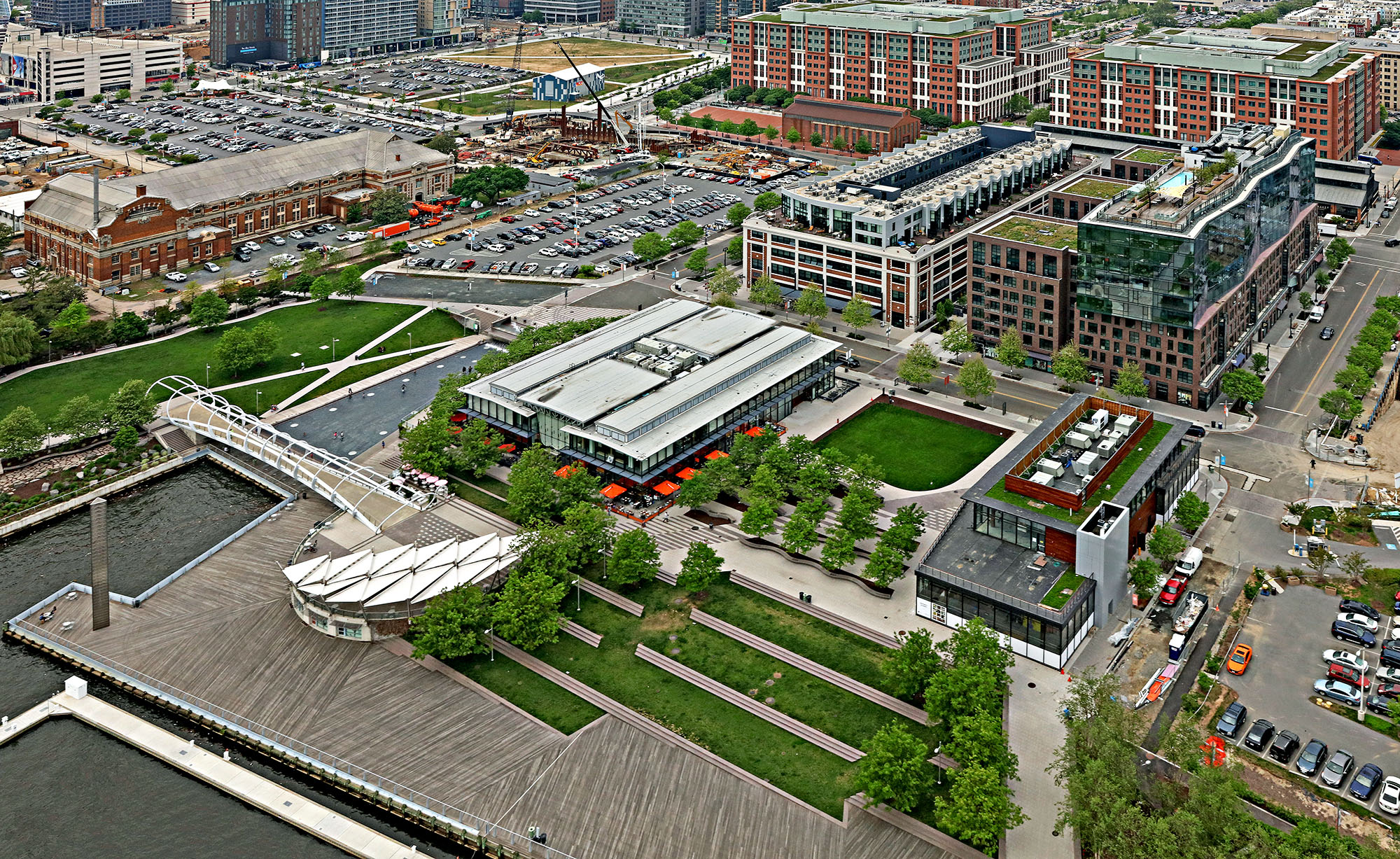
The Yards Park at the Anacostia River Front

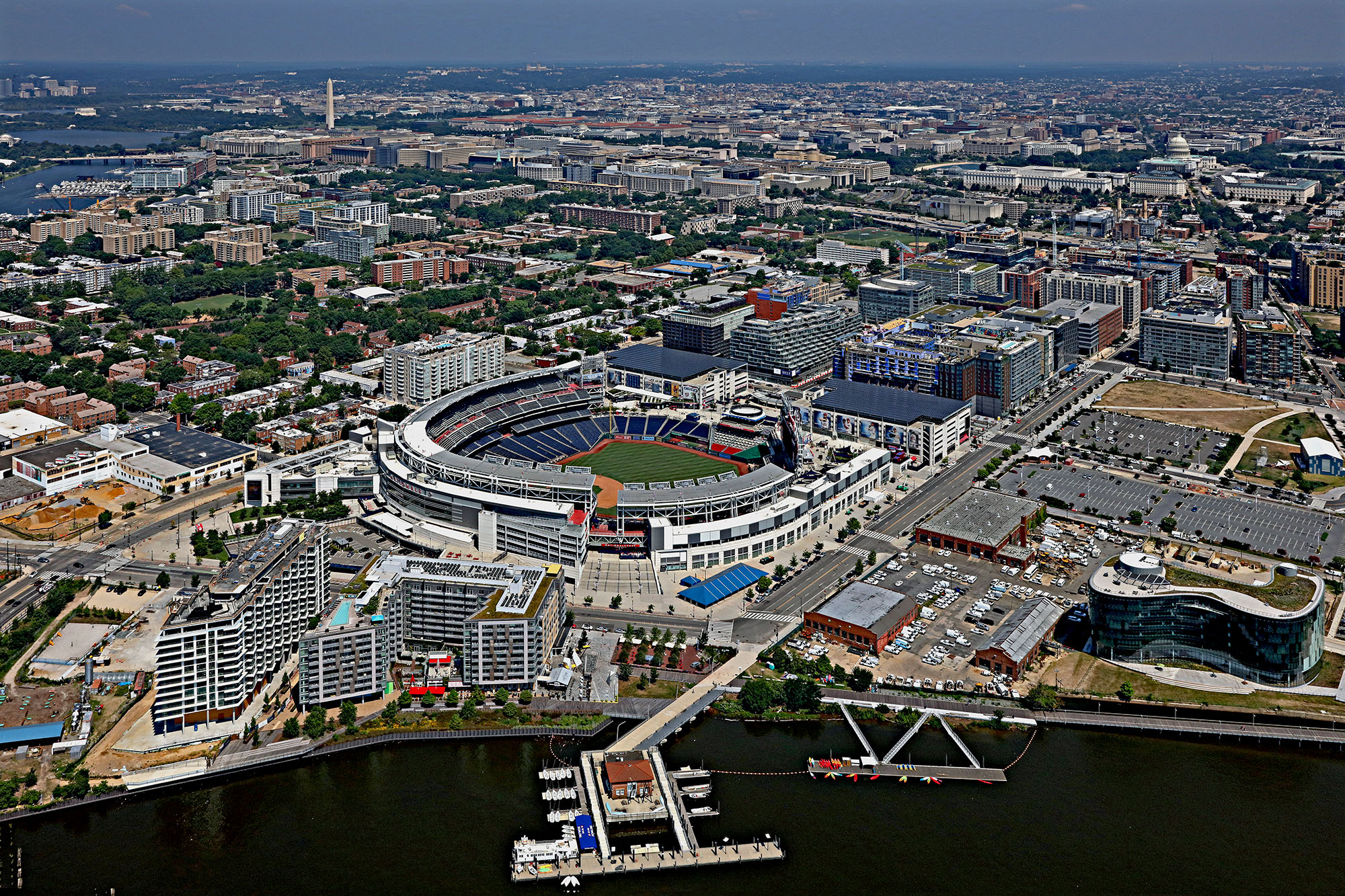
Nationals Park and the Navy Yard neighborhood

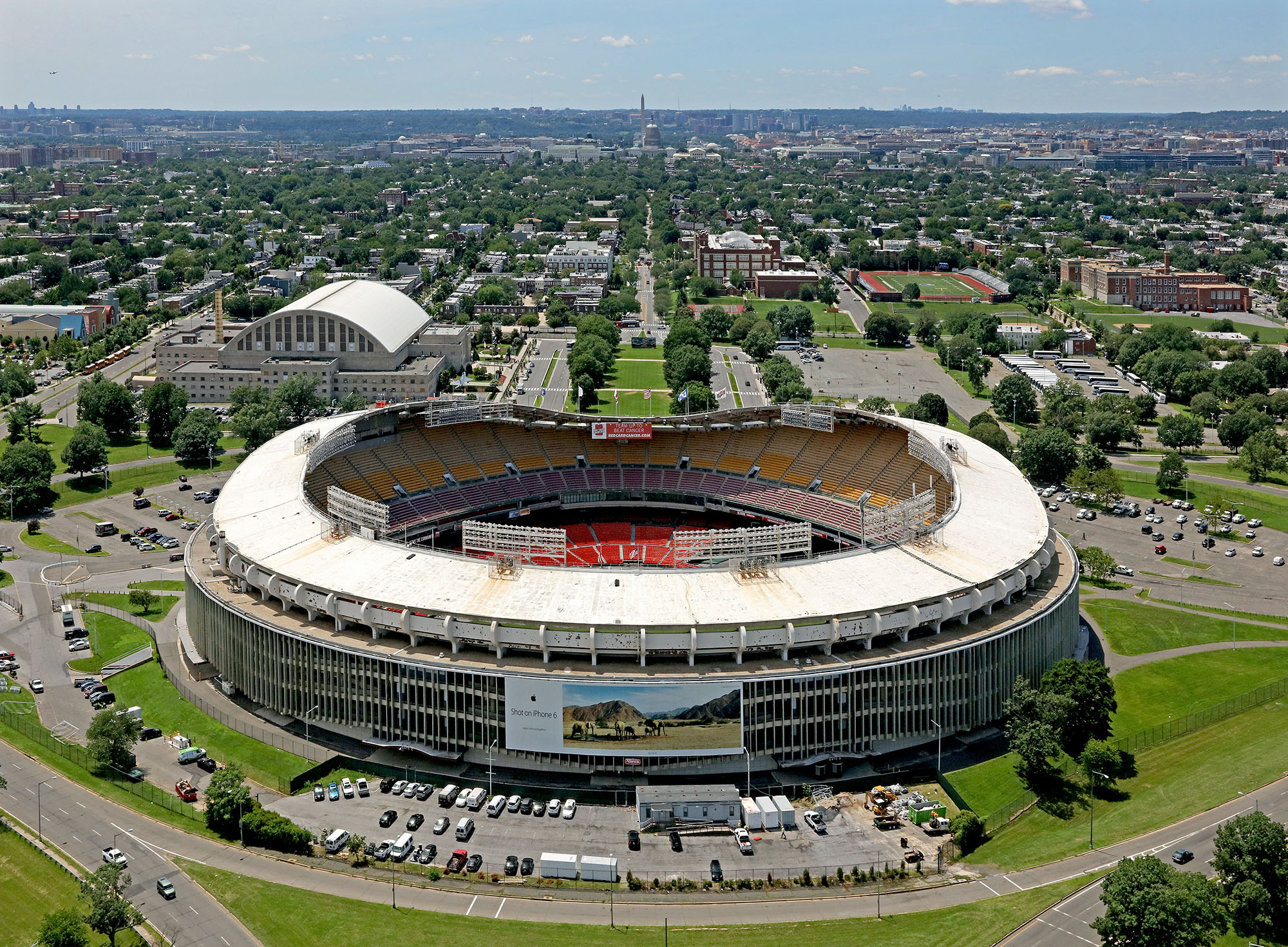
RFK Stadium and the D.C. Armory looking towards the Hill East and Capitol Hill neighborhoods

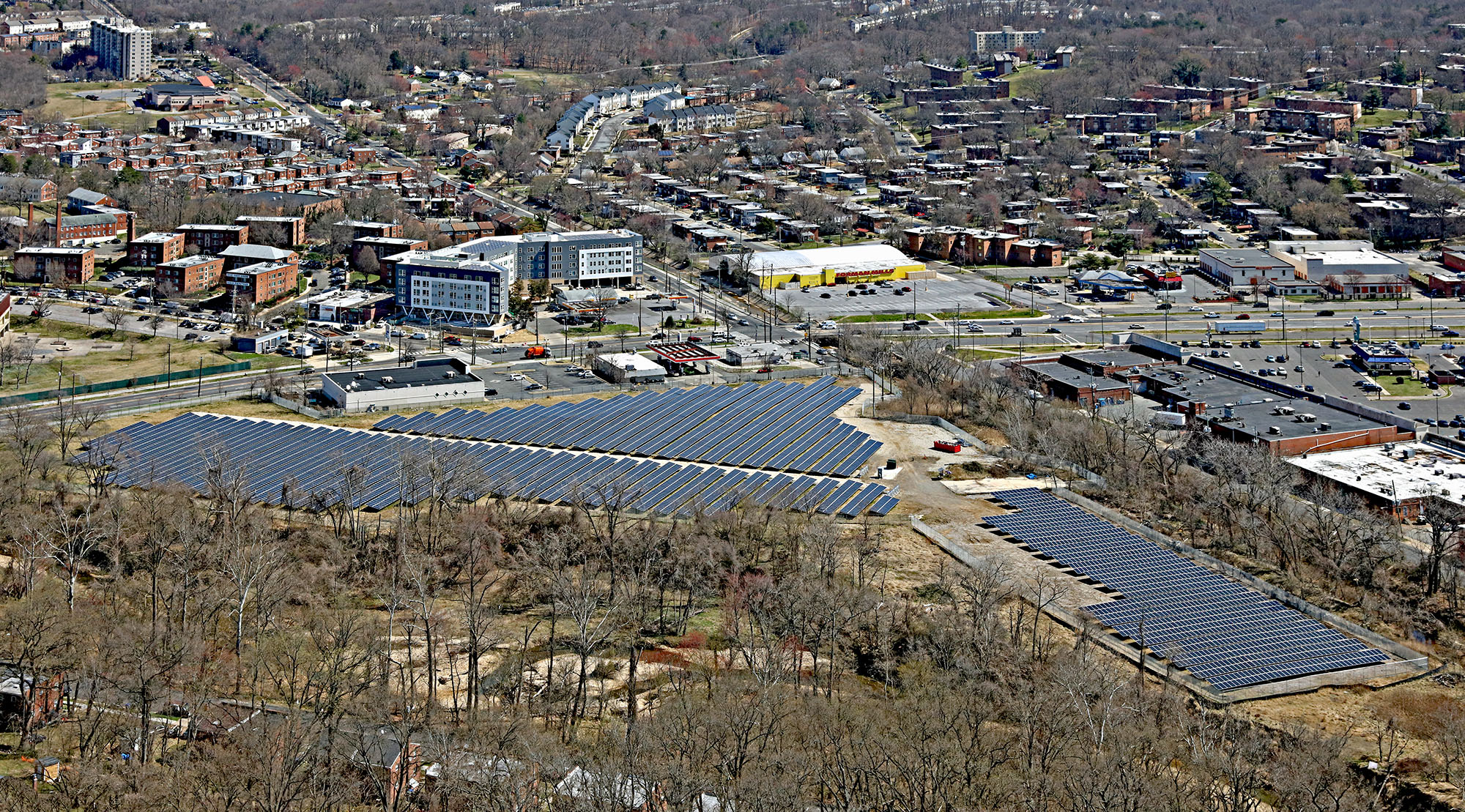
South Capitol St & Solar Panel Farm

== Geography ==
Southeast includes the 32 neighborhoods of:

- Anacostia
- Barry Farm
- Bellevue
- Benning Ridge
- Buena Vista
- Capitol Hill
- Capitol View
- Civic Betterment
- Congress Heights
- Douglass
- Dupont Park
- Fairfax Village
- Fairlawn
- Fort Davis
- Fort Dupont
- Fort Stanton
- Garfield Heights
- Good Hope
- Greenway
- Hill East
- Hillcrest
- Knox Hill
- Marshall Heights
- Navy Yard
- Naylor Gardens
- Penn Branch
- Randle Highlands
- Shipley Terrace
- Skyland
- Twining
- Washington Highland
- Woodland

== Government ==
Politically, Southeast includes most of Ward 8, as well as much of Ward 6 and Ward 7. Marion Barry, the former mayor of Washington, D.C., served as D.C. Council Member for Ward 8 until his death on November 23, 2014.

== Culture ==
Nationals Park, the current ballpark for MLB's Washington Nationals, opened in the Navy Yard neighborhood in March 2008. A $3.8 billion New Stadium at RFK Campus project to house the NFL's Washington Commanders is scheduled to open in the Hill East neighborhood in 2030.

== Transportation ==
Southeast Washington, D.C., is accessible via the Blue, Orange, Green and Silver Lines of the Washington Metro.

== Crime ==
In years past, the quadrant had a high crime rate, relative to the rest of the city.

== Demographics ==
The population of Southeast is predominantly black. However, the African American population is concentrated southeast of the Anacostia River; the areas northwest of the Anacostia River are majority White. The portions of the quadrant southeast of the Anacostia are tree-lined and neighborly. However, shopping, dining, entertainment, and cultural options are limited, so some residents travel either downtown or to the suburbs for such services. There are several black middle class neighborhoods in Southeast, such as Hillcrest, Penn Branch, and Fort Dupont. The areas northwest of the Anacostia contains some of the wealthiest parts of the city, including the southern half of the famous and politically connected Capitol Hill neighborhood. Cultural events/activities include the annual Martin Luther King Jr. Birthday parade, the free weekly summer jazz concerts in Fort Dupont Park, the Fort Dupont ice-rink, the Anacostia Museum of the Smithsonian Institution, the Anacostia Arts Center, and THEARC tennis, arts and learning center for youth on Mississippi Avenue. The population of the southeast quadrant is roughly 226,084.

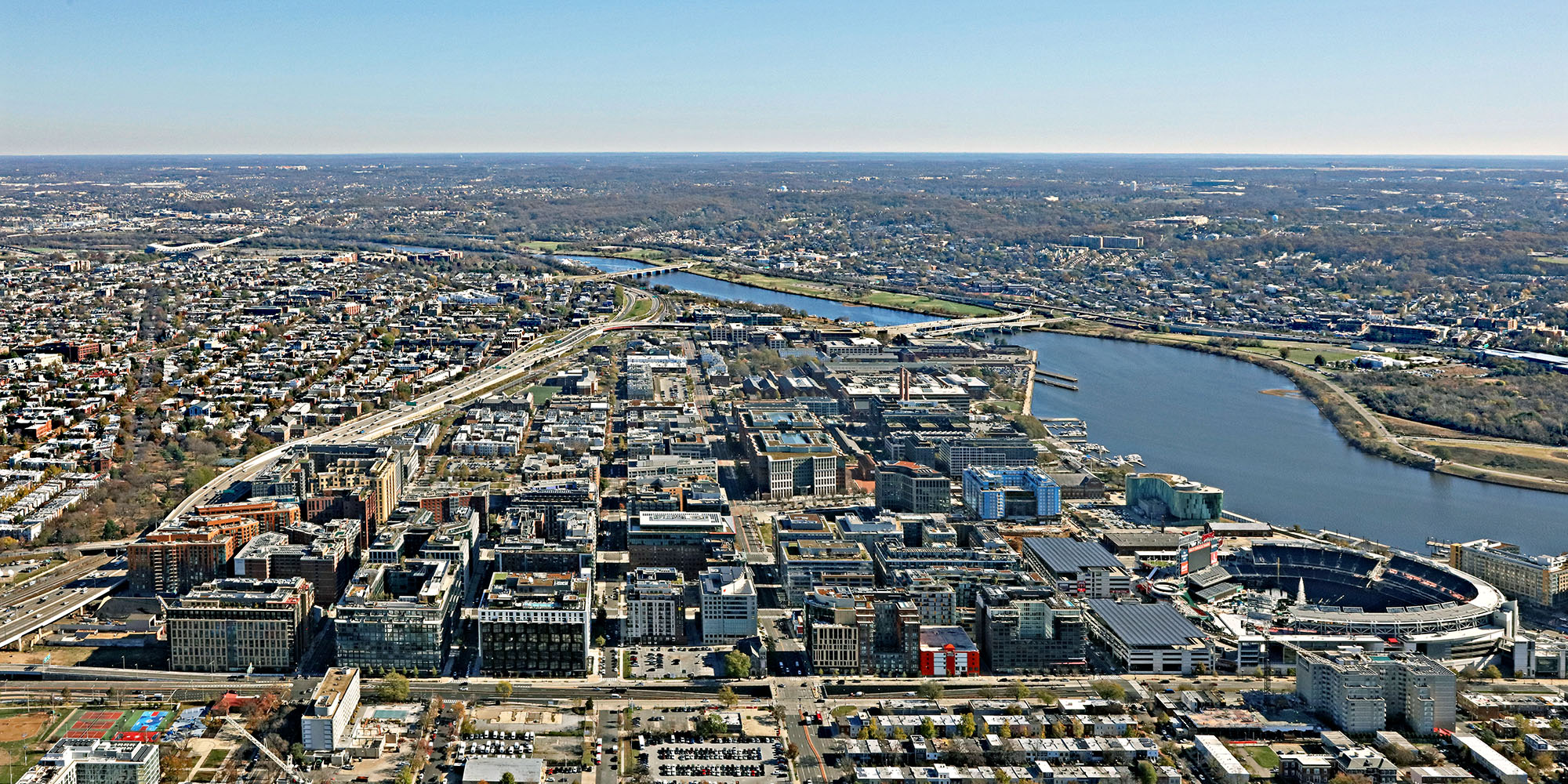
Aerial view looking east

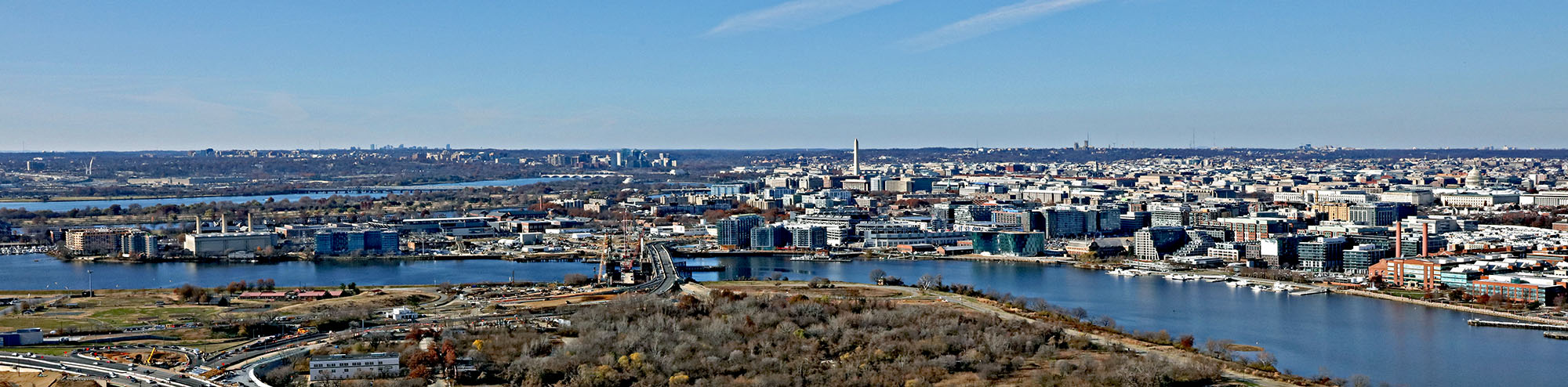
Anacostia River from Buzzard Point to the Navy Yard

== See also ==
- SW—Southwest, Washington, D.C.
- NE—Northeast, Washington, D.C.
- NW—Northwest, Washington, D.C.
