= Shipley Terrace =

Coordinates: 38.843°N 76.98°W

- Neighborhood of Washington, D.C.
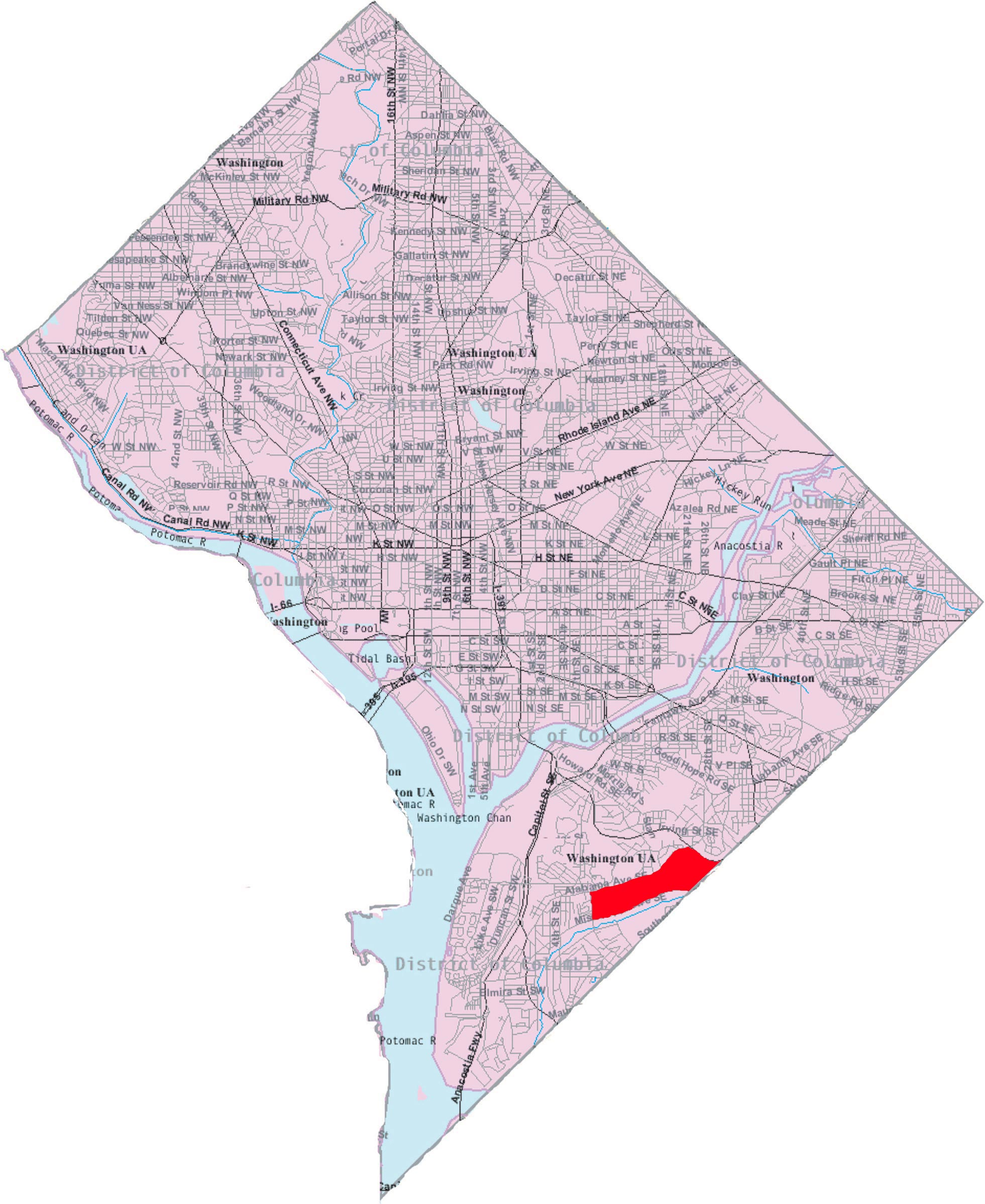
- Map of Washington, D.C., with Shipley Terrace highlighted in red.
- Country: United States
- Territory: District of Columbia
- City: Washington
- Ward: 8

Government
  - Councilmember: Trayon White

Area
  - Total: 1.163 sq mi (3.01 km^{2})

Population
  - Total: 11,528 including Douglass
  - Density: 9,914/sq mi (3,828/km^{2})
- Postal code: 20020
- Area code: 202

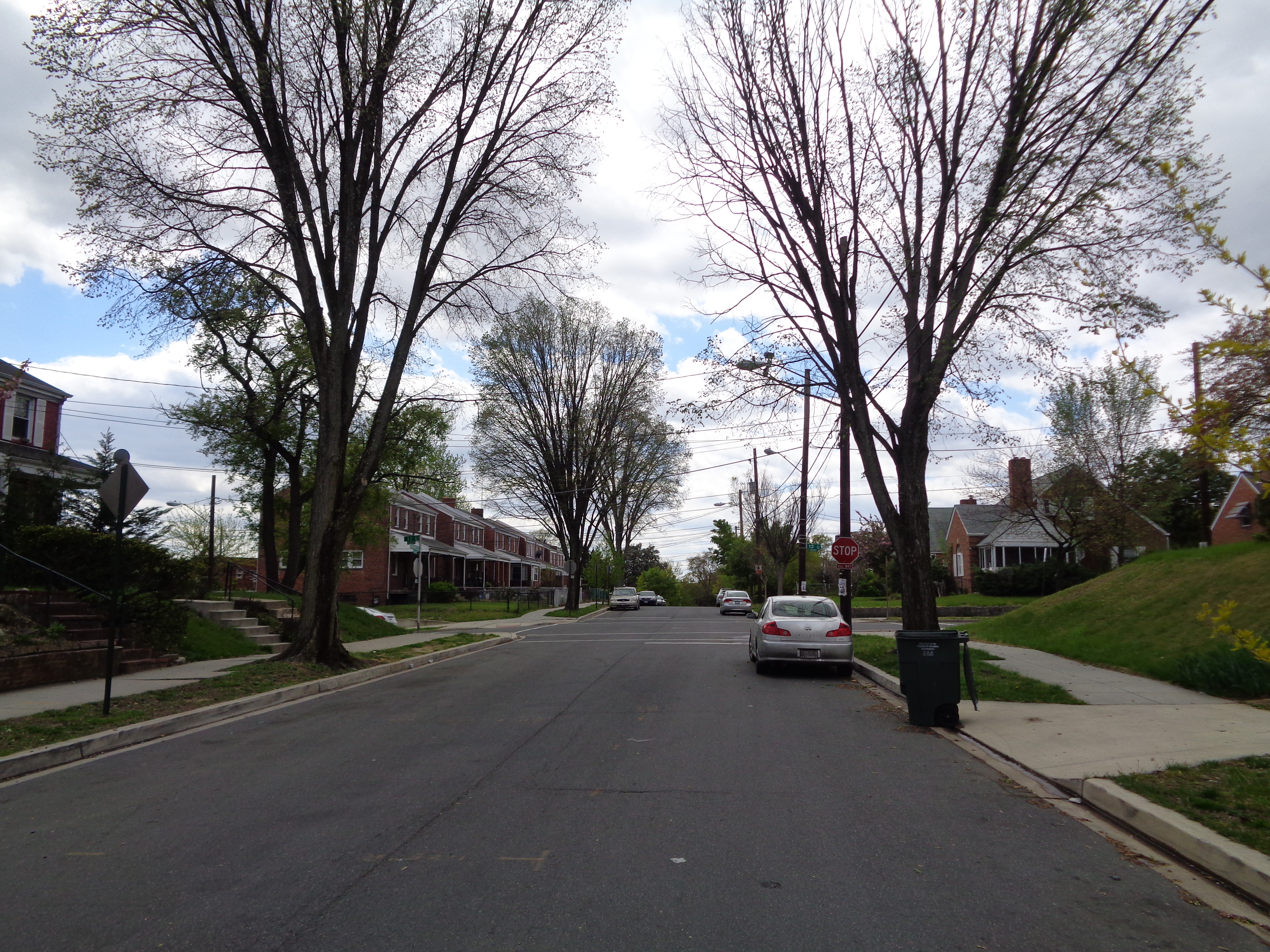
The Shipley Terrace neighborhood at the intersection of 12th and Congress St. SE in April 2018

Shipley Terrace, formerly known as Randle Heights, is a large residential neighborhood in Southeast Washington, D.C., bordering Prince George's County, Maryland. The neighborhood, named after a former public housing complex in the neighborhood, which was largely occupied by low-income housing – primarily walkup and garden unit apartments. This neighborhood now has a mix of townhome communities, large single-family-home communities, as well as some low-income housing. It is a model neighborhood for the Hope VI revitalization Grant Program.

Shipley Terrace is bounded by Wheeler Road SE, Alabama Avenue SE, Mississippi Avenue SE, Valley Terrace SE, Oxon Run National Parkway SE, Southern Avenue SE, and Suitland Parkway SE.
