= Fort Davis Park =

Fort Davis
- Location within District of Columbia
- Location: Washington, D.C.
- Coordinates: 38°52′02″N 76°56′45″W
- Operator: National Park Service
- Website: www.nps.gov/places/fort-davis.htm

Fort Davis is a Civil War earthwork that was constructed for the Defense of Washington. It is located in the Fort Davis (Washington, D.C.) neighborhood.

== History ==
The fort, built to serve as an outer defense of the City of Washington, was named in honor of Benjamin F. Davis, killed at the Battle of Brandy Station.

It was a small hexagonal fort with perimeter of 220 yards, and places for 11 guns. It was 300 feet above mean tide of the Potomac River.

After the war, Daniel Lee's damage claim was denied.
