= Garfield Heights (Washington, D.C.) =

Coordinates: 38.8548°N 76.9722°W

- Neighborhood of Washington, D.C.
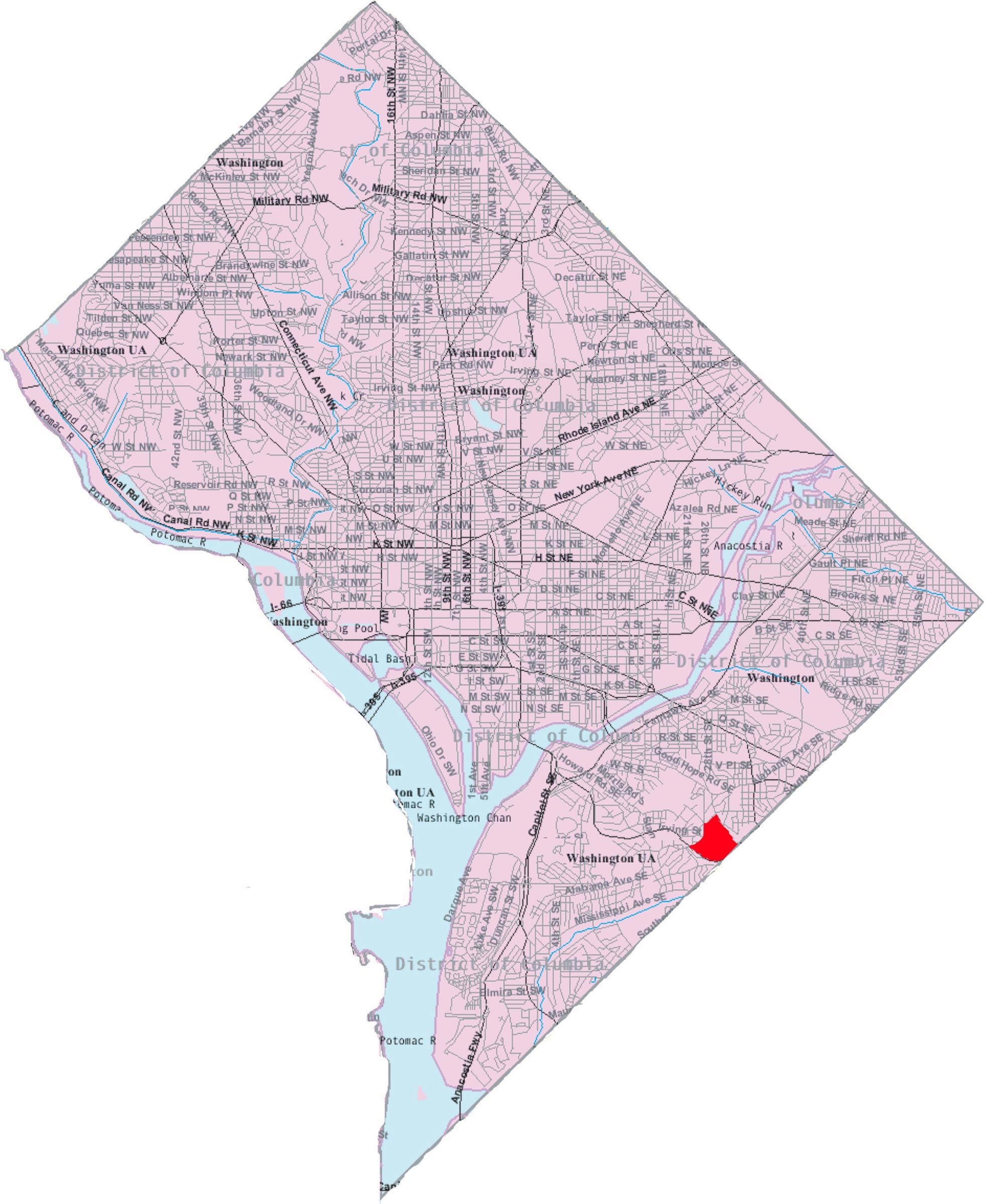
- Garfield Heights within the District of Columbia
- Country: United States
- District: Washington, D.C.
- Ward: Ward 8

Government
  - Council member: Trayon White

Garfield Heights is a residential neighborhood in Southeast Washington, D.C. bounded by Suitland Parkway SE, Alabama Avenue SE, 28th Street SE, Gainesville Street SE, Naylor Road SE, and Southern Avenue SE. It borders Prince George's County, Maryland. Garfield Heights contains both apartment units and single-family detached houses.

Garfield Heights has gone through a wave of physical renovation and an increase in property values since 2006, along with an influx of wealthier residents. Rental apartment buildings throughout the quiet neighborhood have been converted to luxury style condominiums. Recently, Garfield Heights has emerged as one of Southeast's up-and-coming neighborhoods.

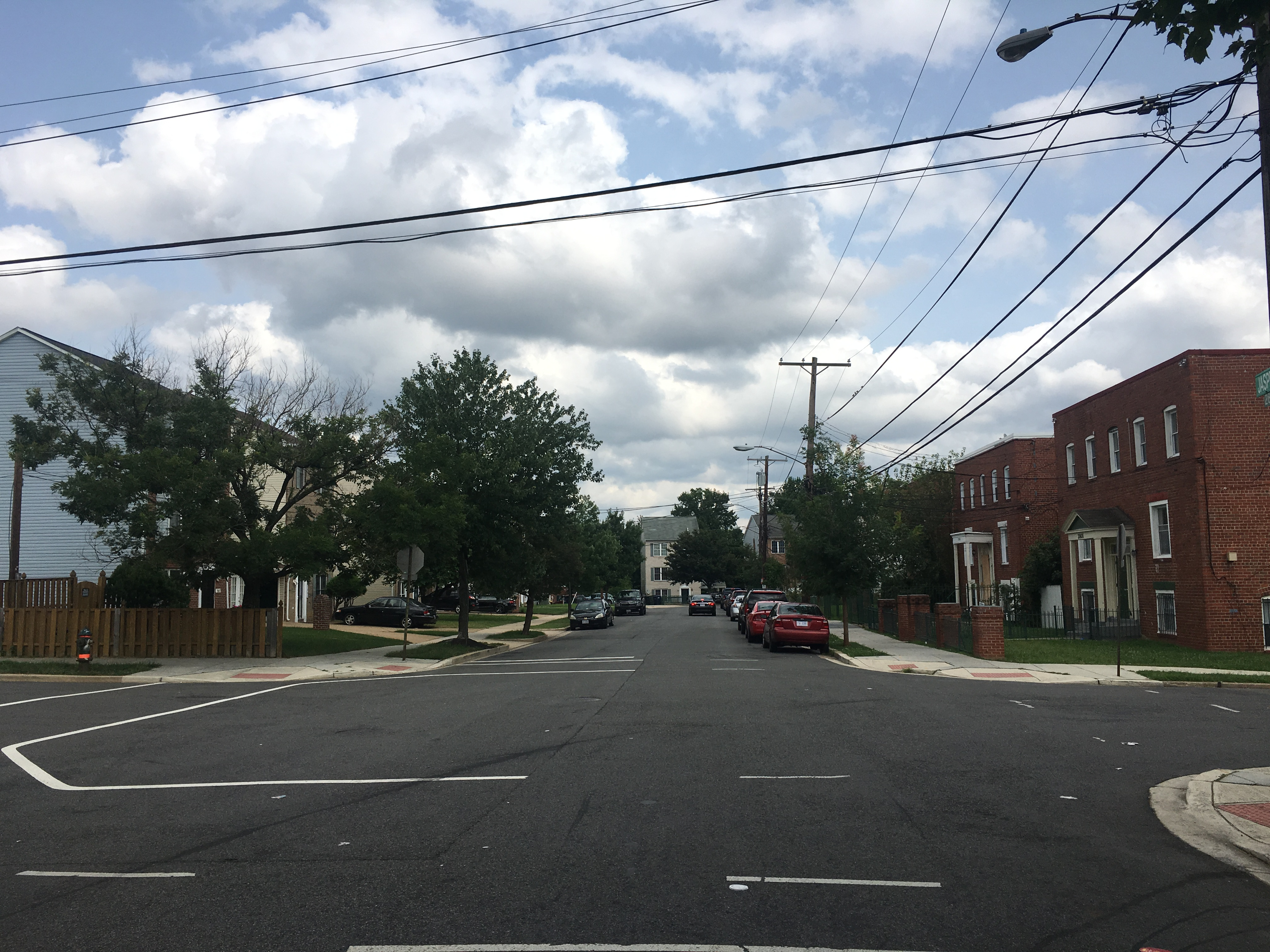
Garfield Heights neighborhood at the intersection of 28th St and Jasper St. SE, August 2018

Garfield Heights is bounded by Alabama Avenue to the west, Suitland Parkway to the southwest, Southern Avenue to the southeast, and Naylor Road to the northeast. It is a short walk from the Anacostia Community Museum. The neighborhood contains the schools Garfield Heights Elementary, Stanton Elementary, Kramer Middle School, Anacostia High School, and Rocketship Rise Academy.
