= Fort Davis (Washington, D.C.) =

- Neighborhood
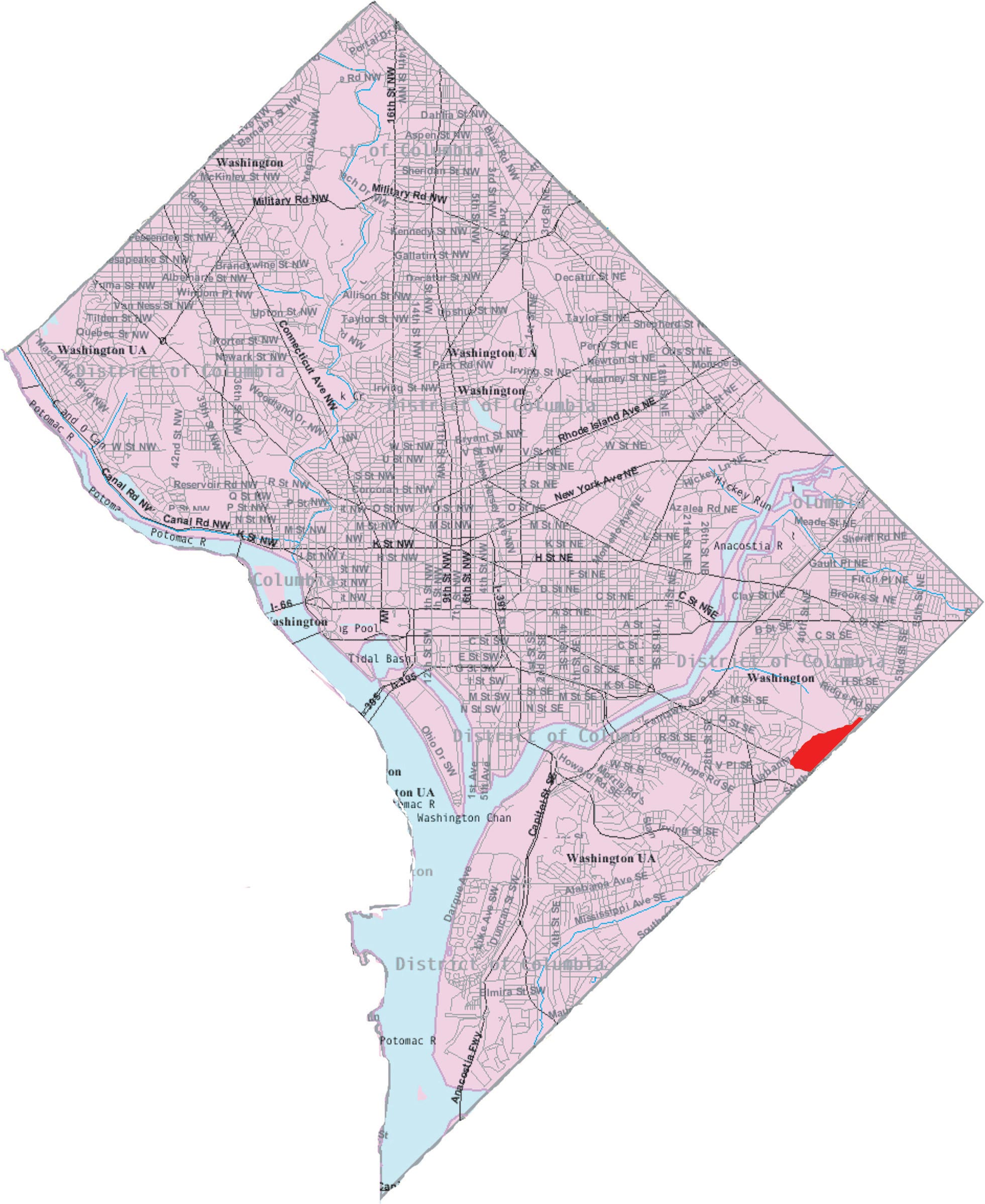
- Map of Washington, D.C., with the Fort Davis neighborhood highlighted in red
- Coordinates: 38°52′2.2044″N 076°56′44.6454″W
- Country: United States
- Territory: Washington, D.C.
- Ward: Ward 7
- Constructed: 1941
- Named for: Fort Davis, an American Civil War-era fort

Government
  - Councilmember: Wendell Felder

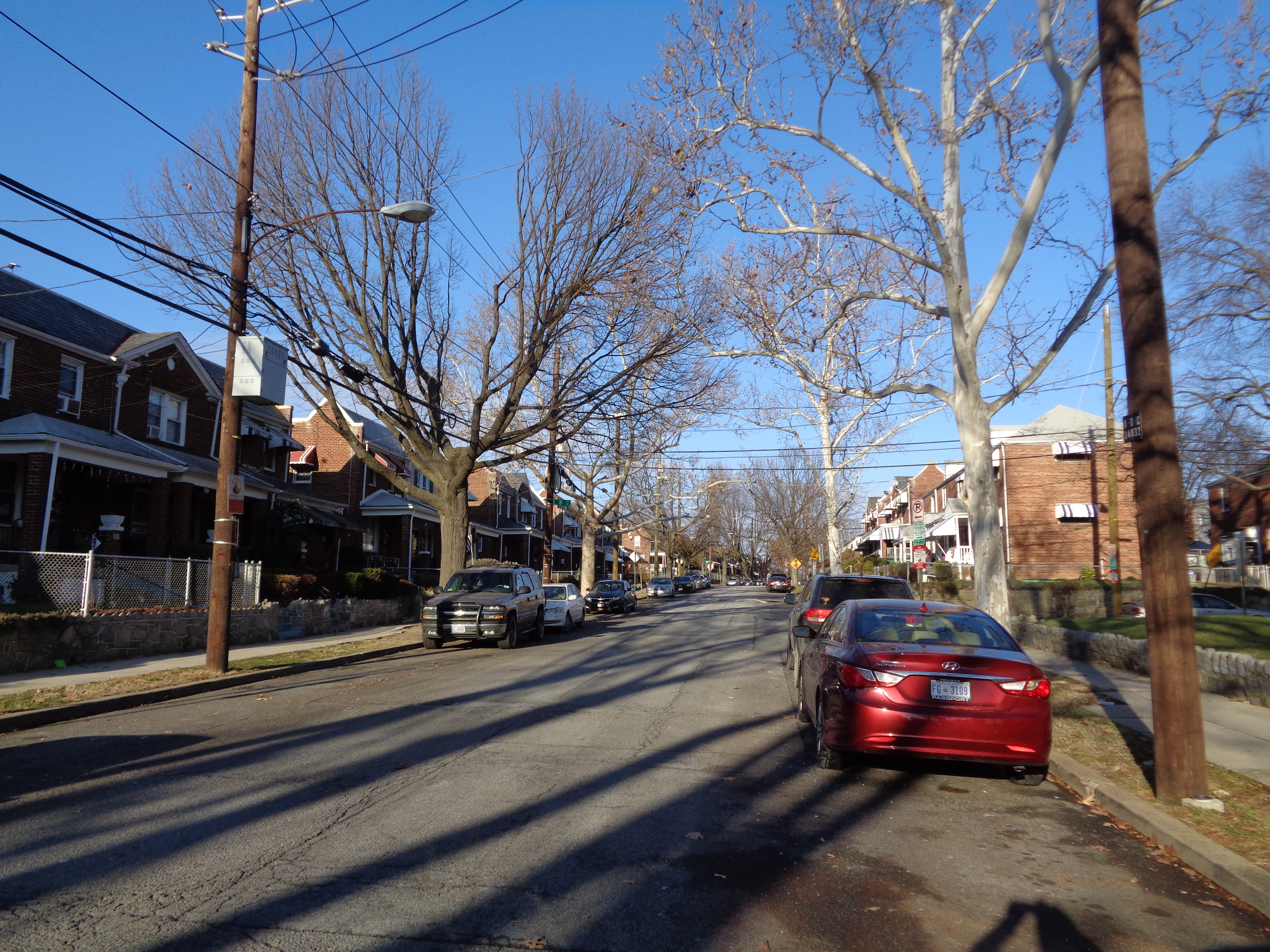
The intersection of Fort Davis St and S St, SE, December 2017

Fort Davis is a residential neighborhood located in southeast Washington, D.C., on the border between the District of Columbia and Maryland. It is bounded by Southern Avenue, Pennsylvania Avenue SE, and Alabama Avenue SE/Bowen Road SE.

Fort Davis Park abuts the western corner of the neighborhood. This park was the site of an American Civil War fort, part of the Defenses of Washington, that gives the neighborhood its name. Fort Dupont Park is adjacent to the neighborhood's northern border on Alabama Avenue SE between Massachusetts Avenue SE and Burns Street SE.

The Fort Davis neighborhood was primarily undeveloped forest until 1941. Max Sugar, a real estate developer, built the first homes in the area in late 1940. The 250 brick detached houses, originally known as "Dupont Village", were bounded by 41st Street SE, 42nd Street SE, Fort Dupont Street SE, and Southern Avenue. Sugar's development was aimed at upper-income defense workers.
