= Fort Dupont =

Neighborhood in Washington, D.C.

Coordinates: 38.887°N 76.9485°W

- Neighborhood of Washington, D.C.
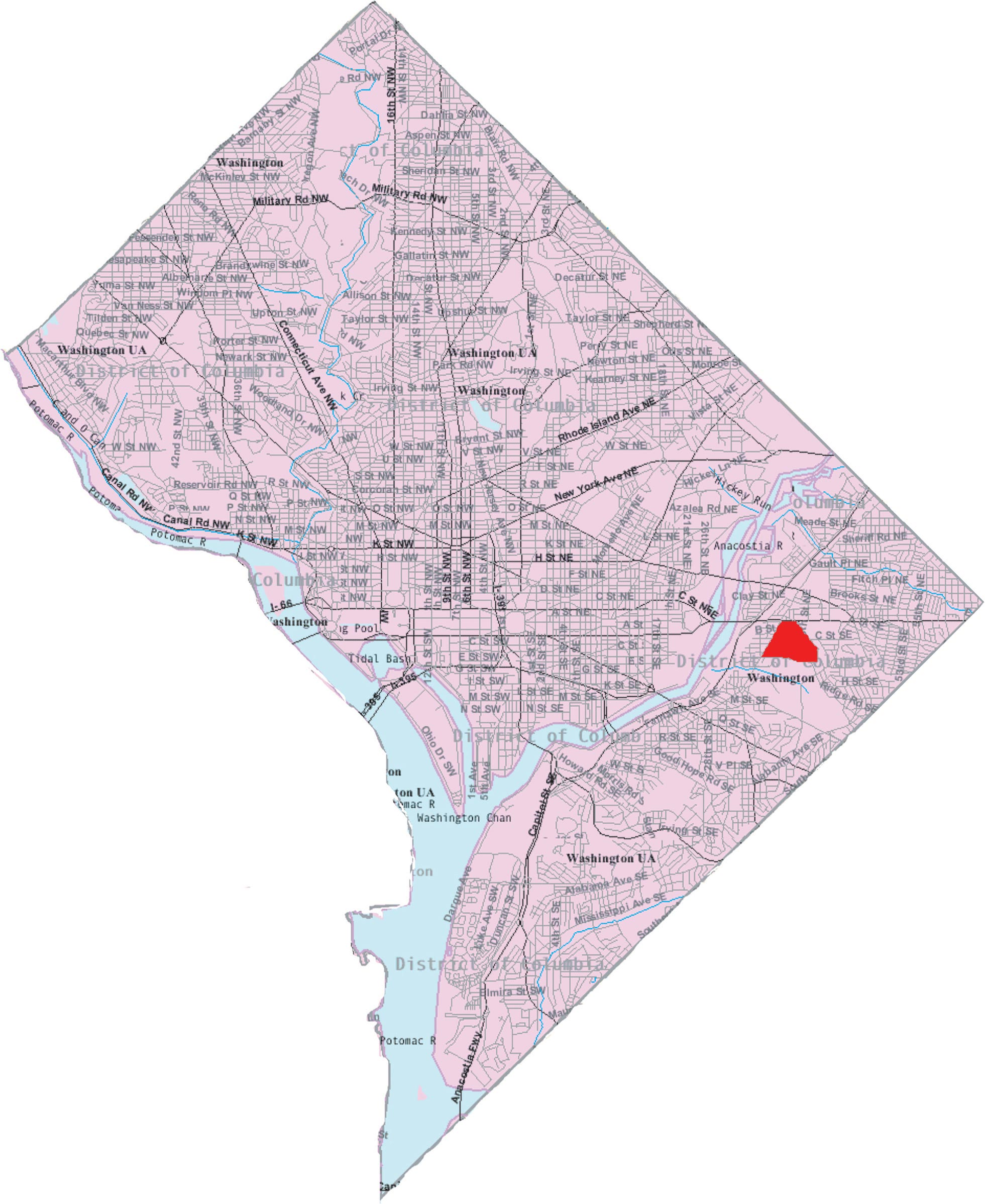
- Fort Dupont within the District of Columbia
- Country: United States
- District: Washington, D.C.
- Ward: Ward 7

Government
  - Councilmember: Wendell Felder

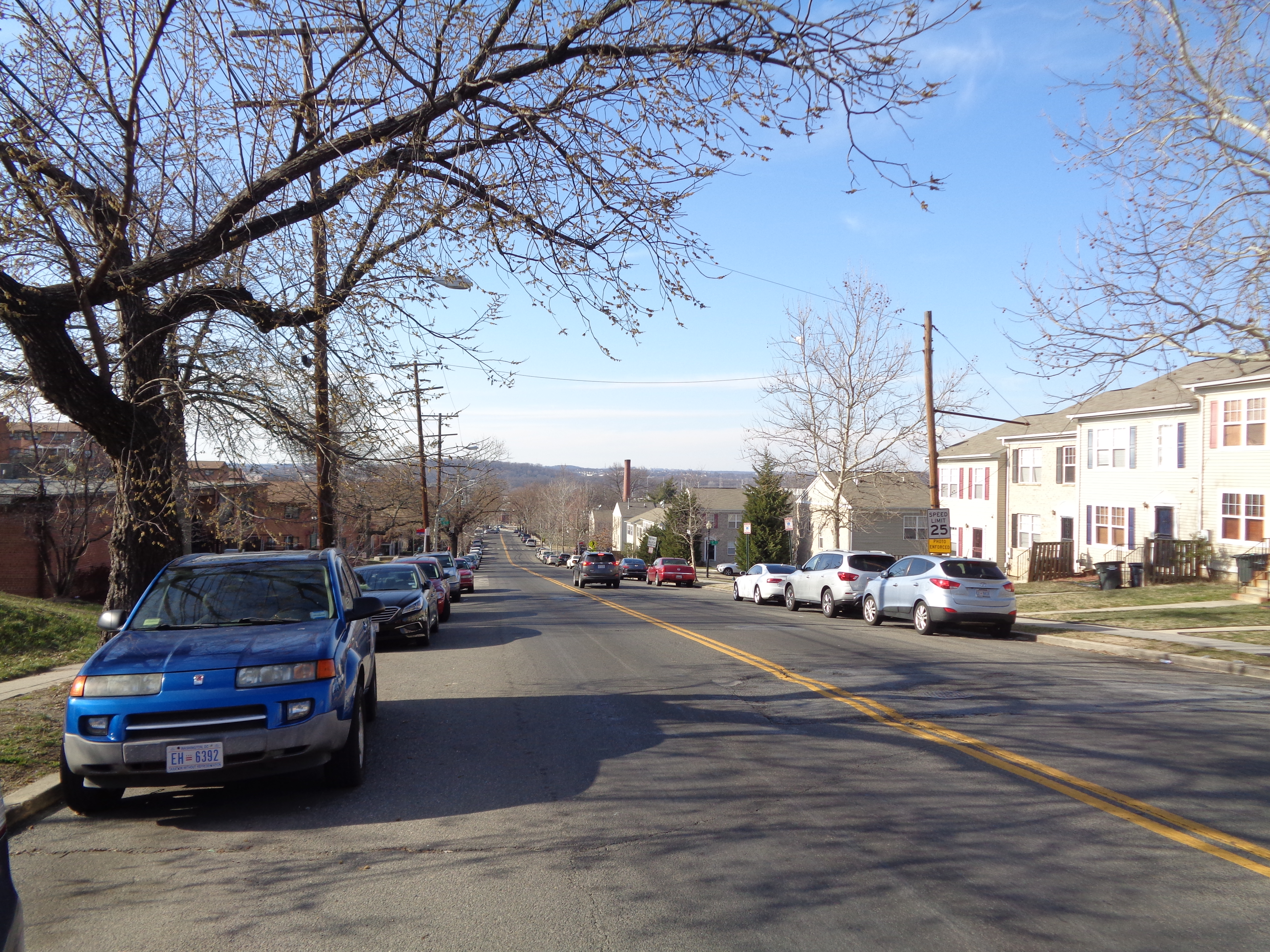
Fort Dupont neighborhood at the intersection of Ridge Road and C St. SE

Fort Dupont is a residential neighborhood located in southeast Washington, D.C., east of the Anacostia River. It is bounded by East Capitol Street to the north, Fort Dupont Park to the south, Minnesota Avenue to the west, and Fort Chaplin Park to the east and northeast. Fort Dupont has a population of approximately 7,050.

Fort Dupont is adjacent to Fort Dupont Park, the grounds of a Civil War-era fort that was constructed for the defense of Washington. Fort Dupont is a distinct neighborhood from the nearby Dupont Park, although both border the park and take their names from it.

== See also ==
- List of World War II military service football teams
