= Wendell Felder =

American politician (born 1990)

- Felder in 2025

Member of the Council of the District of Columbia from Ward 7
- Incumbent
- Assumed office January 2, 2025
- Preceded by: Vincent Gray

Personal details
- Born: 1990 (age 35–36) Washington, D.C., U.S.
- Party: Democratic
- Education: Bowie State University (BS); Georgetown University (MA)

Wendell Felder (born 1990) is an American politician from Washington, D.C. Felder, a member of the Democratic Party, serves on the Council of the District of Columbia, representing Ward 7.

== Early life ==
Felder is a fourth-generation Washingtonian who grew up in Southeast D.C. and attended McKinley Technology High School. Felder went on to receive a B.S. from Bowie State University and a M.A. from Georgetown University.

== Career ==
Felder commenced his career in public service in the D.C. Office of Community Relations and Services, where he served as a constituent services representative. Felder later served as the special assistant and deputy chief of staff to former city administrator Rashad Young, and eventually as a community development manager with the city government, overseeing multiple economic development projects in areas along the Anacostia River. After departing public service, Felder worked at Sibley Memorial Hospital as its director of community affairs and at Howard University.

Felder ran for ANC Commissioner in 2016. He previously served as the Chair of ANC 7D.

== Council of the District of Columbia ==
=== 2024 election ===
Felder launched his bid for the Ward 7 seat on the city council in December 2023, shortly after longtime incumbent and former mayor Vincent C. Gray announced he would be retiring from local politics. Felder won the endorsement of Gray just weeks before the June primary, besting the other nine Democratic candidates vying Gray's seal of approval. Felder also garnered the endorsements of councilpersons Brooke Pinto, Zachary Parker, and Trayon White alongside The Washington Post. Felder eventually kept a 3.5% lead over the more-progressive Payne, who fell behind by a mere 400 votes.

== Personal life ==
Felder lives in the Mayfair section of Northeast D.C.
