= National Register of Historic Places listings in Southeast Quadrant, Washington, D.C. =

This is a list of properties and districts in the Southeast quadrant of Washington, D.C. that are listed on the National Register of Historic Places.

== Current listings ==
	Name on the Register	Image	Date listed	Location	Neighborhood	Description
1	Anacostia Historic District	Anacostia Historic District	October 11, 1978 (#78003050)	Roughly bounded by Martin Luther King, Jr. Avenue; Good Hope Road; 16th Street; Fendall Street; V Street; 15th Street and the Frederick Douglass National Historic Site; Maple View Place; 38°51′53″N 76°59′08″W	Anacostia	Comprises approximately 20 squares and about 550 buildings built between 1854 and 1930
2	Capitol Hill Historic District	Capitol Hill Historic District	August 27, 1976 (#76002127)	Roughly bounded by Virginia Ave., SE., S. Capitol St., F St. NE., and 14th Sts. SE & NE.; also roughly bounded by 7th St. NE, I-295, M St. SE and 11th St. SE; 38°53′13″N 76°59′51″W	Capitol Hill	Second set of boundaries represents a boundary increase of July 3, 2003
3	Capitol Power Plant Pump House	Capitol Power Plant Pump House	May 27, 2026 (#100013048)	1520 First Street SE; 38°52′16″N 77°00′21″W		
4	Christ Church	Christ Church	May 25, 1969 (#69000291)	620 G St., SE. 38°52′53″N 76°59′52″W	Capitol Hill	
5	Civil War Fort Sites	Civil War Fort Sites	July 15, 1974 (#74000274)	Arc of sites surrounding central Washington in Maryland, Virginia, and D.C. 38°52′00″N 76°57′06″W	All quadrants	At the outset of the Civil War in 1861, Washington became a critical target for rebel attacks but was virtually without protection. The Union Army hastily began construction of a fortified defense line around the city, the physical remnants of which encompass these 19 earthwork forts, including Fort Chaplin, Fort Dupont, Fort Davis, Battery Ricketts, Fort Stanton, and Fort Carroll. See also National Register listings in central D.C., western NW D.C., upper NW D.C., NE D.C., Prince George's County, Maryland, and Fairfax County, Virginia.
6	Civil War Monuments in Washington, DC	Civil War Monuments in Washington, DC	September 20, 1978 (#78000257)	Various parks within the original boundaries of city 38°53′23″N 76°59′25″W	Various	18 statues about people and topics related to the Civil War, including 1 in Lincoln Park (NE & SE quadrants), 6 in the upper NW quadrant, and 11 in central Washington.
7	Commandant's Office, Washington Navy Yard	Commandant's Office, Washington Navy Yard	August 14, 1973 (#73002077)	Montgomery Sq. and Dahlgren Ave., SE. 38°52′23″N 76°59′43″W	Navy Yard	
8	Congressional Cemetery	Congressional Cemetery	June 23, 1969 (#69000292)	1801 E St., SE. 38°52′52″N 76°58′38″W	Hill East	Designated a National Historic Landmark June 14, 2011
9	Frederick Douglass National Historic Site	Frederick Douglass National Historic Site	October 15, 1966 (#66000033)	1411 W St., SE. 38°51′45″N 76°59′04″W	Anacostia	Boundary increase approved December 30, 2022.
10	Duvall Manor Apartments	Duvall Manor Apartments	June 1, 2018 (#100002480)	3500-3510 Minnesota Ave SE. 38°53′11″N 76°57′20″W	Greenway	
11	Eastern Market	Eastern Market	May 27, 1971 (#71000998)	7th and C Sts., SE. 38°53′11″N 76°59′48″W	Capitol Hill	Badly damaged by an early-morning fire on April 30, 2007; reopened on June 26, 2009
12	East Corner Boundary Marker of the Original District of Columbia	East Corner Boundary Marker of the Original District of Columbia	November 1, 1996 (#96001249)	100 feet east of the junction of Eastern and Southern Aves. 38°53′35″N 76°54′34″W	NE and SE	See List of Boundary Markers of the Original District of Columbia
13	Engine Company No. 19	Engine Company No. 19	May 10, 2010 (#10000238)	2813 Pennsylvania Ave., SE; 38°52′18″N 76°58′01″W	Randle Highlands	
14	Engine Company No. 25	Engine Company No. 25	June 27, 2007 (#07000593)	3203 Martin Luther King Jr., Ave SE; 38°50′35″N 77°00′03″W	Congress Heights	
15	Folger Shakespeare Library	Folger Shakespeare Library	June 23, 1969 (#69000294)	201 E. Capitol St., SE. 38°53′22″N 77°00′11″W	Capitol Hill	
16	Friendship House-The Maples	Friendship House-The Maples	January 18, 1973 (#73002086)	619 D St., SE., or 630 South Carolina Ave., SE. 38°53′02″N 76°59′53″W	Capitol Hill	
17	The Furies Collective	The Furies Collective	May 2, 2016 (#16000211)	219 11th St., SE; 38°53′13″N 76°59′29″W	Capitol Hill	Designated a National Historic Landmark December 13, 2024.
18	Gallinger Municipal Hospital Psychopathic Ward	Gallinger Municipal Hospital Psychopathic Ward	February 27, 1989 (#89000074)	Reservation 13, 19th St. and Massachusetts Ave., SE; 38°53′04″N 76°58′37″W	Hill East	A part of the former DC General Hospital
19	Latrobe Gate	Latrobe Gate	August 14, 1973 (#73002098)	8th and M Sts., SE. 38°52′35″N 76°59′43″W	Navy Yard	
20	Main Sewerage Pumping Station, District of Columbia	Main Sewerage Pumping Station, District of Columbia	May 24, 2012 (#12000297)	125 O St., SE; 38°52′26″N 77°00′12″W	Navy Yard	
21	Old Naval Hospital	Old Naval Hospital	May 3, 1974 (#74002171)	921 Pennsylvania Ave., SE. 38°52′58″N 76°59′36″W	Capitol Hill	
22	Quarters A, Washington Navy Yard	Quarters A, Washington Navy Yard	August 14, 1973 (#73002111)	East of the main gate and south of M St., SE., in the navy yard 38°52′34″N 76°59′41″W	Navy Yard	
23	Quarters B, Washington Navy Yard	Quarters B, Washington Navy Yard	August 14, 1973 (#73002112)	Charles Morris Ave., SE. 38°52′32″N 76°59′39″W	Navy Yard	
24	Randle Highlands School	Randle Highlands School	May 12, 2025 (#100011795)	1650 Thirtieth Street, SE; 38°52′13″N 76°57′53″W	SE	
25	St. Elizabeths Hospital	St. Elizabeths Hospital	April 26, 1979 (#79003101)	1100 Alabama Ave., SE. 38°51′01″N 76°59′40″W	SE	
26	St. Mark's Church	St. Mark's Church	May 8, 1973 (#73002117)	3rd and A Sts., SE. 38°53′18″N 77°00′06″W	Capitol Hill	
27	Saint Paul African Union Methodist Church	Saint Paul African Union Methodist Church	July 28, 2011 (#11000481)	401 I St., SE. 38°52′45″N 77°00′02″W	Navy Yard	
28	Seafarers Boat Club	Seafarers Boat Club	May 2, 2022 (#100007666)	1950 M St. SE; 38°52′44″N 76°58′29″W	Hill East	
29	John Philip Sousa Junior High School	John Philip Sousa Junior High School	August 7, 2001 (#01001045)	3650 Ely Place, SE. 38°53′01″N 76°57′08″W	Fort Dupont	In 1950, eleven African American students were denied admission to the newly constructed all-white Sousa school. This action was eventually overturned in the landmark 1954 Supreme Court decision in Bolling v. Sharpe, which made segregated public schools illegal in the District of Columbia. The defeat of the legal doctrine "separate but equal" was a significant landmark in the modern Civil Rights Movement.
30	Southeast Branch Library	Southeast Branch Library	June 14, 2021 (#100006651)	403 7th St. SE; 38°53′03″N 76°59′47″W	Capitol Hill	
31	Southeast No. 1 Boundary Marker of the Original District of Columbia	Southeast No. 1 Boundary Marker of the Original District of Columbia	November 1, 1996 (#96001248)	30 feet south of the junction of Southern Ave. and D St., SE; 38°52′58″N 76°55′20″W	Marshall Heights	
32	Southeast No. 2 Boundary Marker of the Original District of Columbia	Southeast No. 2 Boundary Marker of the Original District of Columbia	November 1, 1996 (#96001247)	4345 Southern Ave. 38°52′20″N 76°56′09″W	Fort Davis	
33	Southeast No. 3 Boundary Marker of the Original District of Columbia	Southeast No. 3 Boundary Marker of the Original District of Columbia	November 1, 1996 (#96001246)	3908 Southern Ave. 38°51′43″N 76°56′55″W	Fairfax Village	
34	Southeast No. 5 Boundary Marker of the Original District of Columbia	Southeast No. 5 Boundary Marker of the Original District of Columbia	November 1, 1996 (#96001245)	280 feet northeast of the junction of Southern Ave. and Valley Terrace; 38°50′31″N 76°58′29″W	Shipley Terrace	
35	Southeast No. 6 Boundary Marker of the Original District of Columbia	Southeast No. 6 Boundary Marker of the Original District of Columbia	November 1, 1996 (#96001244)	901 Southern Ave. 38°49′54″N 76°59′17″W	Washington Highlands	
36	Southeast No. 7 Boundary Marker of the Original District of Columbia	Southeast No. 7 Boundary Marker of the Original District of Columbia	November 1, 1996 (#96001243)	25 feet northeast of the junction of Southern Ave. and Indian Head Rd. 38°49′17″N 77°00′05″W	Bellevue	
37	U.S. Marine Corps Barracks and Commandant's House	U.S. Marine Corps Barracks and Commandant's House	December 27, 1972 (#72001435)	8th and I Sts., SE; 38°52′48″N 76°59′41″W	Capitol Hill	
38	Suitland Parkway	Suitland Parkway	June 2, 1995 (#95000604)	From the Anacostia River in the District of Columbia to Pennsylvania Ave. in Prince George's County, Maryland; 38°51′12″N 76°59′00″W	Various	
39	Texas Gardens Apartments	Texas Gardens Apartments	June 1, 2018 (#100002481)	1741 28th St SE; 38°52′04″N 76°58′04″W	Randle Highlands	
40	Washington and Georgetown Railroad Car House	Washington and Georgetown Railroad Car House	November 14, 2006 (#06000516)	770 M St. SE; 38°52′44″N 76°59′45″W	Navy Yard	Commonly known as the Blue Castle
41	Washington Navy Yard	Washington Navy Yard	June 19, 1973 (#73002124)	8th and M Sts., SE, also 200 Tingey St. SE; 38°52′25″N 76°59′47″W	Navy Yard	Boundary increase approved June 29, 2023.
42	Washington Yacht Club	Washington Yacht Club	October 2, 2020 (#100005305)	1500 M St. SE. 38°52′33″N 76°59′09″W	Hill East	
43	Watterston House	Watterston House	January 17, 1992 (#91001942)	224 2nd St., SE. 38°53′11″N 77°00′13″W	Capitol Hill	
44	Woodlawn Cemetery	Woodlawn Cemetery	December 20, 1996 (#96001499)	4611 Benning Rd., SE; 38°53′06″N 76°56′19″W	Benning Ridge	
