= Officers' Row =

Officers' Row or Officers Row is a feature of many forts and other military installations, especially those of the United States, including:

- Officers Row at Fort Egbert, Eagle, Alaska
- Officers row at Fort DuPont, Delaware City, Delaware
- Officers' Row at Fort Larned, Larned, Kansas
- Officers' Row at Fort Williams, Cape Elizabeth, Maine
- Officers Row at Fort Wayne, Detroit, Michigan
- Officers Row at Fort Brady, Sault Sainte Marie, Michigan
- Officers' Row at Jefferson Barracks, St. Louis, Missouri
- Officers' Row at Fort Hancock, Middletown Township, New Jersey
- Officers' Row at Plattsburgh Air Force Base, Plattsburgh, New York
- Officers' Row at Fort Wadsworth, now part of Gateway National Recreation Area, Staten Island, New York
- Officers' Row at Fort Stotsenburg, Angeles City, Philippines
- Officers' Row at Fort Concho, San Angelo, Texas
- Officers' Row Quarters at Fort Clark, Brackettville, Texas
- Officers Row at Fort McIntosh, Laredo, Texas
- Officers Row at Fort Ethan Allen, Colchester and Essex, Vermont
- Officers' Row Historic District, Bremerton, Washington
- Officers' Row at Fort Worden, Port Townsend, Washington
- Officers Row, Fort Vancouver Barracks, Vancouver, Washington
- Officers' row at Fort Yellowstone, Yellowstone National Park, Wyoming

== See also ==
- Fortification
- Officer (military)
- Officer's Quarters
