= Texas Gardens Apartments =

Historic apartment building in Washington, D.C.

- U.S. National Register of Historic Places
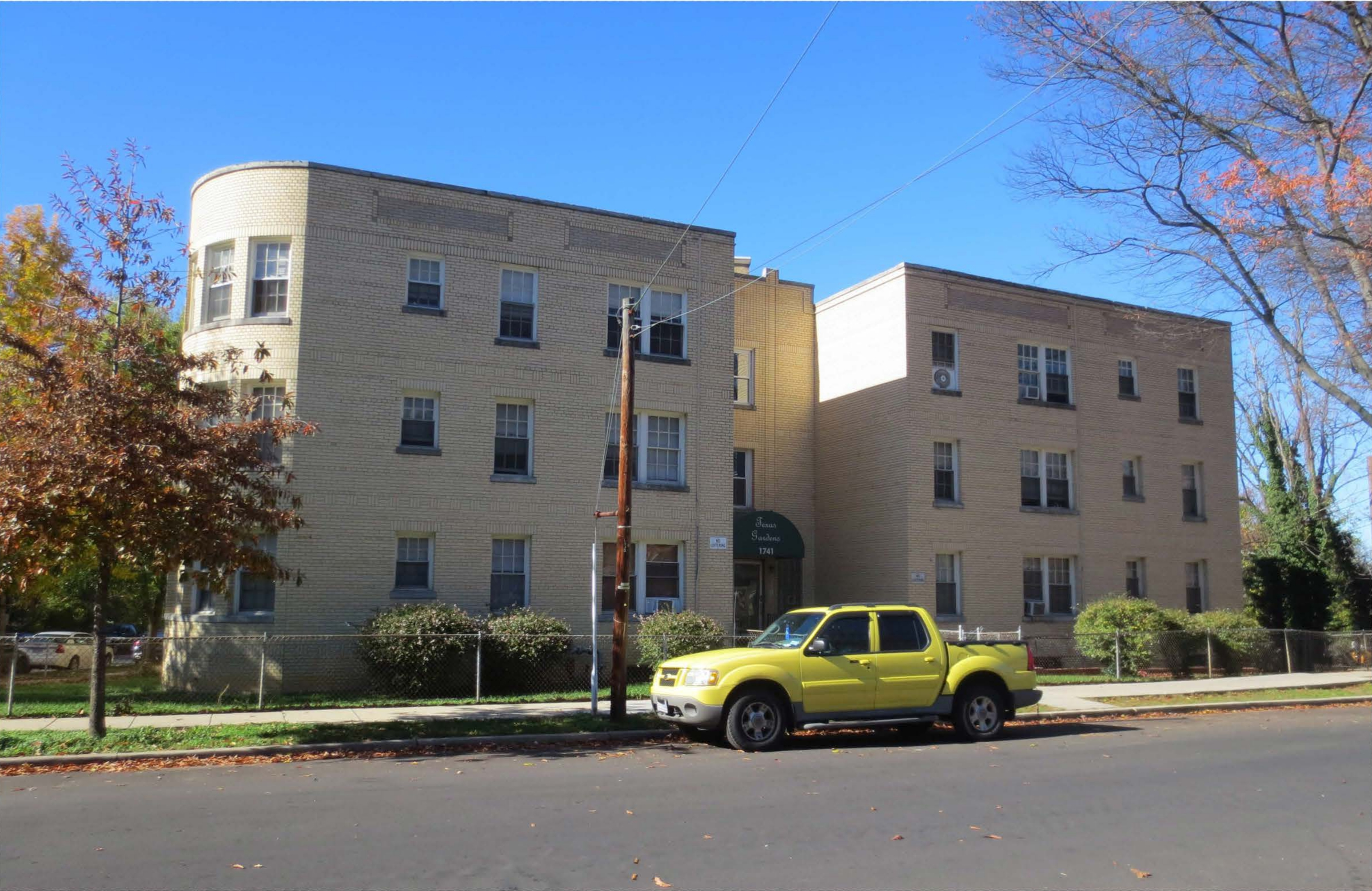

- Location within Washington, D.C.
- Location: 1741 28th Street SE, Washington, D.C.
- Coordinates: 38.867992°N 76.968248°W
- Built: 1943–1944
- Built by: Abe Feinstein
- Architect: Charles E. Marzadro
- Architectural style: Art Deco
- NRHP reference No.: 100002481
- Added to NRHP: June 1, 2018

Texas Gardens Apartments is a historic apartment building in the Randle Highlands neighborhood of southeast Washington, D.C. The building, located at 1741 28th Street SE, was constructed from 1943 to 1944 and was designed in the Art Deco style by Charles E. Marzadro for owner and builder Abe Feinstein.

The building was listed on the National Register of Historic Places on June 1, 2018. It was listed for its association with apartment-house development in Washington during World War II and as an example of a conventional low-rise apartment building with Art Deco design features.

== Description ==
Texas Gardens Apartments is a three-story brick and concrete apartment building on a 0.5-acre site at 28th Street SE and Texas Avenue SE. The building has a raised basement, a flat roof and a compound plan. Its main block is oriented parallel to Texas Avenue, with projections extending from the east side of the building toward 28th Street SE.

The building's exterior is faced in six-course common-bond brick masonry. Character-defining features include a rounded southeast corner, glass-block panels flanking the main entrance, patterned brickwork, vertical brick piers at the entrance bay and decorative masonry panels. The 28th Street elevation contains the main entrance, while another entrance faces Texas Avenue.

The interior retains several historic features in its public spaces. The stairwells include terrazzo flooring, plaster walls and iron railings. The first-floor lobby includes terrazzo flooring with a seven-point star design, coved crown molding and plaster arches. At the time of the National Register nomination, the building contained 49 apartments, including studio, one-bedroom and two-bedroom units.

== History ==
The site is in the Randle Highlands subdivision, which developed from the East Washington Heights subdivision. The land was first subdivided in 1891, and Arthur Randle later purchased a large portion of East Washington Heights and renamed it Randle Highlands. Streetcar service reached the area by 1905, but the lots where Texas Gardens Apartments was later built remained undeveloped for several decades.

Development in the area increased after the completion of a new Pennsylvania Avenue bridge in 1939. The intersection of Pennsylvania and Minnesota avenues SE, known as L'Enfant Square, developed as a commercial center serving Randle Highlands, Hillcrest and Fairlawn. The District's wartime population growth during World War II increased demand for apartment housing, and Texas Gardens Apartments was built as part of that broader pattern of development.

Abe Feinstein purchased the lots in 1942. On July 13, 1943, he applied for a building permit for an apartment building designed by Charles E. Marzadro. The permit described a brick and concrete-block building with steam heat and an estimated construction cost of $100,000. It was designed with 152 rooms for 44 families. A final inspection was conducted on June 21, 1944.

After completion, the building was advertised with efficiency, one-bedroom, two-bedroom and three-bedroom apartments. It was managed by several real estate companies during the mid-20th century, including Nan and Porter Realty Company, Brennan and Porter, Jess Fisher and Company, Harry Poretsky and Sons, Shannon and Luchs, Dismer Auxier Real Estate Company and William J. Davis Inc.

== Significance ==
Texas Gardens Apartments was nominated under the multiple property documentation form Apartment Buildings in Washington, D.C., 1880–1945. The building was listed under National Register Criteria A and C in the areas of community planning and development, social history and architecture.

The National Register nomination identifies Texas Gardens as a conventional low-rise apartment building, a type that became common in Washington during the first half of the 20th century. Buildings of this type were typically two to four stories tall, lacked elevators and were built to provide multi-family housing on land served by public transportation and utilities.

Architecturally, the building is significant as an Art Deco apartment building in southeast Washington. Its rounded corner, glass block, geometric masonry and vertical brick detailing reflect Art Deco design trends used in Washington apartment and commercial buildings during the 1930s and 1940s.

== See also ==
- National Register of Historic Places listings in Southeast Quadrant, Washington, D.C.
- Randle Highlands
