= Officer's Quarters =

Officer's Quarters may refer to:

- Officers Quarters, Washington Navy Yard, listed on the National Register of Historic Places in Washington, D.C.
- Officer's Quarters (Tucson, Arizona), listed on the National Register of Historic Places in Pima County, Arizona
- Officer's Quarters (Fort Gibson, Oklahoma), listed on the National Register of Historic Places in Muskogee County, Oklahoma
