= Hill East =

Neighborhood in Washington, D.C.

- Neighborhood of Washington, D.C.
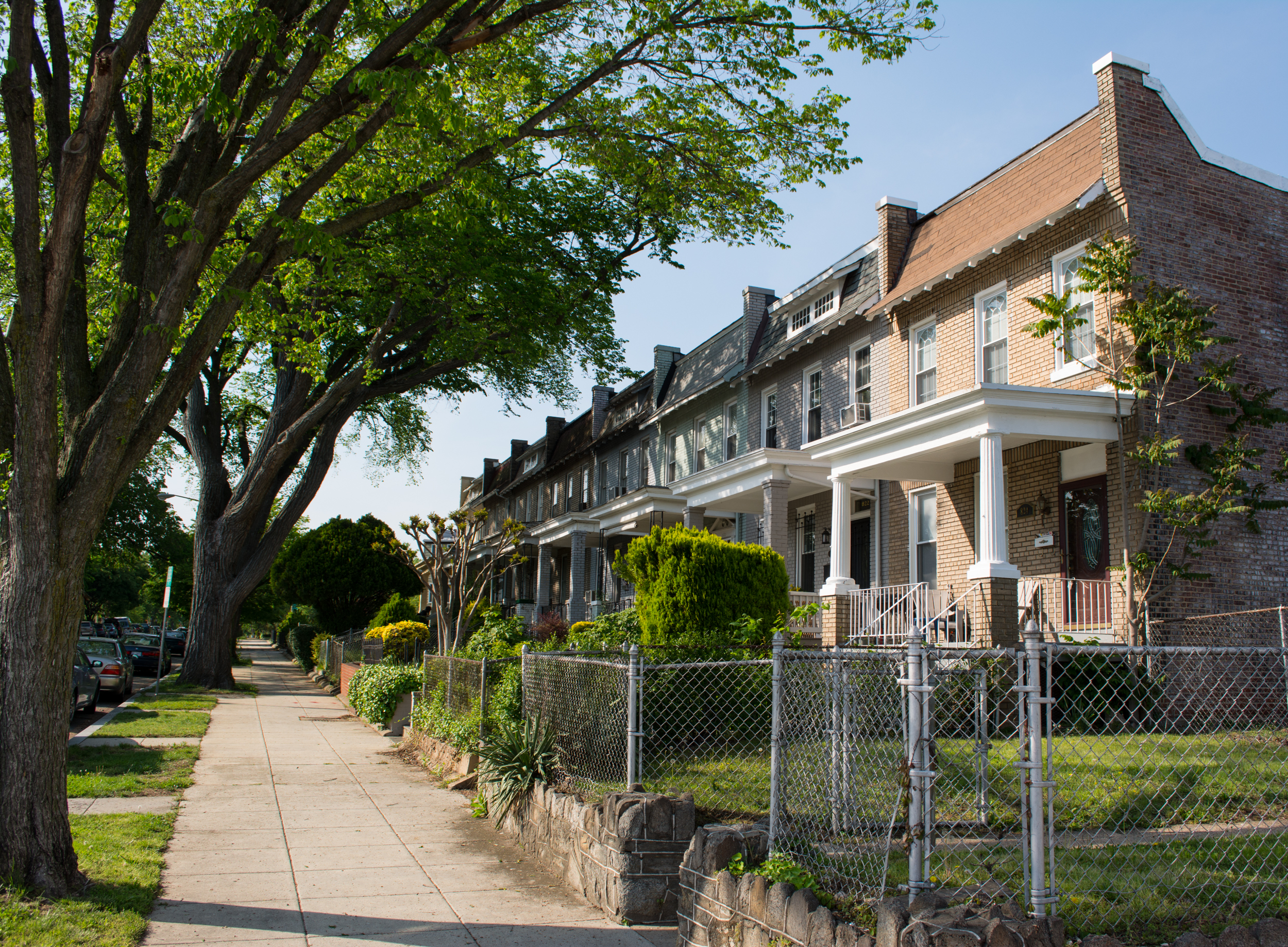
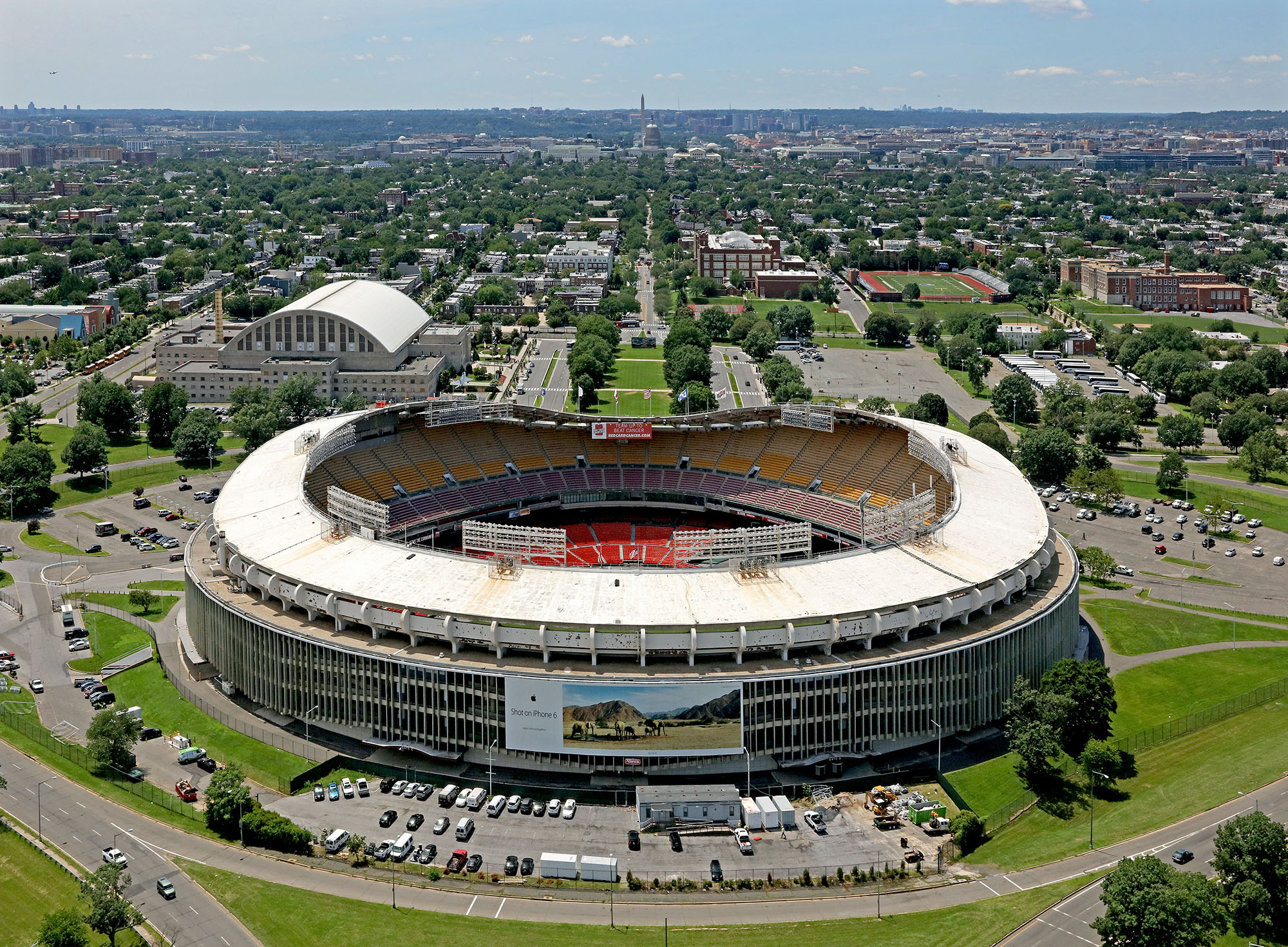
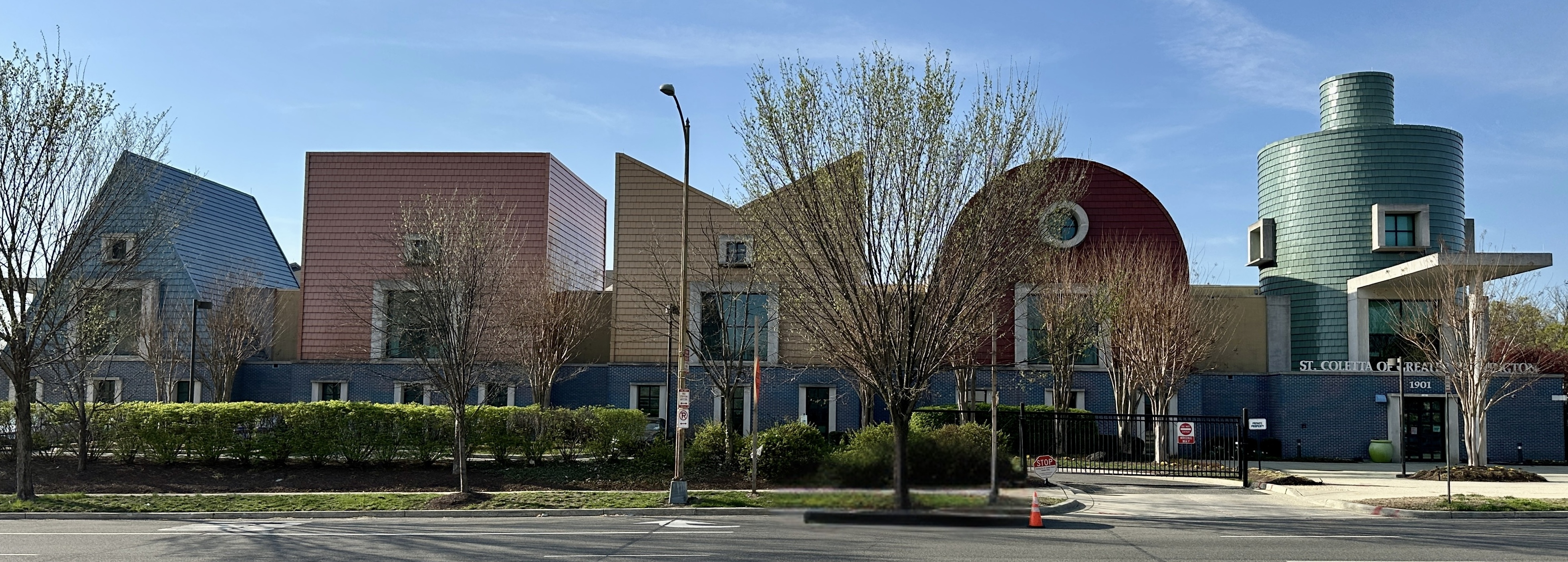
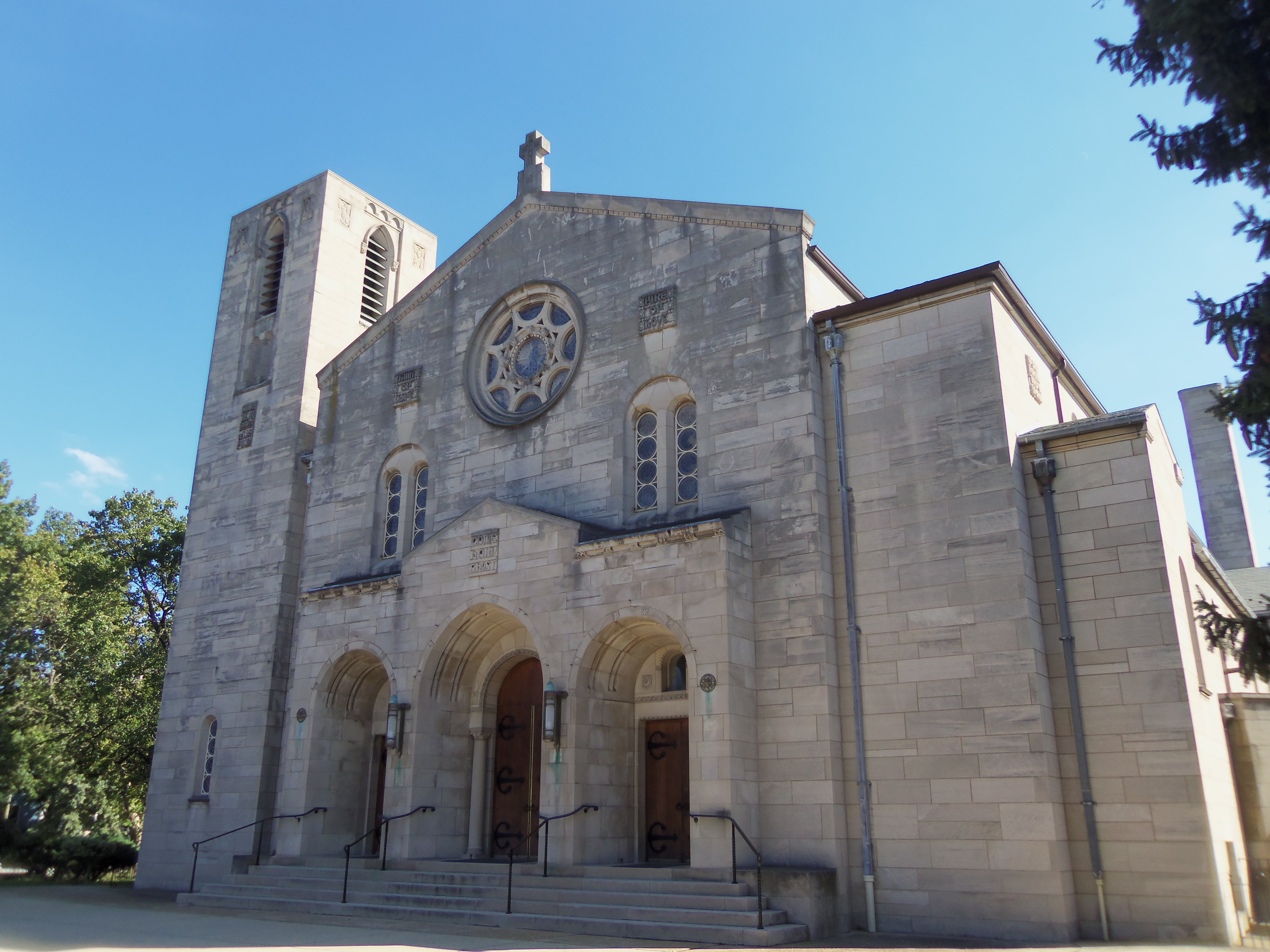
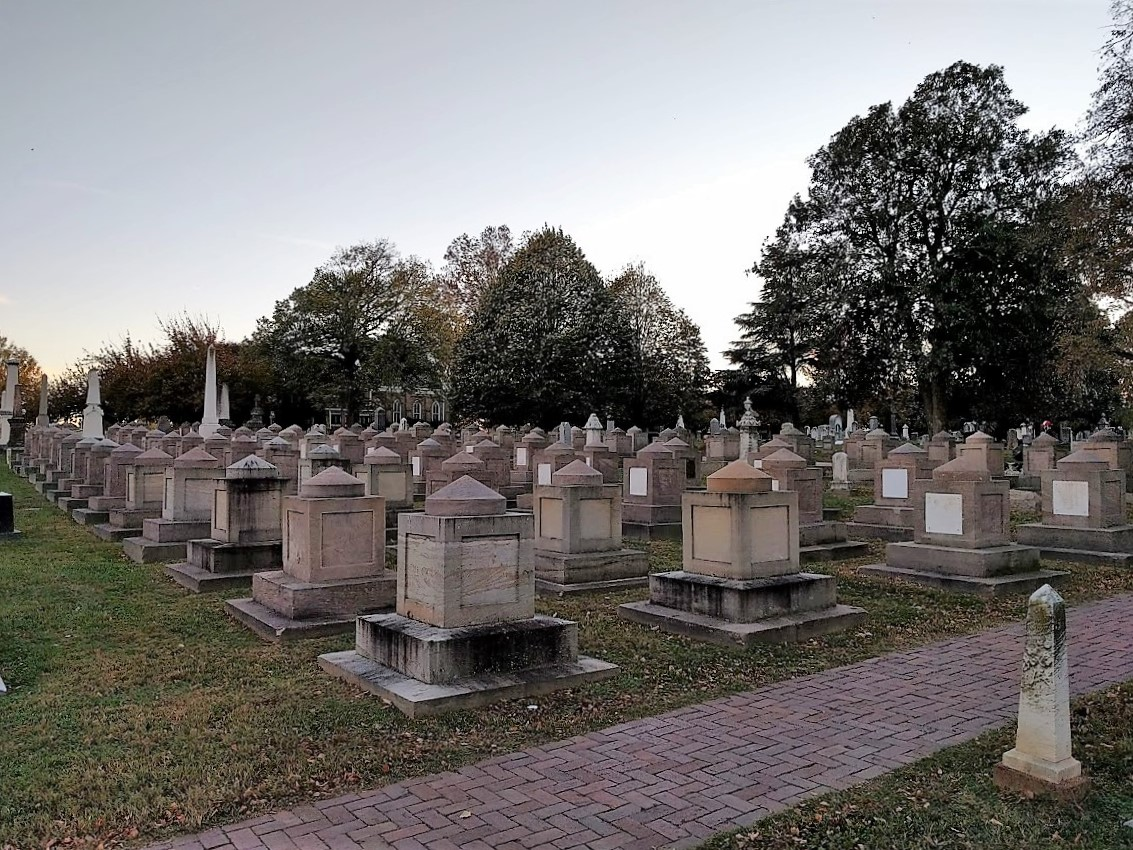
- Top: Residential rowhouses (left) and RFK Stadium (right); middle: St.Coletta of Greater Washington; bottom: Holy Comforter-St. Cyprian Catholic Church (left) and the Congressional Cemetery (right)

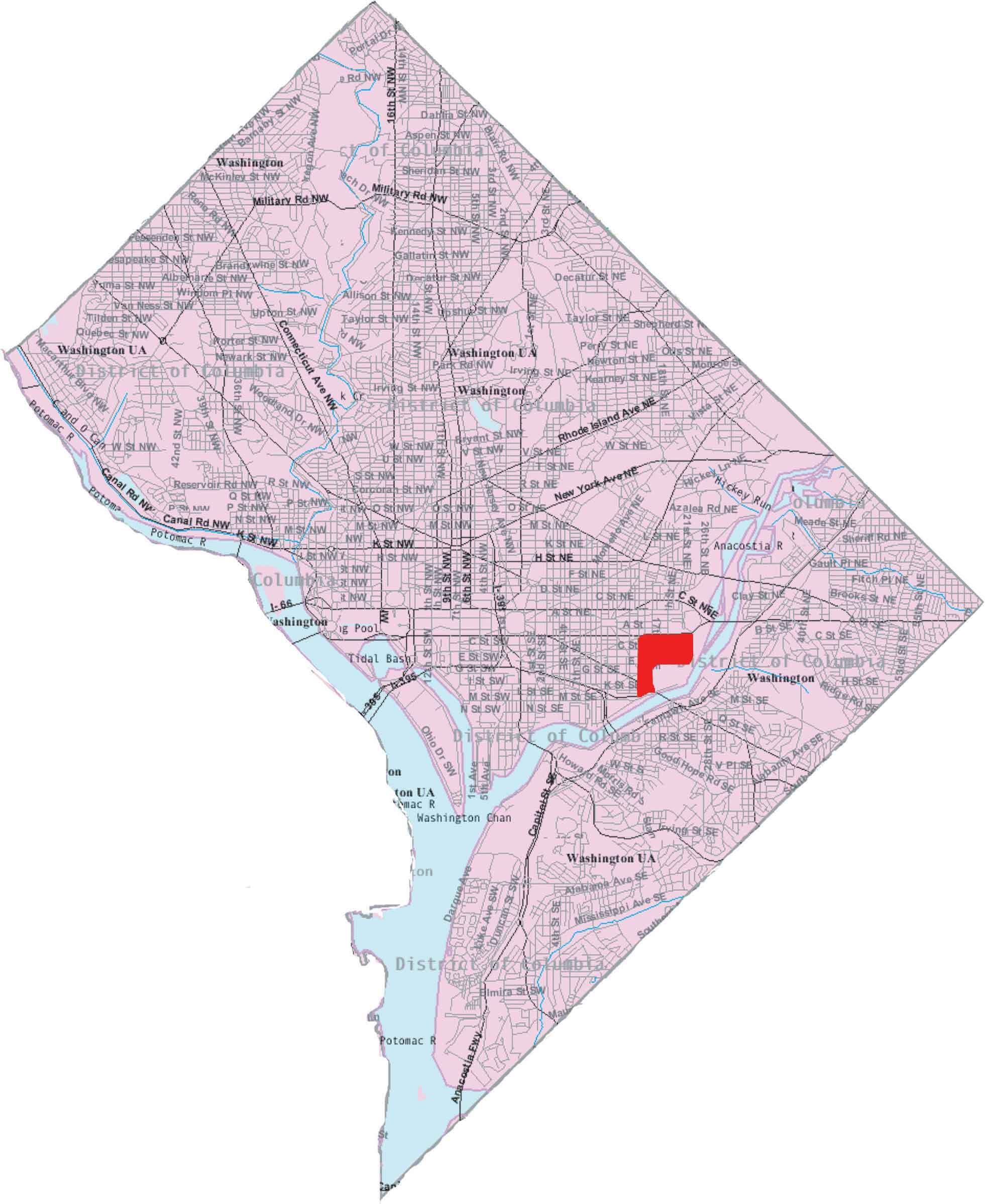
- Hill East within the District of Columbia
- Coordinates: 38°53′6.72″N 76°58′44.40″W
- Country: United States
- District: Washington, D.C.
- Quadrants: Southeast
- Ward: 7

Government
  - Councilmember: Wendell Felder
- ZIP code: 20003
- Area code: 202
- Website: https://hilleastcivicassociation.org

Hill East is a residential neighborhood in Washington, D.C. located in the Southeast quadrant of the city. It is bounded by the Kingman Park neighborhood at East Capitol Street SE to the north, by the Anacostia River to the east and south, and by Capitol Hill at 15th Street to the west. Hill East includes landmarks such as the Congressional Cemetery, the former RFK Stadium, and the D.C. Armory. New Stadium at RFK Campus will open in 2030.

== History ==
Hill East is the contemporary name for the eastern end of the Capitol Hill neighborhood, coined to give the area its own modern identity distinct from the historic district. While the area had long been part of Capitol Hill, particularly Barney Circle, Hill East as a distinct neighborhood began circulating in the mid-2010s and formally by the D.C. government by the end of the decade. The existing neighborhood is primarily early 20th‑century brick rowhouses—flat‑front Wardman-style homes with full-width porches, and some Victorian models—with small front lawns, alleys, and occasional carriage houses. The community gardens, tree-lined streets, and area green spaces contribute to the neighborhood's reputation as a nature-rich enclave within Washington, D.C.. Hill East and adjacent Kingman Park are the only Ward 7 neighborhoods west of the Anacostia River.

== Landmarks ==
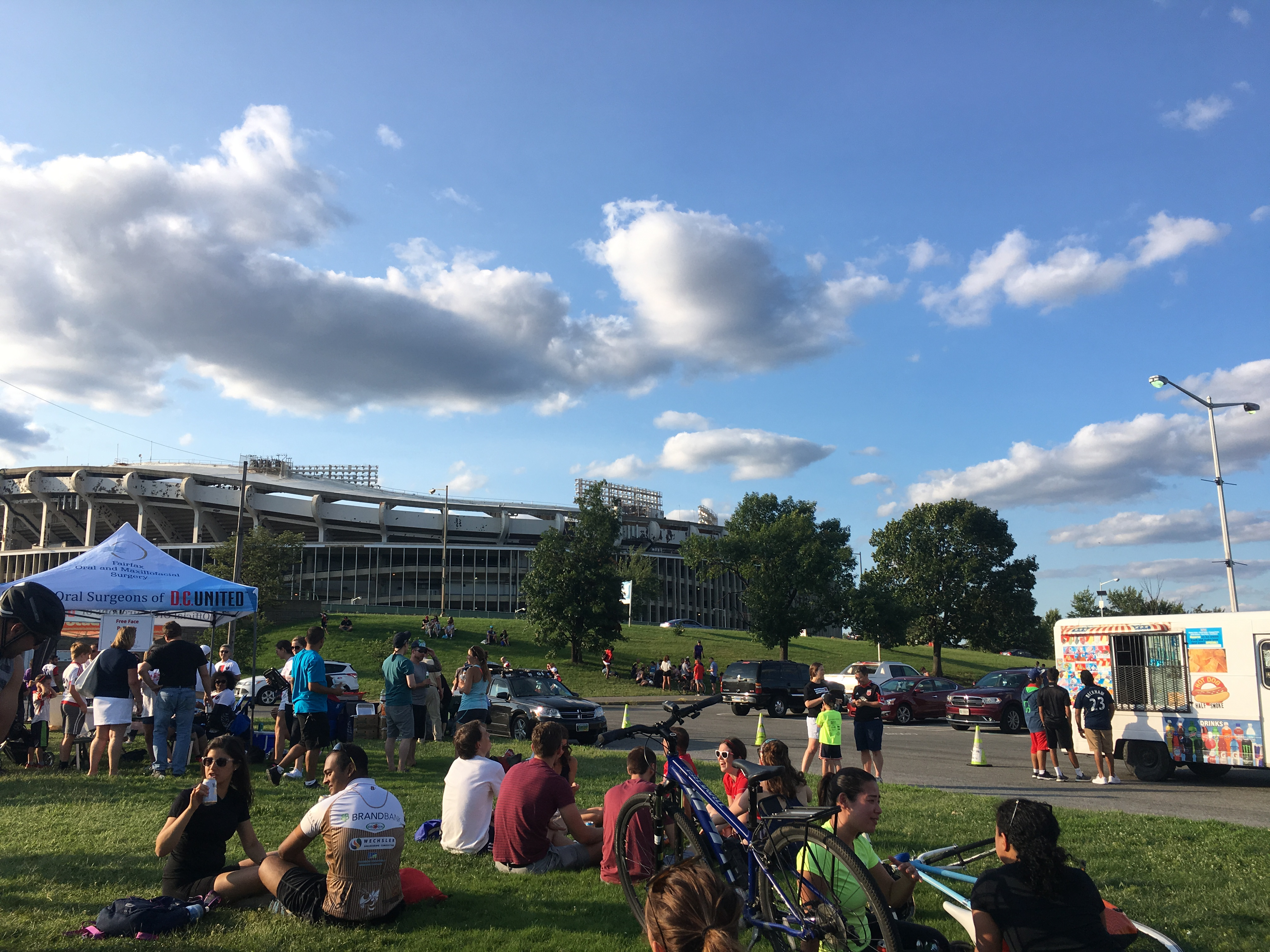
Gathering of people on the campus of the former RFK Stadium

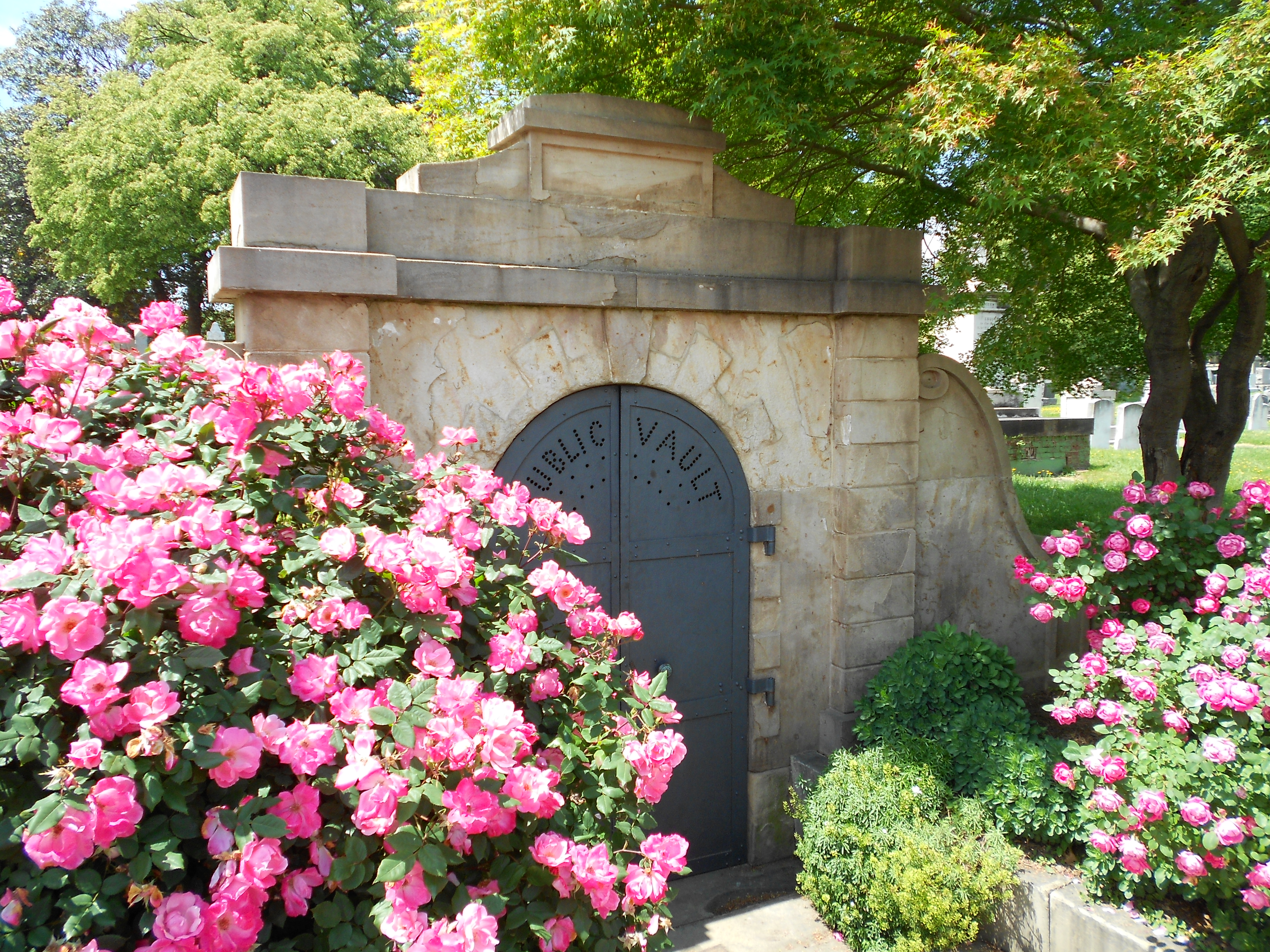
Public Vault at the Congressional Cemetery

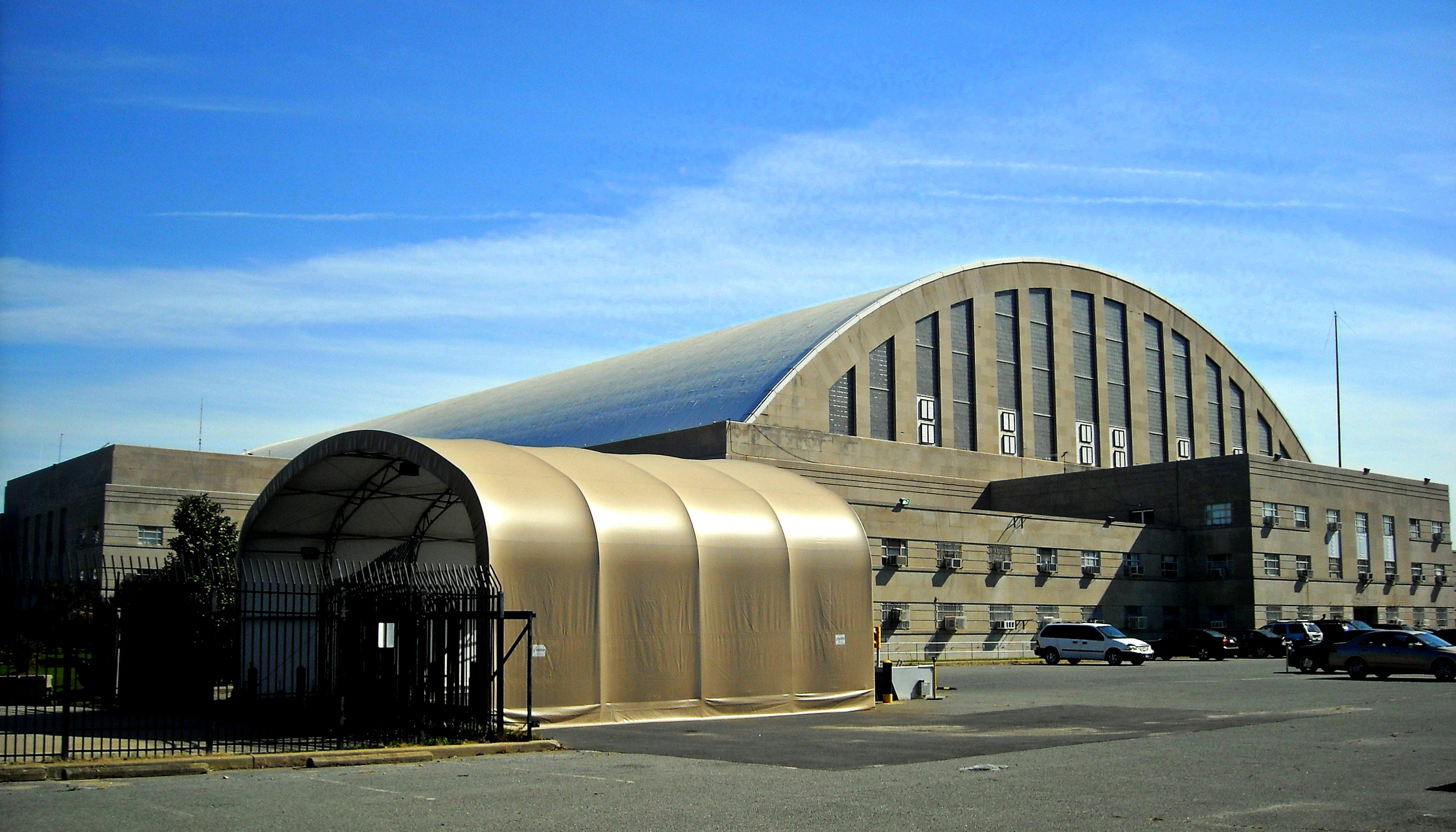
D.C. Armory

Hill East is home to several landmarks. The Congressional Cemetery, established in 1807, serves as the final resting place for numerous notable figures, including members of Congress and early local residents. South of Congressional Cemetery is the Seafarers Yacht Club. Established in 1945, it is often referred to as the oldest African American boat club on the East Coast. The nearby D.C. Jail has operated as the city's main correctional facility since the 1970s. Adjacent to it is the site of the former District of Columbia General Hospital, previously known as Gallinger Municipal Hospital, which functioned as the city's primary public hospital until its closure in 2001 and demolition in 2018.

Along East Capitol Street, Holy Comforter–St. Cyprian Catholic Church, a historic African American parish, has been a center of community life and worship in the area for over a century. The East Capitol Car Barn, an architecturally distinctive former streetcar facility, has been repurposed for residential and community use. On the eastern edge of the neighborhood the D.C. Armory, built in 1941 as a National Guard training facility, has since served as a major Washington, D.C. venue for military events, sports, concerts, and civic gatherings, and Robert F. Kennedy Memorial Stadium (RFK Stadium) was the home venue for the Washington Redskins football team among other sports teams and large-scale events.

== Development ==
Since 2018, the Government of the District of Columbia has been actively transforming the Hill East neighborhood with initial focus on Reservation 13, formerly the D.C. General Hospital campus, into a mixed-use waterfront district under the 2002 Anacostia Waterfront Initiative.

Phase I—completed by Donatelli/Blue Skye Development—delivered over 360 housing units (including permanent supportive and deeply affordable units) along with ground-floor retail. Phase II—completed by Donatelli/Blue Skye for Bundle 1 and R13 Community Partners for Bundle 2—are building a combined ~2,300 units, including deeply affordable, middle-income, and market-rate housing, plus around 60,000 sq ft of retail, a 150‑room Marriott hotel, and new parks honoring RFK's legacy as well as a park dedicated to Relisha Rudd, who was kidnapped from a homeless shelter on the site and murdered back in 2014. As of June 2025, infrastructure work—including relocation of a major 72‑inch sewer line and roadway design—is well underway, with vertical construction for some Bundle II parcels anticipated from 2026.

A $3.8 billion, 180‑acre mixed-use development project centered around the New Stadium at RFK Campus will be built on the former site of RFK Stadium. In addition to the stadium, the area would feature 6,000 housing units, retail, restaurants, hotels, offices, and public space. Construction is set to begin in 2026 ahead of the stadium's planned opening in 2030, with its adjacent districts being built out through the 2030s.

== Education ==
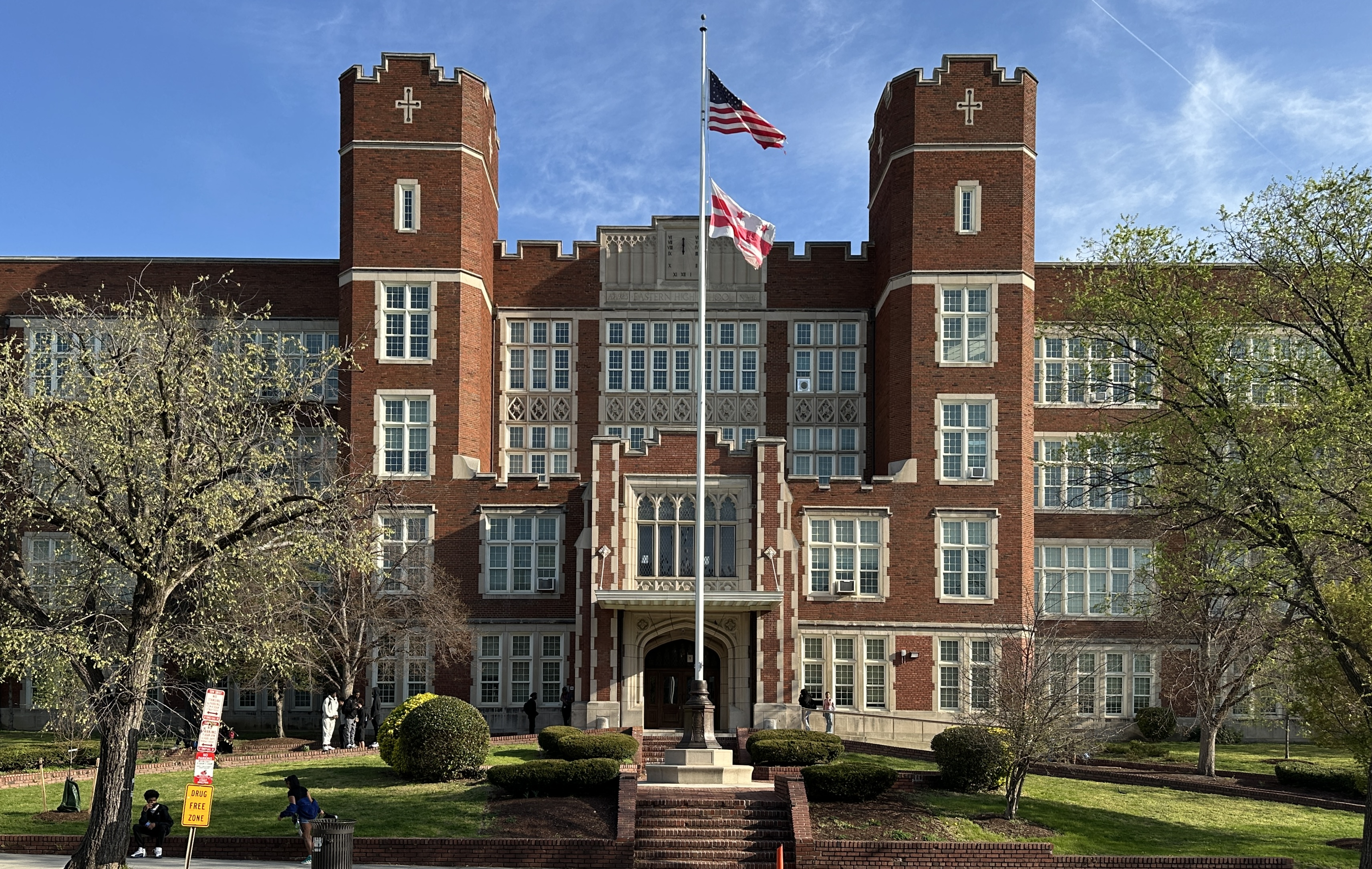
Eastern High School

The District of Columbia Public Schools operates public schools in the area. Hill East is served by Eastern High School, Eliott-Hine Middle School, Payne Elementary School and Capitol Hill Cluster School, which consist of Stuart-Hobson Middle School, Watkins Elementary School and Peabody Elementary School.

St. Coletta of Greater Washington, which operates a special education school and City Center Public Charter School have campuses in Hill East.

== Transportation ==
Hill East is served by the Washington Metro's Stadium–Armory station, which serves the Blue, Orange, and Silver rail lines. With the New Stadium at RFK Campus expected to open in 2030, Metro proposed expanding Stadium–Armory with additional escalators and elevators, a new mezzanine, and an enlarged north entrance. They also proposed creating a new bus rapid transit (BRT) route, known as the Gold Line, which would operate in dedicated bus lanes in the center of the road. The line's western terminus would be Washington Union Station, from where it would travel east along H Street before reaching a new transit center near the stadium along Benning Road, closely mirroring the route of the defunct H Street Streetcar. The entire transit plan is estimated to cost $300–400 million.
