= List of works by Benjamin Henry Latrobe =

Works by Benjamin Henry Latrobe, a British-born architect, were influenced by Greek Revival styles and those of British architect John Soane. Latrobe emigrated to the United States, living initially in Virginia, then in Philadelphia, before being hired to work on government projects in Washington, D.C. His works most notably included the central portion of the United States Capitol, along with designing the porticoes of the White House. He also designed numerous houses and other buildings.

Latrobe worked on various engineering projects, as well, including the Philadelphia waterworks, along with projects in New Orleans where he spent the last years of his life. He wrote quite a bit, including extensive notes in his journals, which have since been published, and he translated works by others.

== Architecture ==
Latrobe's many architectural works include:

Work	Place	Year	Notes	Image
Hammerwood Park	East Grinstead, UK	1792		
Ashdown House	East Sussex, UK	1793		
William Pennock House	Norfolk, Virginia	1796		
Virginia State Penitentiary	Richmond, Virginia	1797–1798		
Gamble Hill (Col. John Harvie's home)	Richmond	1798		
Bank of Pennsylvania	Philadelphia	1798–1801	First major Greek Revival building in the United States.	
Sedgeley	Philadelphia	1799–1802	Built for William Cramond on the Schuylkill River, but the mansion fell into disrepair after 1836 when it was subdivided. It was demolished in 1857, and the land is now part of Fairmount Park. A tenant's cottage build along with the mansion remains in existence — the cottage is the only remaining building in Philadelphia designed by Latrobe.	
Sansom's Buildings	Philadelphia	1800–1801	with Thomas Carstairs	
Edward Shippen Burd House	Philadelphia	1801–1802	Located at Chestnut and 9th Street; Architectural characteristics similar to the Admiralty House in London, designed by Samuel Pepys Cockerell.	
Nassau Hall	Princeton, New Jersey	1802	Originally designed by Robert Smith, and for a period in 1783, it hosted the Congress of the Confederation. The building was later redesigned by Latrobe, after a fire destroyed the building, though it was destroyed once again by fire in 1855 and rebuilt by Philadelphia architect John Notman.	
Stanhope Hall	Princeton, New Jersey	1803	The third building of Princeton University's campus and originally home to the library, study halls, and literary societies. Later known as "Geological Hall," in 1915 it was named in honor of Samuel Stanhope Smith, president of the university at the time of its construction.	
Basilica of the National Shrine of the Assumption of the Blessed Virgin Mary	Baltimore	1806–1821	First Catholic Cathedral built in the United States	
Waln House	Philadelphia	1807–1808		
Clifton House	Richmond, Virginia	1808	Built for Benjamin James Harris, the house featured squarish-dimensions and a central, multi-story hall with a cupola to provide lighting.	
Markoe House	Philadelphia	1808–1811	Built for John Markoe, who later sold it and it was used as a boarding house until the 1880s when it was demolished.	
Long Branch	Millwood, Virginia	1811	Built for Robert Carter Burwell	
Portico of Belleview	Washington, D.C.	1813		
Ashland	Lexington, Kentucky	1813	Built two wings onto the home.	
Brentwood	Washington, D.C.	1817	Florida Avenue and 6th St NE; Destroyed by fire in 1917	
Van Ness Mansion	Washington, D.C.	1813–1818	Later demolished	
Christ Church	Washington, D.C.	1807	The building used by the city's first Episcopal parish was designed in the Gothic Revival style.	
Decatur House	Washington, D.C.	1818	Located on Jackson Place	
United States Capitol	Washington, D.C.		Central portion only, including original low dome	
Davidge Hall	Baltimore		The building known today as Davidge Hall, completed in 1812, is part of the University of Maryland School of Medicine. It is the oldest building in the Northern Hemisphere in continuous use for medical education.	
University of Pennsylvania Medical School	Philadelphia		Designed in collaboration with his apprentice, William Strickland; Demolished in 1874.	
Pope Villa	Lexington, Kentucky	1811–1812	326 Grosvenor Avenue; The house was the first to incorporate an English basement.	
Adena Mansion	Chillicothe, Ohio	1806		
Taft Museum of Art	Cincinnati	1820	Originally the home of Martin Baum	
St. John's Church	Washington, D.C.	1816		
St. Paul's Church	Alexandria, Virginia	1818		
The White House east and west colonnades	Washington, D.C.		Designed in collaboration with Thomas Jefferson, and north and south porticos, with James Hoban	
Latrobe Gate, Washington Navy Yard	Washington, D.C.	1806	Believed to be the oldest extant example of Greek Revival architecture in the United States.	
West College, or Old West at Dickinson College	Carlisle, Pennsylvania	1803		
Belvidere	Belmont, New York	1804	Built in 1804 from plans attributed to Latrobe.	

== Writing ==
Benjamin Henry Latrobe authored several books and translated others, including:

- Characteristic Anecdotes ... to Illustrate the Character of Frederick the Great (1788)
- Authentic Elucidation of the History of Counts Struensee [sic] and Brandt and of the Revolution in Denmark in the Year 1772 (1789)

James Bruce hired Latrobe in 1790 to help put together Travels, a memoir of Bruce's journeys in Africa.

After he arrived in the United States, Latrobe befriended Constantin-François Chassebœuf, comte de Volney, who stimulated an interest in geology. Latrobe kept numerous journals with geological notes and published a number of papers, including "Memoir on the Sand Hills of Cape Henry" (1799), Transactions of the American Philosophical Society (vol. 4, pp 439–44).
