= Engine Company 19 (Washington, D.C.) =

- Engine Company No. 19
- U.S. National Register of Historic Places
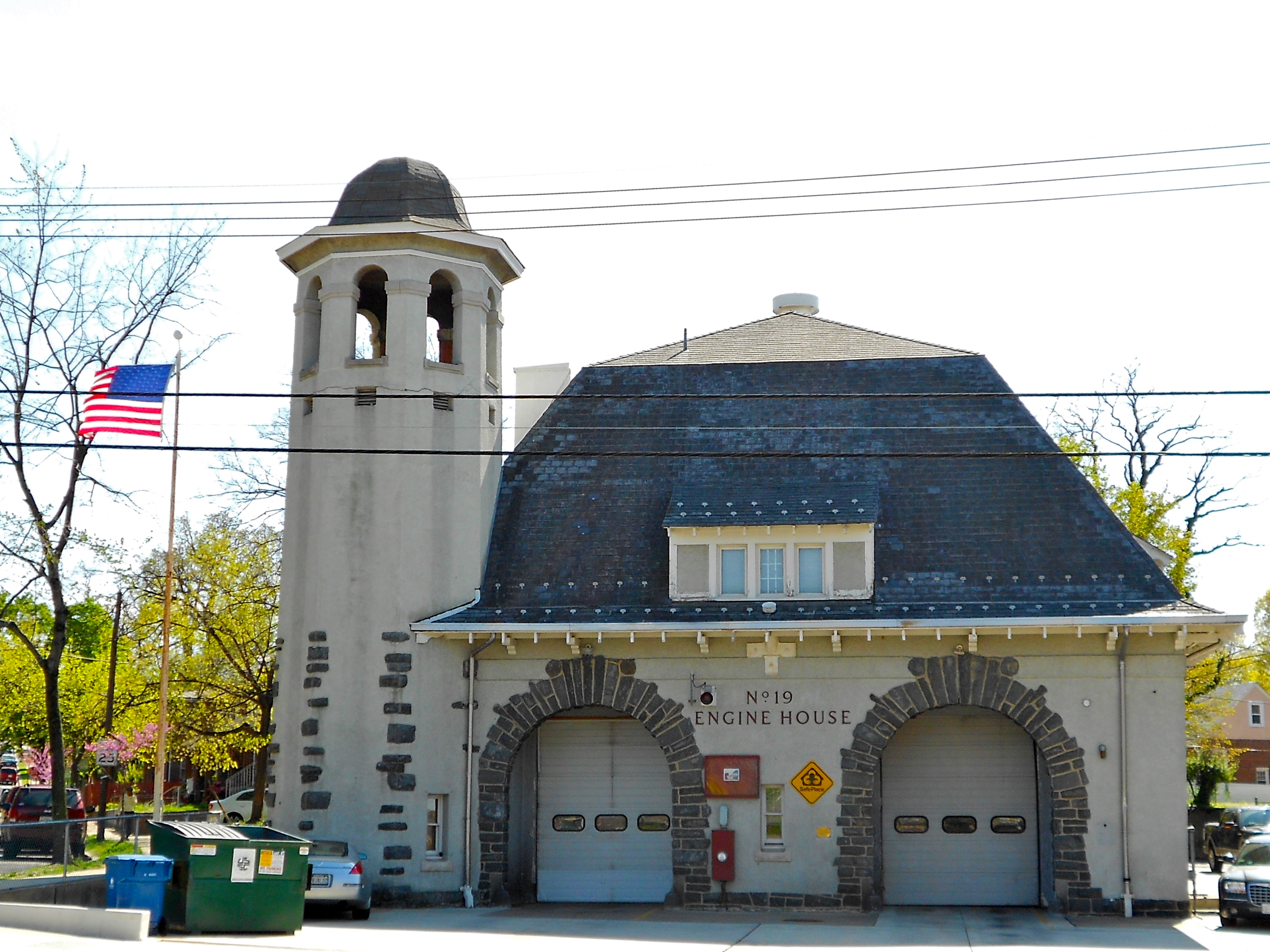
- Engine Company 19 building (2012)

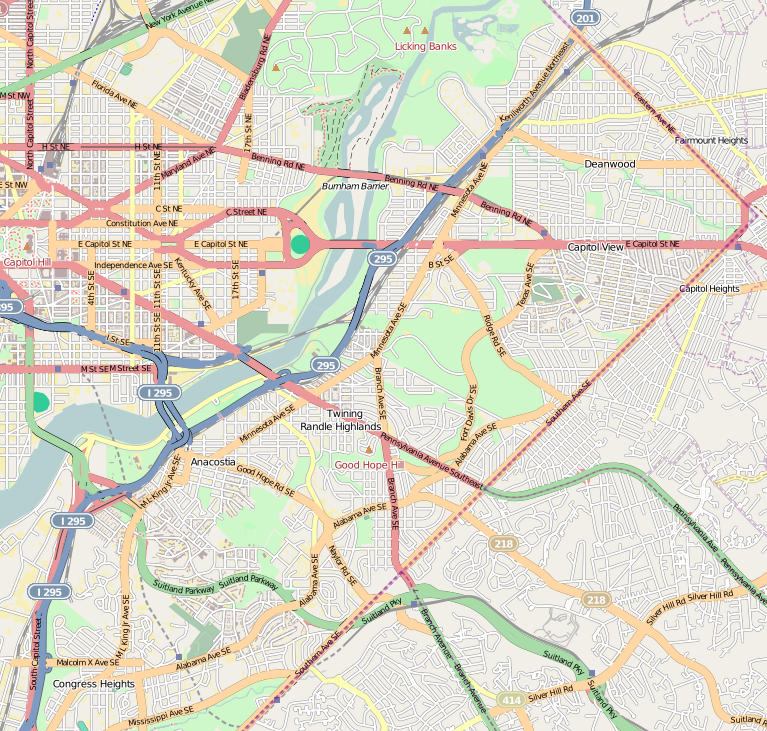
- Location within Washington, D.C.
- Location: 2813 Pennsylvania Ave., SE; Washington, D.C.
- Coordinates: 38°52′24″N 76°58′01″W
- Area: less than one acre
- Built: 1910
- Architect: Averill and Adams
- MPS: Firehouses in Washington DC MPS
- NRHP reference No.: 10000238
- Added to NRHP: May 10, 2010

Engine Company No. 19 is a historic Engine house in Southeast Washington, D.C.'s Randle Highlands neighborhood. It was listed on the District of Columbia Inventory of Historic Sites in 2009 and it was listed on the National Register of Historic Places in 2010.

== History ==
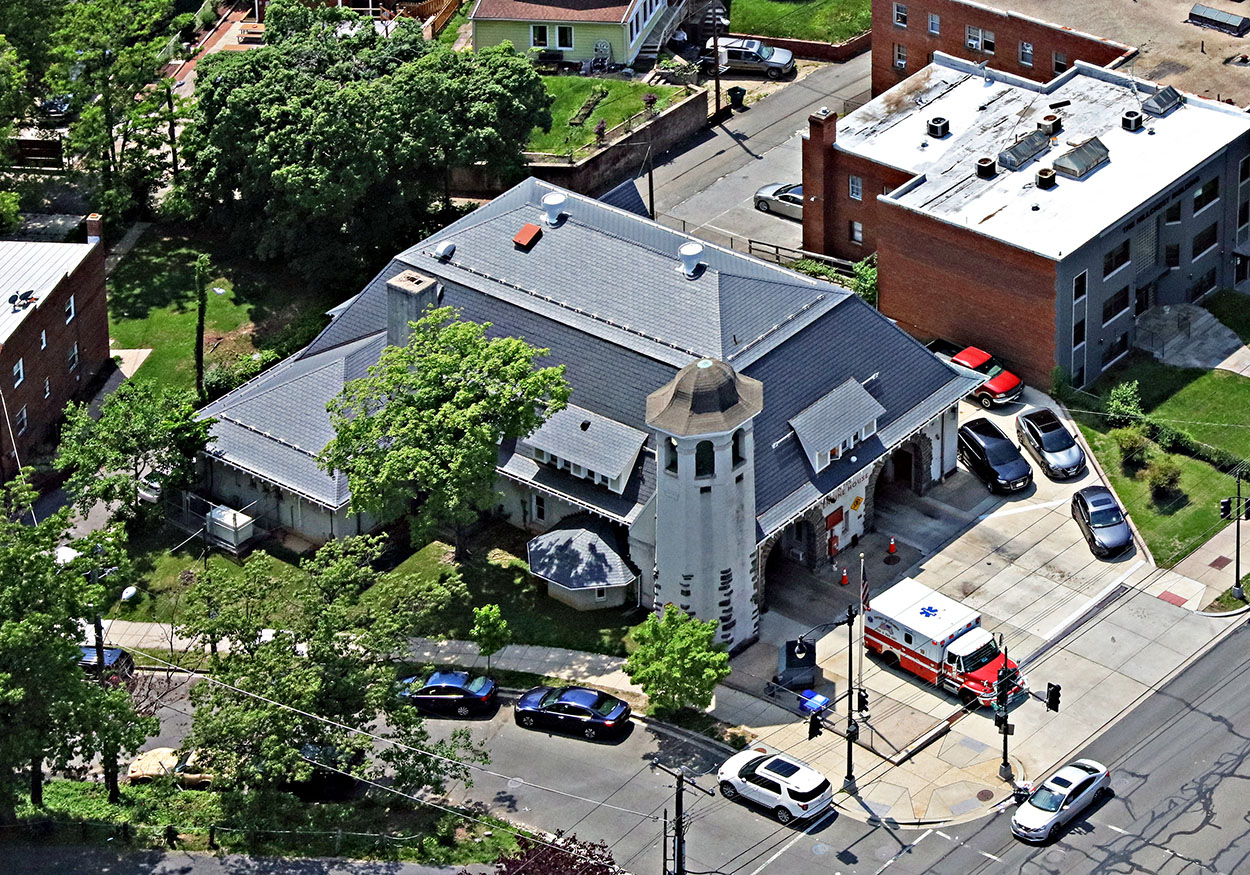
Engine Company 19 Washington DC

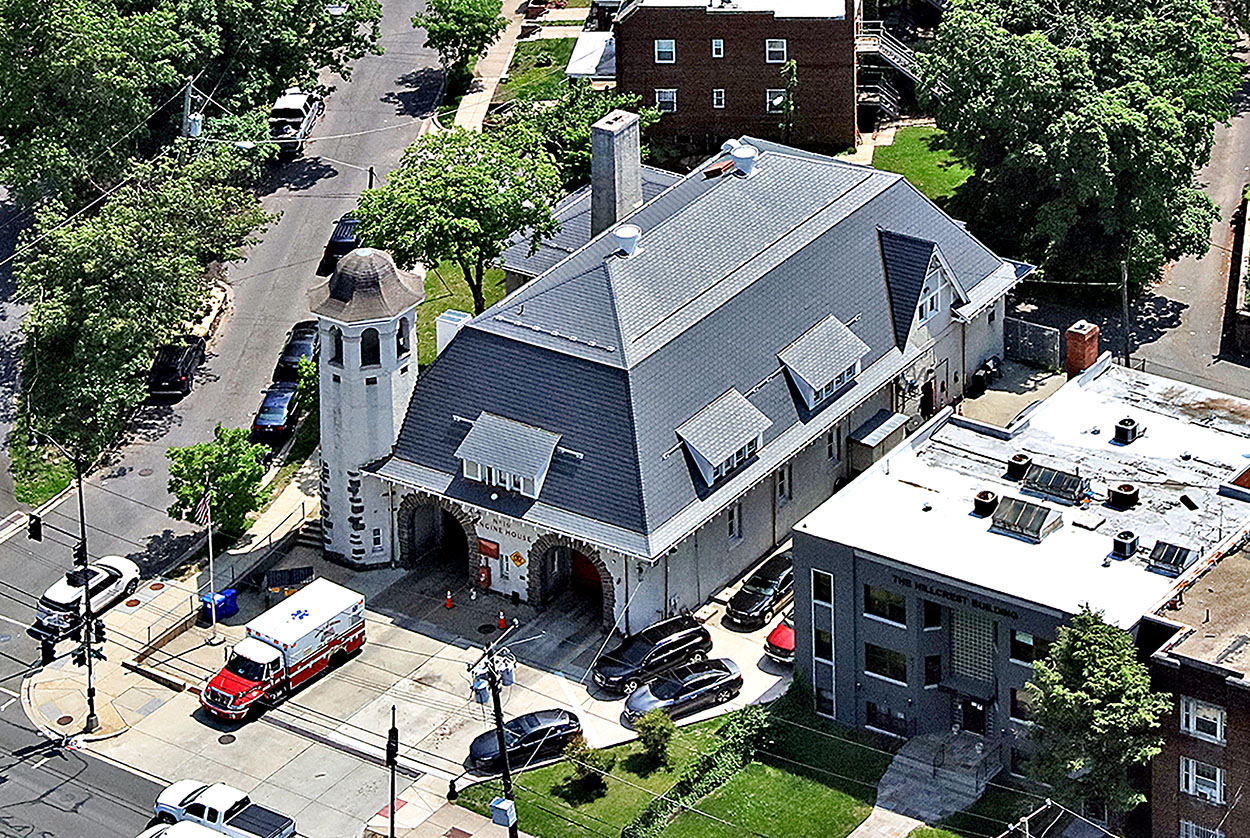
Engine Company 19 Washington DC

The first fire station east of the Anacostia River was built in 1898. This station, designed by the Washington, D.C. architectural firm of Averill and Adams, was the fourth built there in 1910. The eclectic style, principally French revival, reflected the desire by the Office of the Municipal Architect to create unique designs for new fire stations. At the time, this part of the District of Columbia was considered a suburban district because it was beyond public water service and the street alarm system. Chemical Company Number 2 was housed here for that reason. The building's hose tower was also used as a lookout post. It joined with the last of the District's Chemical companies in being converted to a regular engine company on January 1, 1921 when it became Engine Company 19. In 1925 it was the last company in the department to switch from horse drawn apparatus to motorized.
