= Thomas Tingey =

English commodore (1750–1829)

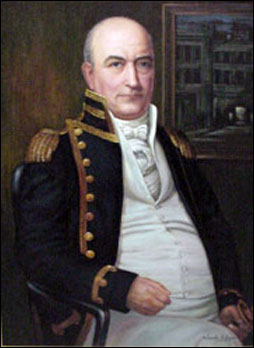
- Commodore Tingey in uniform
- Born: 11 September 1750; London, England
- Died: 23 February 1829 (aged 78); Washington, D.C., US
- Resting place: Congressional Cemetery

Thomas Tingey (11 September 1750 – 23 February 1829) was a commodore of the United States Navy. Originally serving in the British Royal Navy, he later served in the Continental Navy and with distinction during the Quasi-War. Tingey served as the first commandant of the Navy Yard until his death.

== Biography ==
=== Early life ===
Tingey was born in London on 11 September 1750. As a youth, he served in the British Royal Navy as a midshipman aboard HMS Panther and later in July 1771 commanded a blockhouse at Chateaux Bay on the Labrador coast. He later commanded merchant vessels in the West Indies before coming to the colonies and investing in the East India Company. According to unverified tradition, Tingey served in the Continental Navy during the American War for Independence.

=== Navy career ===
In September 1798 Tingey was commissioned a captain in the United States Navy and distinguished himself in the Quasi War with France, as commander of the man-of-war Ganges. During that time, Tingey commanded a squadron which cruised the waters of the Windward Passage between Hispaniola and Cuba to protect American shipping from French privateers. Tingey commanded Ganges as she took four prizes and is known for his bloodless encounter with the British frigate HMS Surprise. He was discharged from the Navy following the conclusion of the Quasi War in 1802.

=== Washington Navy Yard ===
In January 1800, Tingey was appointed to supervise construction of the new Washington Navy Yard at Washington, D.C. He was well connected in Washington D.C. political circles and had close relations with members of Thomas Jefferson and James Madison's cabinet. In a letter dated 7 April, 1803 the Secretary of the Navy accepted his resignation as Superintendent of the Yard, Lt. John Cassin was ordered to take command. On 23 November 1804, he was again commissioned a captain in the Navy and made Commandant of the Washington Navy Yard and naval agent, posts he held until his death.

During his long tenure at WNY, Tingey was a strong advocate for enslaved labor. The 1808 Navy Yard muster and payroll's reflected, the practice of placing the enslaved on the Navy Yard payroll was both widespread and profitable. Tingey and other naval officers were able to supplement their pay by drawing the wages and rations of their enslaved "servants"who appeared on the Navy payrolls as "Ordinary Seaman'.In his letter to Secretary of the Navy, Robert Smith, 19 May 1808, Tingey stated there was a total of 194 employees in the Washington Navy Yard and "in ordinary"; with 58 enslaved blacks, or 29.9% of the workforce. Ten of these enslaved workers were leased to the Navy by naval officers including Seamen Abram Lynson and Charles Lancaster, (see thumbnail) the Commodore's enslaved "servants". Commodore Tingey, later manumitted the 29 year old Lynson on 21 July 1809. In his conclusion Tingey, cited the custom of the service, and implored Robert Smith to reconsider this ban.

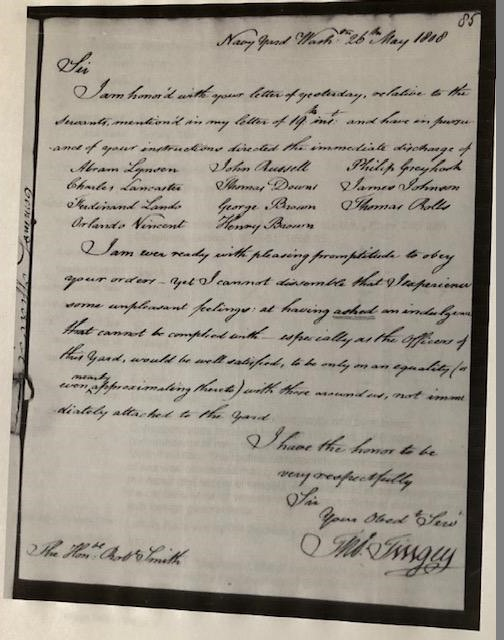
Thomas Tingey, 26 May 1808 to Robert Smith requesting "indulgence" for WNY Naval Officers slaveholders

Smith would not reconsider. Smith's reluctance to grant Tingey's request, stemmed in part, from the recent allegations made by Naval Purser, Samuel Hanson, against both Tingey and his deputy John Cassin (naval officer).Hanson charged both officers had financially profited by placing enslaved laborers belonging to their families and friends on shipyard payrolls. Hanson a friend of Jefferson, had also written to the president, alerting him to the charges. "Smith, a former lawyer, was a close reader and neither he nor Jefferson wanted the publicly of an inquiry...They need not have worried for none of the local newspapers carried any mention of the proposed Inquiry nor are there any notations in the file that Court of Inquiry ever met." The Navy Yard though in 1809 returned to employing enslaved labor with Tingey's request to Secretary Smith to, "...direct the employment in the Ordinary of good Slaves, belonging to this neighborhood - and the number not to exceed twenty at present." On 11 May 1815, an alarmed Board of Navy Commissioners, again wrote Tingey, about WNY employment practices

"Particularly pressure in the employment of characters unsuited for the public service – maimed & unmanageable slaves for the accommodation of distressed widows & orphans & indigent families - apprentices for the accommodation of their masters – & old men & children for the benefit of their families & parents. These practices must cease."

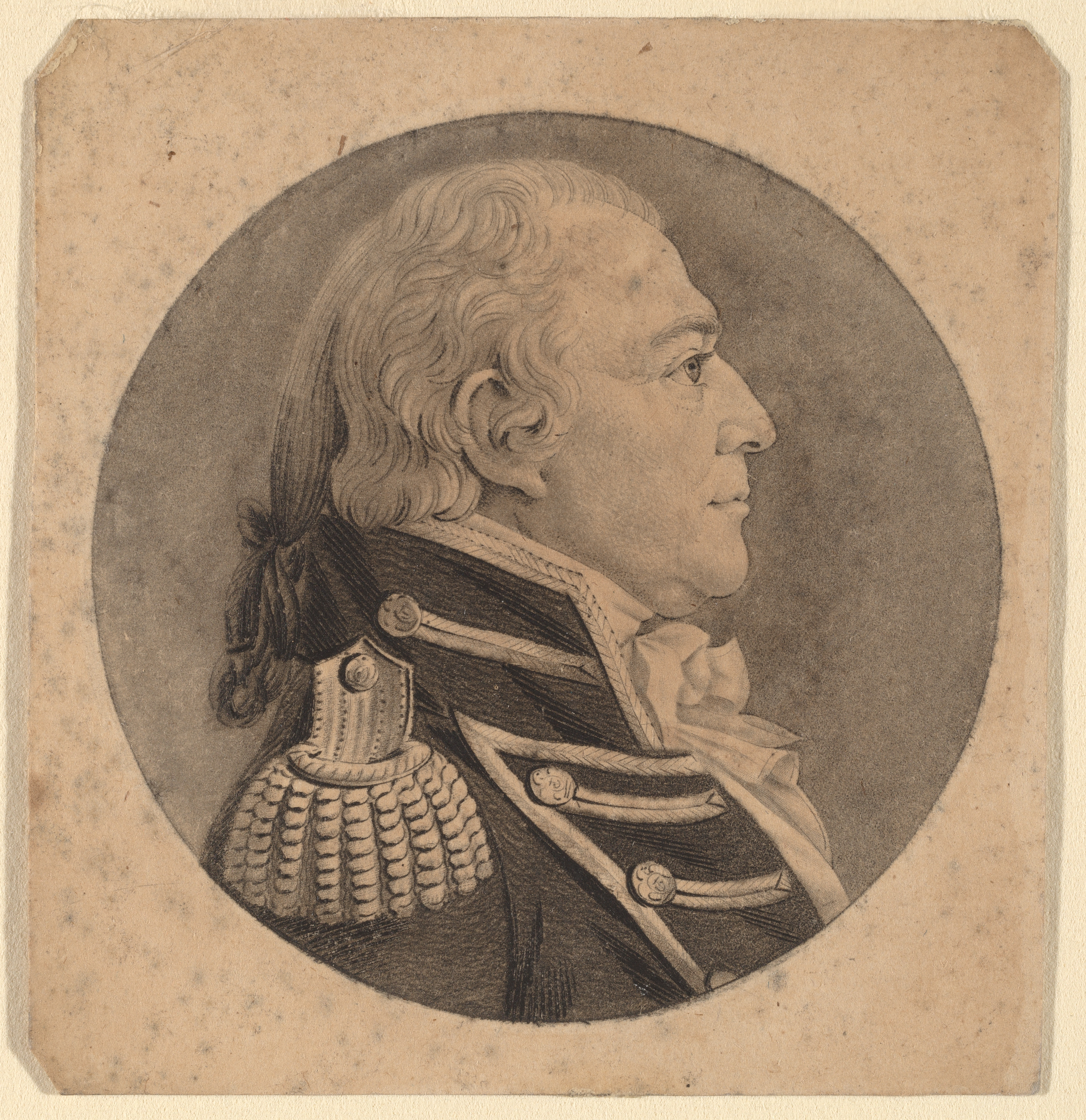
1806 portrait by Charles B. J. Févret de Saint-Mémin

As naval agent in accordance with the naval regulations of the era, Commodore Tingey received 1% of his Washington Navy Yard disbursements as commission. His involvement in procurement and contracting issues soon gave rise to a perception of irregular purchase and an inquiry into these charges on 10 December 1810 Secretary of the Navy Robert Smith establishing inquiry into the Commodore's conduct. The inquiry failed to find any substantive violations.

During Tingey's tenure as commandant, Washington Navy Yard personnel were frequently used to design and test new weapons. Secretary Smith requested Tingey on 6 February and 17 August 1808 arrange a test of Doctor Wallace's invention and Robert Fulton's torpedo both projects which required yard employees and resources.

In August 1814, as the British advanced on Washington, the Secretary of the Navy ordered Tingey to set fire to the yard. He wrote to his daughter under date of 17 September 1814, "I was the last officer who quitted the city after the enemy had possession of it, having fully performed all orders received, in which was included that myself retiring, and not to fall into their possession. I was also the first who returned and the only one who ventured in on the day on which they were peaceably masters of it." Tingey resumed his duties as commandant after the withdrawal of the British forces.

Throughout his twenty-nine year tenure as Washington Navy Yard Commandant, Tingey, exercised his considerable diplomatic acumen in reconciling the often conflicting demands placed upon him. As Yard Commandant, his correspondence reflects his strong desire to achieve balance between the requirements of his political superiors, and the needs and sometimes demands of his employees. The Secretary of the Navy on occasion placed heavy burdens on the Commodore such as directing that Naval Constructors like Josiah Fox and William Doughty be allowed to exercise work direction and hiring authority over Yard employees.

=== Death and burial ===
Tingey died on 23 February 1829. He was buried with military honors in the Congressional Cemetery in Washington, D.C.

=== Societies ===
During the 1820s, Tingey was a member of the prestigious society, Columbian Institute for the Promotion of Arts and Sciences, who counted among their members former presidents Andrew Jackson and John Quincy Adams and many prominent men of the day, including well-known representatives of the military, government service, medical and other professions. On 1 March 1820, Tingey invited naval and marine officers in the District of Columbia to consider a proposal for a Fraternal Society for the relief of indigent officers, their widows and children. As a consequence the Naval Fraternal Association was founded that same year, for families of deceased officers. The association subsequently applied for Congressional incorporation in 1823 but Congress denied their request for fear of the precedent. The association then established a national organization under a District charter.

=== Personal life ===
His daughter Hannah married Tunis Craven, a government clerk and later naval purser. Two of her sons, Tunis and Thomas Tingey rose to prominence in the Union Navy during the American Civil War. Another daughter, Margaret, married U.S. Representative Joseph F. Wingate of Maine. Tingey was generally well liked by his large civilian workforce. Washington Navy Yard enslaved worker Michael Shiner noted Tingey's passing with this tribute, "Died in Command of the Washington navy yard Comerder thomas tinsy on the 23 day of February 1829 on Monday and snow on the ground and a fine officer he was and a gentleman".

=== Slaveholder ===
The 1810 U.S. Census for the District of Columbia enumerated Thomas Tingey as having six enslaved individuals registered in his household. As a slaveholder Commodore Tingey could be "rough and even brutal;" in 1828 diarist Michael Shiner wrote, "The same time they wher a lad comerder tinsay [Commodore Tingey] foot man had been cutting some of his shines at the house on the 4 and they taking him down to the rigging loft that it give him a starting.” A "starting", flagellation, is a beating on the bare back with a thick rope end.

Tingey frequently took the lead in returning escaped slaves to slavery.

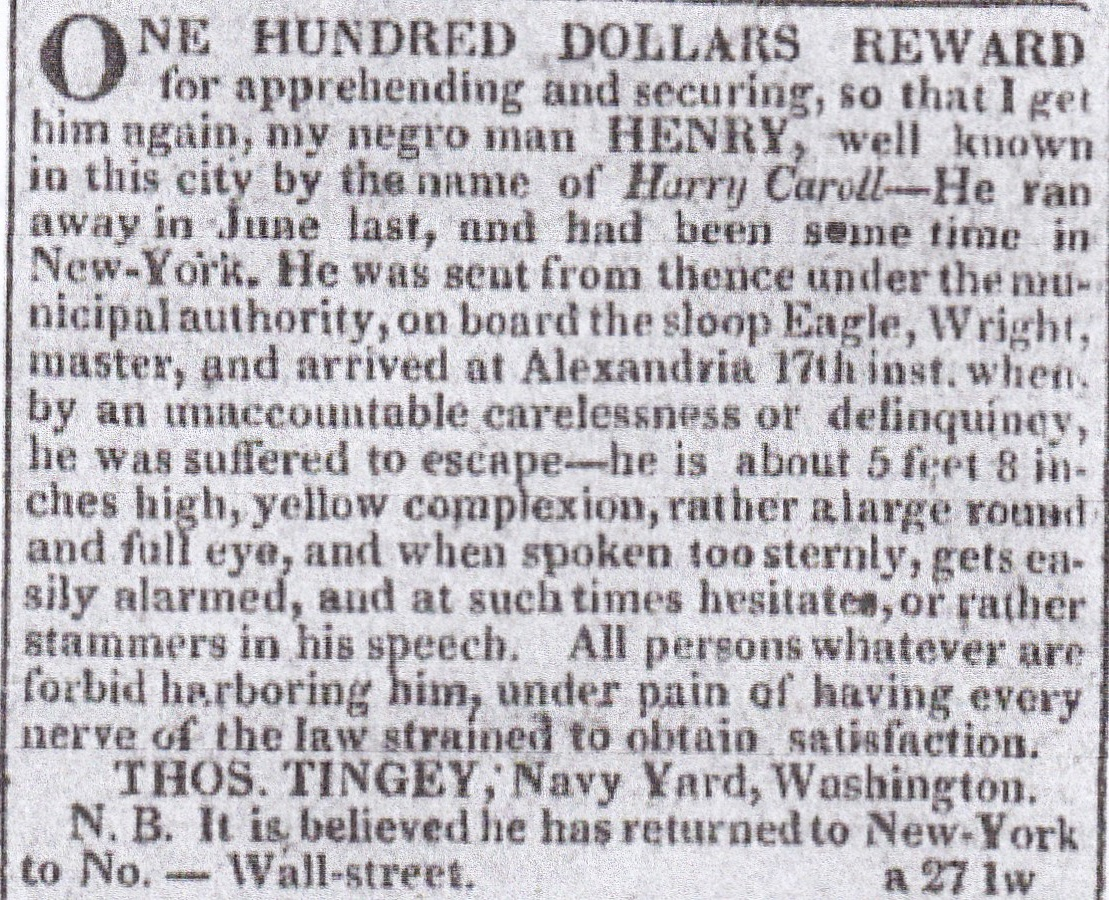
$100 reward for Henry Caroll, Mercantile Advertiser (New York, New York), 2 May 1818, p.2, which also recounts his previous bid for freedom

On 4 January 1820 the Boston Patriot and Daily Advertiser, reported that Commodore Thomas Tingey had secured his enslaved laborer John Howard, and that Tingey's agent was to return him to the District of Columbia. On 16 August 1821 Tingey took out a notice for his enslaved cook and housekeeper, Sukey Dean, stating "But whosoever will secure her in jail or otherwise of the three days advertisement in the city newspapers sells her at public venue for cash shall have on fourth of what she sells for in full cash less any charges." In 1822, Tingey wrote to a colleague that Sukey Dean was seeking employment as a free woman. Tingey offered details on how to capture the enslaved woman, and instructions on how to sell her immediately upon capture.

== Namesake and honors ==
Three ships of the U.S. Navy were named USS Tingey for him, as well as Tingey House and Tingey Gate at the Washington Navy Yard, and Tingey Street SE, which leads to the gate, in Washington, D.C.

== See also ==
- United States v. Tingey, 30 U.S. 115 (1831) – a U.S. Supreme Court case in which Tingey was a party, though he died before the decision

== Sources ==
- Brown, Gordon S. (2011). The Captain Who Burned His Ships: Captain Thomas Tingey, USN, 1750–1829. Annapolis: Naval Institute Press.
