= Officers Quarters, Washington Navy Yard =

- Quarters A, Washington Navy Yard
- U.S. National Register of Historic Places
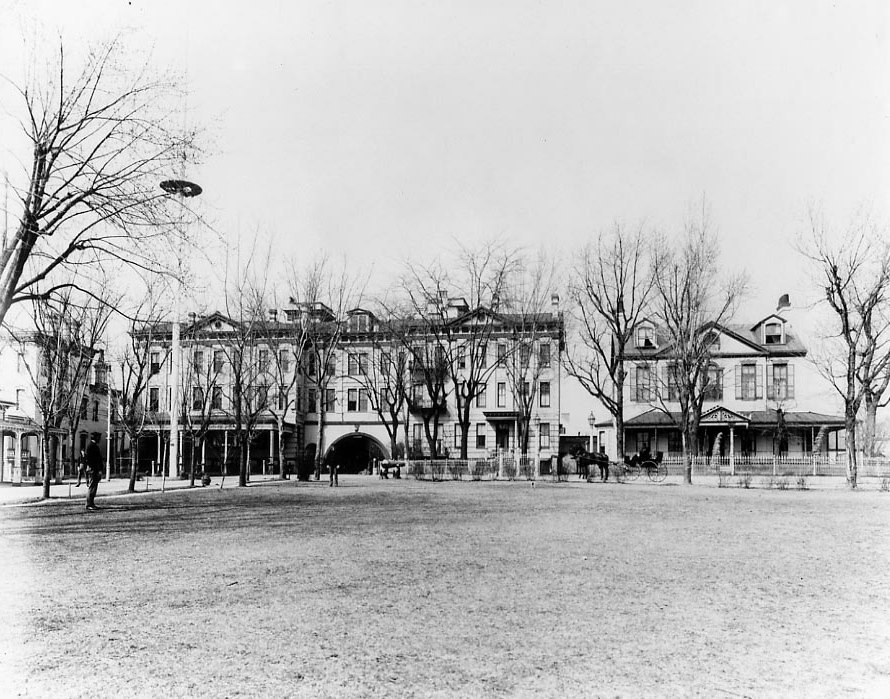
- Quarters A and the Latrobe Gate (left) c1900

- Location within the District of Columbia Location within the United States
- Location: E of Main Gate and S of M St., SE., in the Navy Yard, Washington, District of Columbia
- Coordinates: 38°52′34″N 76°59′41″W
- Area: less than one acre
- Built: 1804
- Architectural style: Georgian
- NRHP reference No.: 73002111
- Added to NRHP: August 14, 1973

- Quarters B, Washington Navy Yard
- U.S. National Register of Historic Places
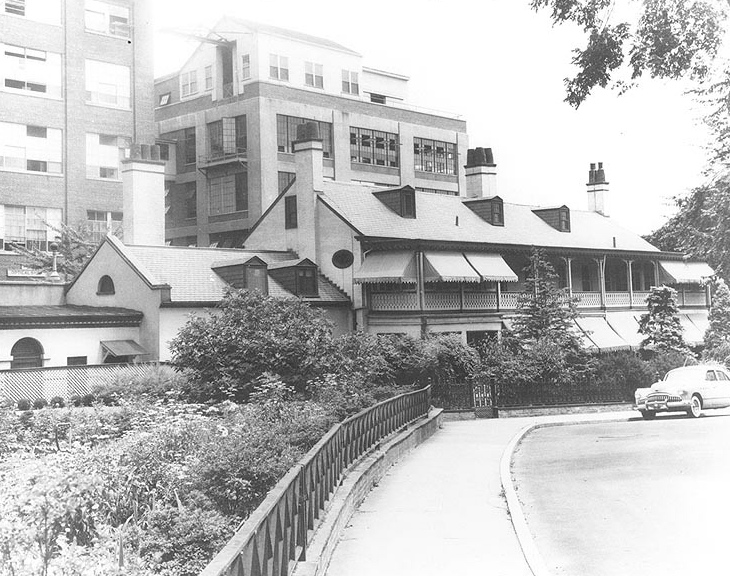
- Quarters B, c1950

- Location within the District of Columbia Location within the United States
- Location: Charles Morris Ave., SE., Washington, District of Columbia
- Area: less than one acre
- Built: 1801
- Architectural style: Federal
- NRHP reference No.: 73002112
- Added to NRHP: August 14, 1973

The Officers Quarters are fifteen residences located in eight historic buildings in the Washington Navy Yard. Each individual residence is labelled with a single letter such as Quarters A or Quarters B. They were built at different times but continue to serve as housing for senior officers of the United States Navy.

== Quarters A ==
This house, also known as Tingey House, was built around 1804 and was the home of the Commandant of the Navy Yard. It was named after the first Commandant, Captain Thomas Tingey. It is possible that the 2-story brick building was designed by Lovering and Dyer. Unlike most government buildings, it was not seriously damaged during the 1814 Burning of Washington. In 1977, it became the official home of the Chief of Naval Operations.

== Quarters B ==
The first of the quarters to be built in 1801, this housed the second in command of the Yard. As with Quarters A, it was looted but not damaged during the 1814 Burning of Washington.

== Quarters C and D ==
Built in 1878 on top of the former reservoir, these two residences in a three-story brick building housed the Naval Constructor and the Civil Engineer.

== Quarters E, F and G ==
Built around 1837, this building housed the Master of the Yard, the Surgeon, and a Lieutenant. It was smaller than normal for officers of this rank.

== Quarters H ==
Built sometime before 1824, the Gunner quarters were built against the wall separating the Yard from M street. The building was expanded and repaired throughout the late 1800s.

== Quarters K, L and M ==
An octagon building originally built for muster calls, it was modified to house three residences in 1889.

== Quarters N, O ==
Originally a paint shop built in 1865, which also served as a museum, this building was remodeled into two residences in 1891.

== Quarters P, Q ==
Standing next to the Latrobe Gate and the Marine barracks, this building housed the ranking Marine officer in charge of the guard. The building was added to and repaired throughout the late 1800s.
