= Seafarers Yacht Club =

- U.S. National Register of Historic Places
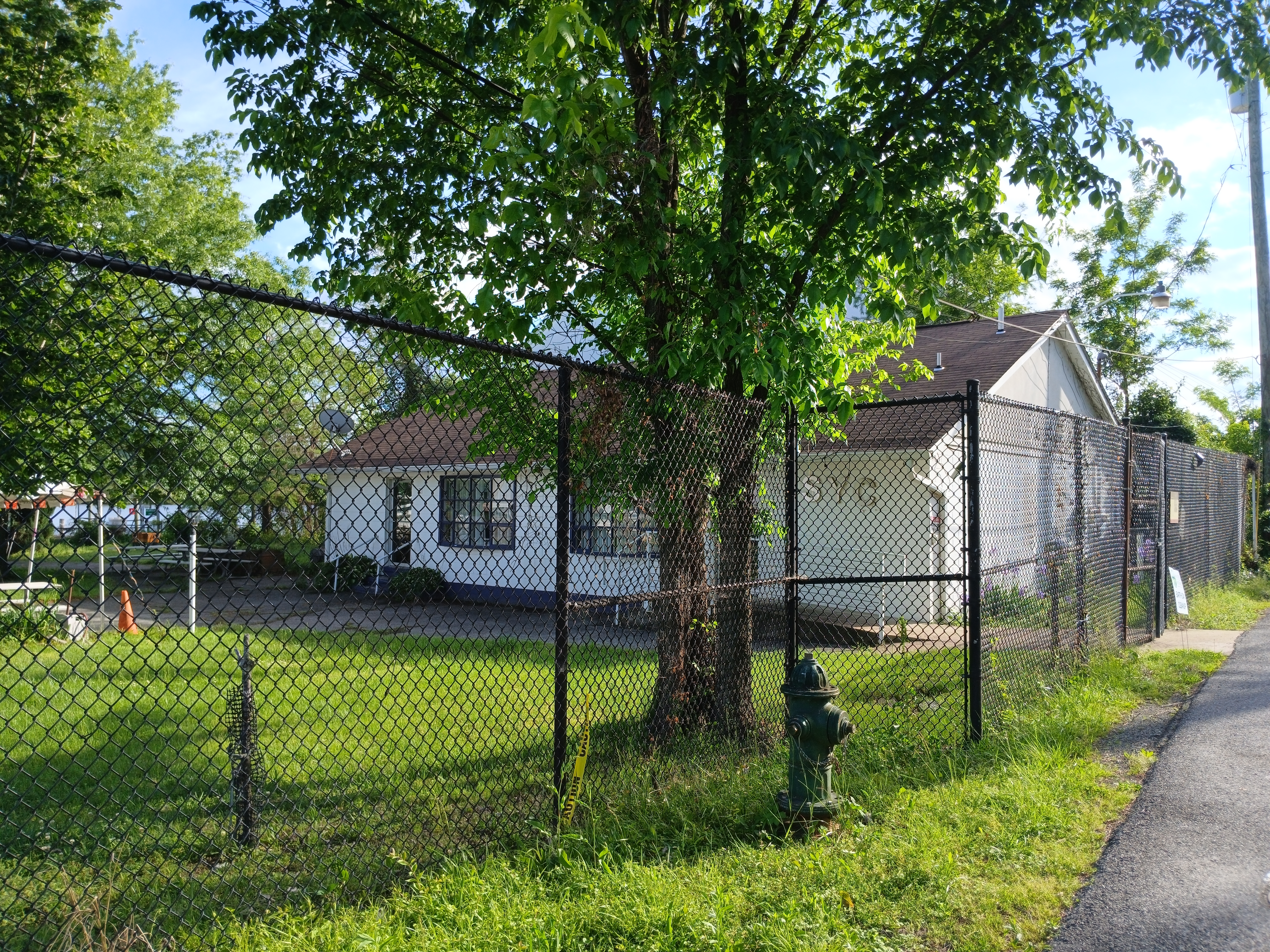
- The clubhouse seen through the perimeter fence, May 2025

- Location within District of Columbia Location within the United States
- Location: 1950 M Street, S.E., Washington, D.C.
- Coordinates: 38°52′45″N 76°58′29″W
- Built: 1964
- NRHP reference No.: 100007666
- Added to NRHP: May 2, 2022

The Seafarers Yacht Club, originally known as the Seafarers Boat Club, is a boating club on the Anacostia River in Washington, D.C. It has been identified as one of the oldest Black boating clubs in the United States.

In 2022, its clubhouse at 1950 M Street SE was listed on the National Register of Historic Places.

== History ==
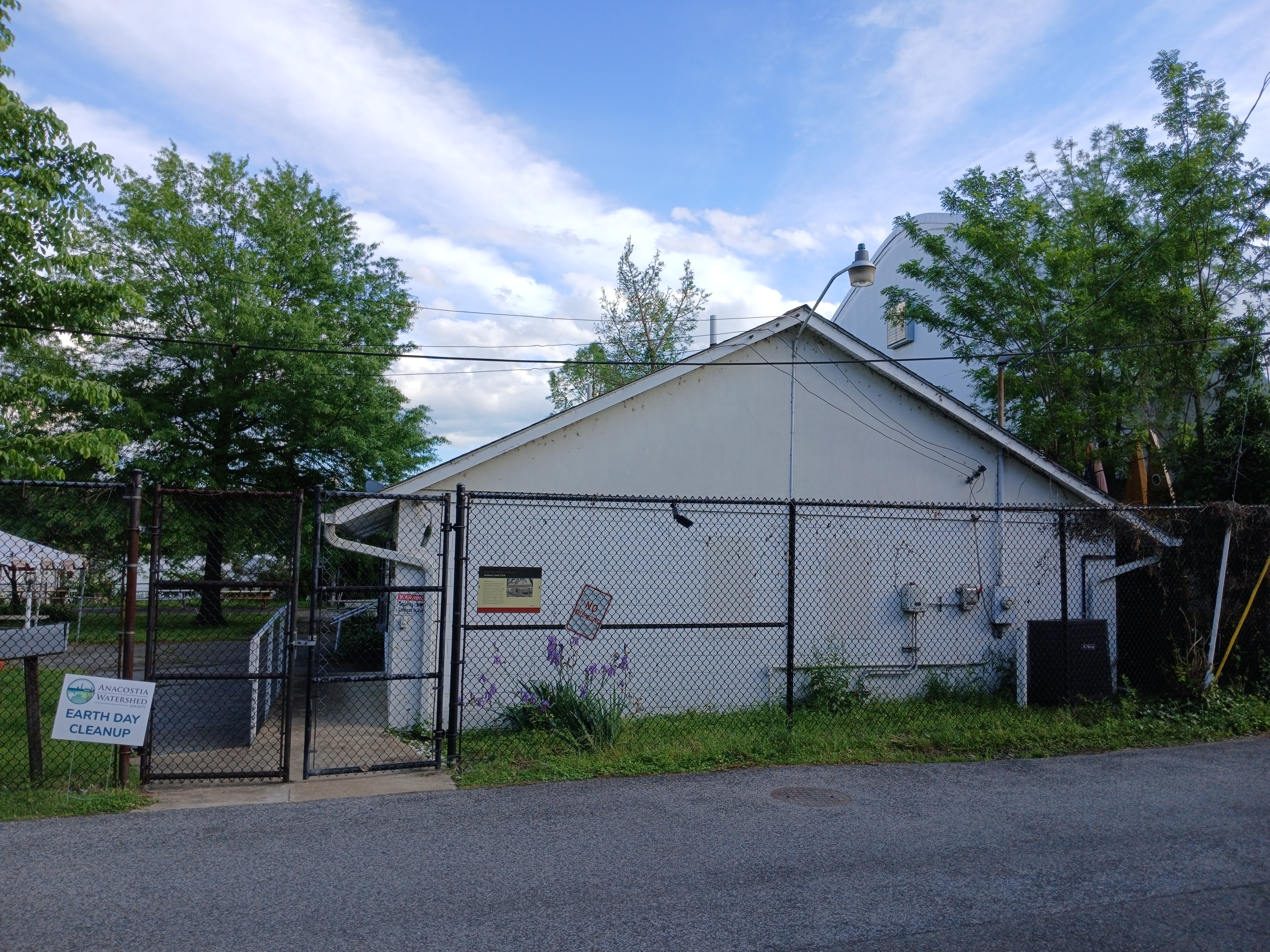
Back of the clubhouse in May 2025, seen through the perimeter fence; note the historic sign at the gate.

The Seafarers Boat Club was established in 1945 by Lewis Thomas Green, an African American public school teacher and boatbuilder in Washington, D.C. Seeking docking space and having been rejected by the whites-only boating clubs along the Anacostia River, Green worked with the civil rights leader Mary McLeod Bethune to lease a spot on the river from the U.S. Department of the Interior. The hard-won lease at 1950 M Street SE, between the Anacostia Railroad Bridge and John Philip Sousa Bridge on what some described as "one of the worst pieces of land along the riverbank," began in February 1947.

After growing throughout the 1950s, the yacht club saw membership decline due to increasing pollution of the Anacostia River. In the mid-1960s, it merged with D.C. Mariners, another African American club founded by Green's former student Charles Martin, under the name Seafarers Yacht Club. Green sold the land to this new organization.

In 1964, the Seafarers Yacht Club built a new clubhouse, where members could gather and host social events, as well as a new wheelhouse. Martin, with the help of his friends and his son Chubby, built the clubhouse by hand. It features specially designed canted windows resembling a ship's pilothouse that look out onto the river.

The organization grew again, adding a Women's Auxiliary Club and Junior Boat Club, and it started participating in races around the region. In 1965, it became the first African American boating club to join the American Power Boat Association. To protect the future of the Anacostia River's Black boating clubs, in 1972 the Seafarers Yacht Club worked with Washington Yacht Club and others to found the Anacostia Boating Association.

In response to the river pollution that first threatened the club decades earlier, the organization established the now annual Anacostia River Cleanup Day in 1985. They view themselves as stewards of the polluted and often overlooked waterway, which has seen environmental improvements in recent years.

The Seafarers Yacht Club was the subject of a photography exhibition at the Phillips Collection in 2018. It is featured on both Cultural Tourism DC's African American Heritage Trail and the D.C. Preservation League's Civil Rights Trail.

== Present-day ==
The Seafarers Yacht Club had around 45 active members as of 2022. As of 2023, its commodore was Tony Ford. The organization aims to maintain a space for affordable boating in an increasingly gentrifying city.

In May 2022, its clubhouse, wheelhouse, and 1947 boat ramp were listed on the National Register of Historic Places, on the basis that "the club is emblematic of the nationwide struggle of African Americans for equal access to facilities and fair treatment."
