= Washington Yacht Club =

- U.S. National Register of Historic Places
- Sign at Washington Yacht Club, 2020

- Location within District of Columbia Location within the United States
- Location: 1500 M Street, S.E., Washington, D.C.
- Coordinates: 38°52′03″N 76°59′09″W
- Built: 1915
- NRHP reference No.: 100005305
- Added to NRHP: October 2, 2020

The Washington Yacht Club is a motorboating club on the Anacostia River in Washington, D.C.

Established in 1910, the group's clubhouse and surrounding property were listed on the National Register of Historic Places in 2020.

== History ==
The Washington Yacht Club was founded on April 27, 1910, by a group of motorboat enthusiasts. Its initial members were white residents of the area east of the Anacostia River in Washington, D.C. They were "proudly working class" boaters who often built their boats by hand. Samuel Masson was the club's founding commodore.

The organization was unusual among boating clubs in D.C. at the time for its sole focus on motorboats.

WYC was located at the bottom of Naylor Road SE from its founding until 1915, then relocated to near the Pennsylvania Avenue bridge pier, where they built a clubhouse. They were forced to move again in 1924, this time across from the east bank of the river to the west bank, settling at the club's current site at 1500 M St. SE. In early 1925, members towed the clubhouse across the river, where it stands to this day.

Besides the clubhouse, constructed in 1915, elements of the current site that are historically significant include a 1955 workshop, a 1920s electrical shed, and a portion of the Anacostia seawall.

Members of the yacht club served as on-call marine security during World War II. WYC members also contributed to environmental stewardship of the Anacostia River, reporting polluters and assisting with river cleanup from as early as 1923.

Nevertheless, the Anacostia became extremely polluted throughout the 1900s. Meanwhile, the city's racial layout shifted, with black residents increasingly shunted east of the river. John “Sonny” McLean became the first non-white member of the Washington Yacht Club in the 1970s. His membership was limited, however, as he was not allowed in the clubhouse except during important meetings and events. Subsequently, many white members left WYC in reaction to both the club's increasing African American membership and the high levels of river pollution. It has since been described as "one of the oldest African-American yacht clubs in the country," though it is open to members from all backgrounds.

Women also began to join as individual members in the 1970s. Peggy Appellis, the first female individual member, also became the club's first female commodore in 1977.

In 2011, a fire destroyed four boats at the club.

== Present day ==
The club sits along "Boathouse Row" in southeast Washington, within Anacostia Park. It is a member of the Historic Anacostia Boating Association.

Steve Ricks is the club's longtime commodore.

WYC applied for historic preservation status for its clubhouse and grounds, arguing, "The Washington Yacht Club clubhouse epitomizes not only the resilient spirit of Anacostia boating, but to some degree, that of people of Washington as well."

It was listed on the National Register of Historic Places on October 2, 2020.
