= Randle Highlands =

Coordinates: 38.87°N 76.9664°W

- Neighborhood of Washington, D.C.
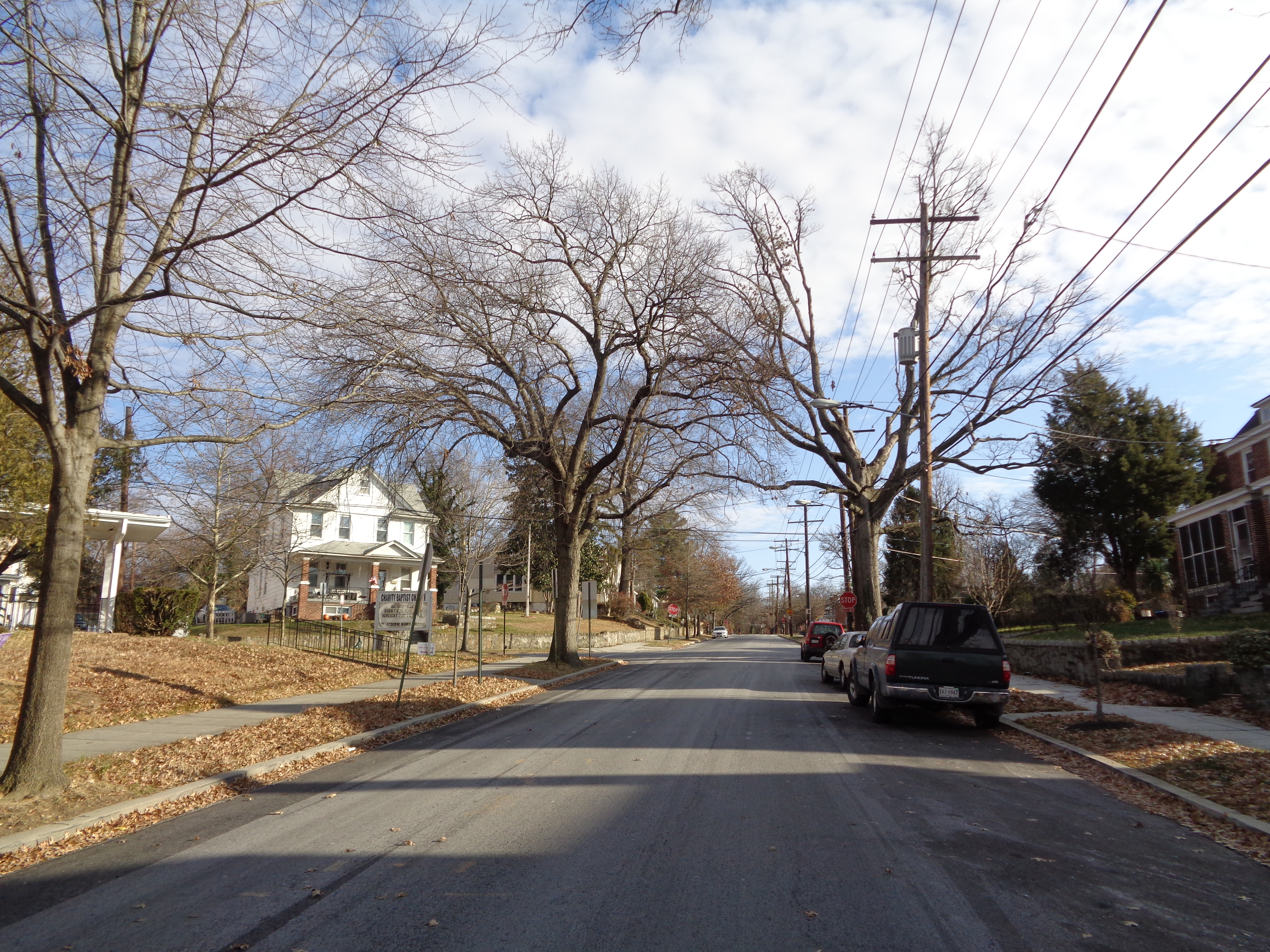
- The intersection of Naylor Rd. and 23rd St., SE, in Randle Highlands, December 2017

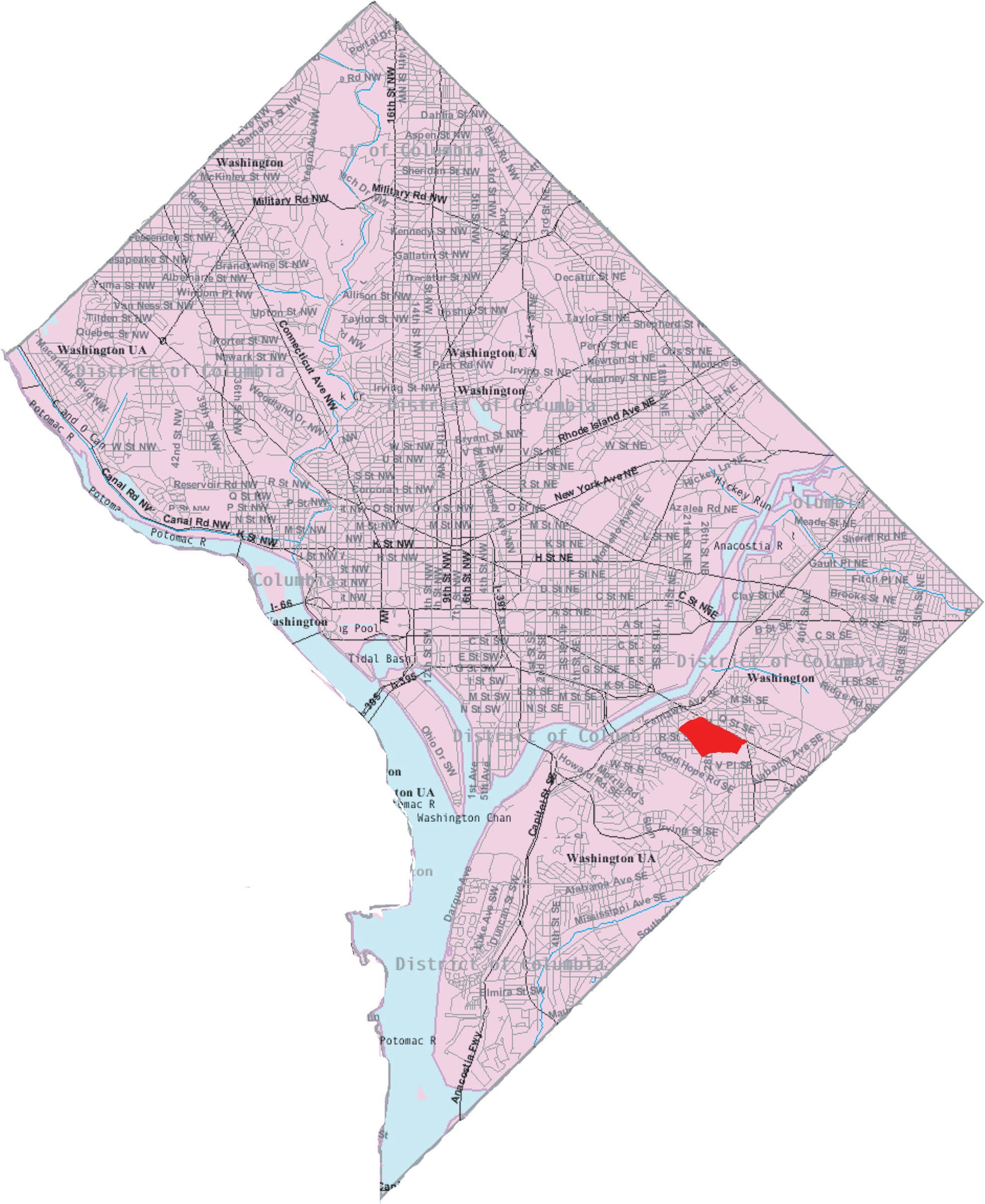
- Randle Highlands within the District of Columbia
- Country: United States
- District: Washington, D.C.
- Ward: Ward 7

Government
  - Councilmember: Wendell Felder

Randle Highlands is a neighborhood in Southeast Washington, D.C., east of the Anacostia River.

== History ==
Born in 1859, Colonel Arthur E. Randle was a late 19th- and early 20th-century real estate developer, who earned some recognition for building Congress Heights, and who later developed Hillcrest and other neighborhoods, east of the Anacostia River. Moving his family into a large, Greek Revival house - later nicknamed 'The Southeast White House' - in what is now the Randle Highlands neighborhood, Randle encouraged more Washingtonians to follow and build grand homes, along Pennsylvania Avenue.

== Transportation ==
The nearest Metrorail station to Randle Highlands is the Potomac Avenue Station, located on Pennsylvania Avenue about 1.5 miles west of Randle Highlands. Although the neighborhood is not directly served by a rail station, it is served by several Washington Metropolitan Area Transit Authority (WMATA) Metrobus lines, all of which stop at the Potomac Avenue Station.

Route	Name	Type	Western Terminus	Eastern Terminus	Randle Highlands Via	Eastbound Stops in Randle Highlands	Westbound Stops in Randle Highlands
30N	Friendship Heights-Southeast Line	Local	Friendship Heights Station	Naylor Road Station	Pennsylvania Avenue	27th Street, 30th Street, and 31st Street	31st Street, 30th Street, and 28th Street
30S	Friendship Heights-Southeast Line	Local	Friendship Heights Station	Southern Avenue Station	Naylor Road, 23rd & 25th Streets	Park Place, R Street, and S Street	S Street, R Street, and Q Street
32	Pennsylvania Avenue Line	Local	Potomac Park	Southern Avenue Station	Naylor Road, 23rd & 25th Streets	Park Place, R Street, and S Street	S Street, R Street, and Q Street
34	Pennsylvania Avenue Line	Local	Archives Station	Naylor Road Station	Naylor Road, 23rd & 25th Streets	Park Place, R Street, and S Street	S Street, R Street, and Q Street
36	Pennsylvania Avenue Line	Local	Potomac Park	Naylor Road Station	Pennsylvania Avenue	27th Street, 30th Street, and 31st Street	31st Street, 30th Street, and 28th Street
M6	Fairfax Village Line	Local	Potomac Avenue Station	Fairfax Village	Pennsylvania Avenue	27th Street, 30th Street, and 31st Street	31st Street, 30th Street, and 28th Street
39	Pennsylvania Avenue MetroExtra Line	Limited Stop	Potomac Park	Naylor Road Station	Pennsylvania Avenue	30th Street	30th Street

== Education ==
=== Elementary school ===
Randle Highlands Elementary School (1650 30th Street, S.E.) is the only school located within the Randle Highlands neighborhood. Most elementary age students living in Randle Highlands live in the Randle Highlands Elementary School district, however, some elementary students in Randle Highlands live in the Lawrence E. Boone Elementary School (2200 Minnesota Avenue, S.E.) district. The original school was built in 1911, then replaced by a newer building in 2002.

=== Middle school ===
Most middle school aged students in Randle Highlands live in the Sousa Middle School (3650 Ely Place, S.E.) district, however, some middle school students in Randle Highlands live in the Kramer Middle School (1700 Q Street, S.E.) district.

=== High school ===
All of Randle Highlands is in the Anacostia High School (1601 16th Street, S.E.) school district.

== Government & politics ==
=== Federal ===
Randle Highlands is located entirely within the borders of the District of Columbia, which means they do not have voting representation in Congress. However, the residents of the District of Columbia elect a non-voting delegate to congress as well as two Shadow Senators and a Shadow Representative who promote the interests of residents.

==== Current representation at the federal level ====
Name	Position	Party	Took office	Up for reelection
Eleanor Holmes Norton	Delegate	Democratic	1991	2024
Paul Strauss	Shadow Senator	Democratic	1997	2026
Michael Brown	Shadow Senator	Democratic	2007	2024
Oye Owolewa	Shadow Representative	Democratic	2021	2024

==== District ====
Randle Highlands is located primarily in Ward 7, although a small section of the westernmost portion of the neighborhood is located in Ward 8.

===== Current representation at the district level =====
Name	Position	Party	Took office	Up for reelection
Phil Mendelson	Chairman	Democratic	1999	2026
Christina Henderson	At-large	Independent	2021	2024
Kenyan McDuffie	At-large	Independent	2023	2026
Anita Bonds	At-large	Democratic	2012	2026
Robert White	At-large	Democratic	2016	2024
Wendell Felder	Ward 7	Democratic	2025	2029
Trayon White	Ward 8	Democratic	2017	2024

==== Local ====
In addition to the eight wards, the District of Columbia is divided into Advisory Neighborhood Commissions or ANCs, which are a non-partisan, neighborhood body composed of locally elected commissioners elected to two year terms from their ANC's single member district (SMD). While Randle Highland is primary in SMD 7B03, there is a small section of the neighborhood in SMD 7B02 as well as a small section in SMD 8A03.

===== Current representation at the local level =====
Name	Single Member District	Party
Travis R. Swanson	7B03	Non-Partisan
Jamaal Maurice Pearsall	7B02	Non-Partisan
Holly Muhammad	8A03	Non-Partisan

==== Civic association ====
Randle Highlands has an active civic association which meets on the 4th Thursday of each month at the D.C. Dream Center (2826 Q Street, S.E.).

== Boundaries ==
Randle Highlands is bounded by Pennsylvania Avenue SE to the north; Naylor Road, 27th Street, and Texas Avenue to the south; Fort Stanton Park to the southeast; and Minnesota Avenue to the west.
