= Latrobe Gate =

- Main Gate, Washington Navy Yard
- U.S. National Register of Historic Places
- U.S. National Historic Landmark District – Contributing property
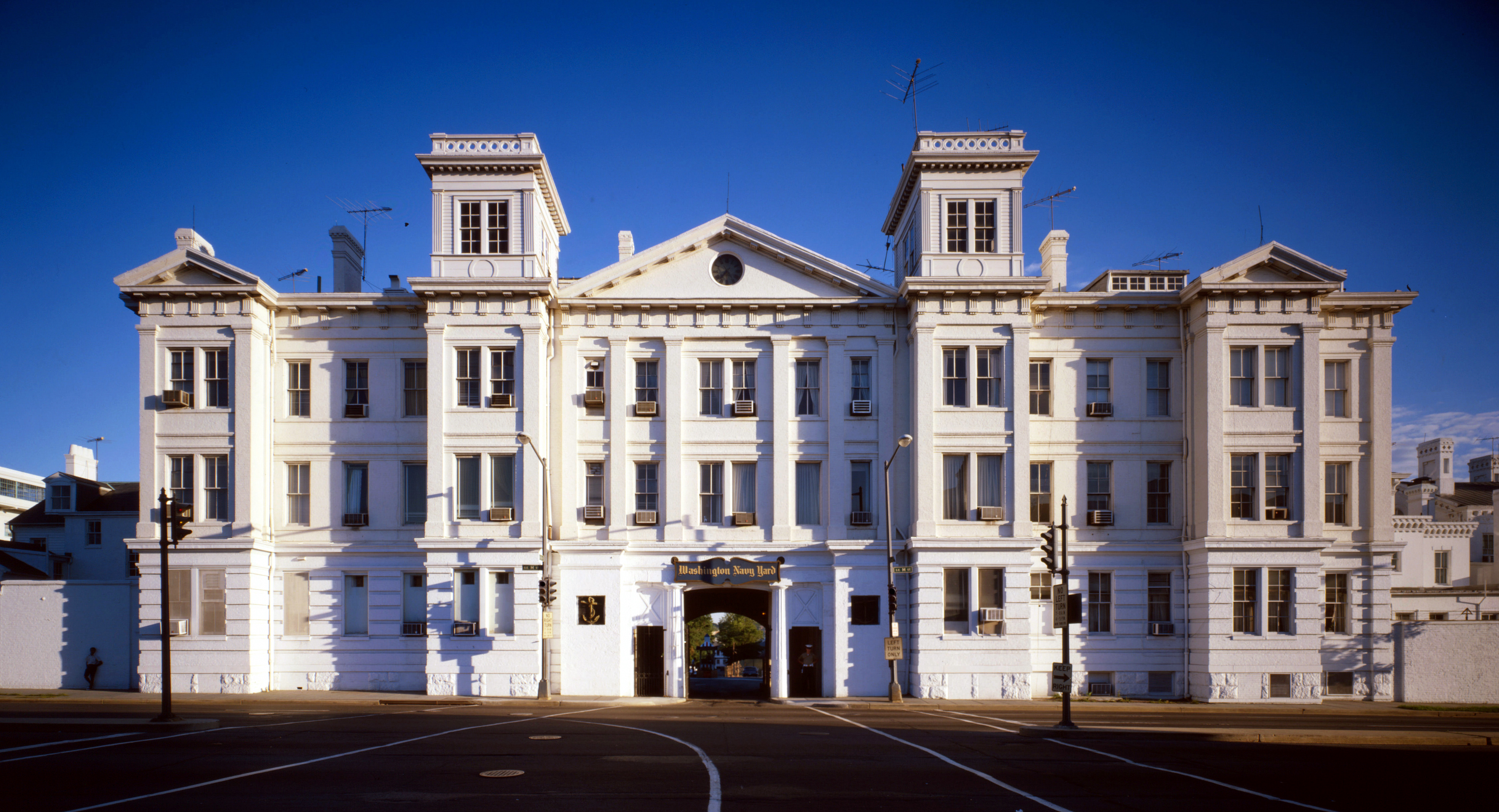
- Latrobe Gate in 1978

- Location within Washington, D.C.
- Location: 8th and M Street, SE; Washington, D.C. United States
- Coordinates: 38°52′35″N 76°59′43″W
- Built: 1806 (altered in 1881)
- Architect: Benjamin Henry Latrobe
- Architectural style: Greek Revival; Italianate
- NRHP reference No.: 73002098

Significant dates
- Added to NRHP: August 14, 1973
- Designated NHLDCP: June 19, 1973

The Latrobe Gate (also known as Main Gate, Washington Navy Yard) is a historic gatehouse located at the Washington Navy Yard in Southeast Washington, D.C. Built in 1806 and substantially altered in 1881, the ceremonial entrance to the U.S. Navy's oldest shore establishment is an example of Greek Revival and Italianate architecture. It was designed by the second Architect of the Capitol Benjamin Henry Latrobe, whose works include St. John's Episcopal Church, the Baltimore Basilica, and the United States Capitol. The Latrobe Gate is one of the nation's oldest extant examples of Greek Revival architecture. It was added to the National Register of Historic Places on August 14, 1973, and is a contributing property to the Washington Navy Yard's status as a National Historic Landmark.

== History ==
The Washington Navy Yard was established by an Act of Congress on July 23, 1799. Three years later, President Thomas Jefferson chose Latrobe to design a dry dock and ship repair facility for what was to become an active and strategically located naval yard. Although Congress rejected Latrobe's building plans, the architect was designated "Engineer of the Navy Department" in 1804. Plans for the Main Gate were approved by Secretary of the Navy Robert Smith in 1805, and construction lasted from that year until 1806. Latrobe's Greek Revival design was considered daring and thus criticized by traditionalist architects. William Thornton, the first Architect of the Capitol, described the gate as a "monument to bad taste and design". Thornton predicted that "not until extinction of time will such an arch ever be made again", but the Greek Revival style became popular with 19th-century American architects. The style was considered symbolic of the young nation's democracy, a political system that originated in Ancient Greece.

During the War of 1812, Washington, D.C., was invaded by British forces. The Navy Yard was a primary target during the attack, and was burned along with much of the city in 1814. The gate was one of only three structures at the Navy Yard not destroyed during the fire.

In 1881, a Marine barracks was constructed around and over the Main Gate. The brick, Italianate structure is two stories high above the gate and three stories high on each side of the gate. It is the oldest continuously manned Marine guardhouse in the United States. It is located four blocks south of the Marine Barracks Washington. The Marines manning the Latrobe Gate are responsible for raising and lowering the American flag outside the Chief of Naval Operations' (CNO's) house.

== See also ==
- List of works by Benjamin Henry Latrobe
- National Register of Historic Places listings in Washington, D.C.
