= Hillcrest School =

Hillcrest School may refer to:

== Australia ==
- Hillcrest Christian College, a private school in Reedy Creek, Australia
- Hillcrest Secondary College a public high school in Broadmeadows, Australia

== Canada ==
- Hillcrest Community School, in Toronto, Ontario
- Hillcrest School (Moncton), in Moncton, New Brunswick
- Hillcrest School, the former name of a school merged into Hillfield Strathallan College in Hamilton, Ontario
- Hillcrest Middle School, Peel District School Board
- Hillcrest School, Edmonton Founded in the 60s in Edmonton , Alberta

== Kenya ==
- Hillcrest School (Nairobi, Kenya)

== Nigeria ==
- Hillcrest School (Jos, Nigeria)

== United Kingdom ==
- Hillcrest School, Birmingham, a secondary school in Birmingham, West Midlands, England
- Hillcrest Grammar School, a former independent school in Davenport, Greater Manchester, England

== United States ==
- Hillcrest Christian School, a private school in Jackson, Mississippi, USA
- Hillcrest Lutheran Academy, a private school in Minnesota, United States
- Hillcrest Youth Correctional Facility, in Salem, Oregon, USA

== Zambia ==
- Hillcrest Technical Secondary School, a public high school in Livingstone, Zambia

== Zimbabwe ==
- Hillcrest Preparatory School, an independent co-educational school in Mutare

== See also ==
- Hillcrest Elementary School (disambiguation)
- Hillcrest High School (disambiguation)
- Hillcrest (disambiguation)
