= Fairlawn (Washington, D.C.) =

- Neighborhood
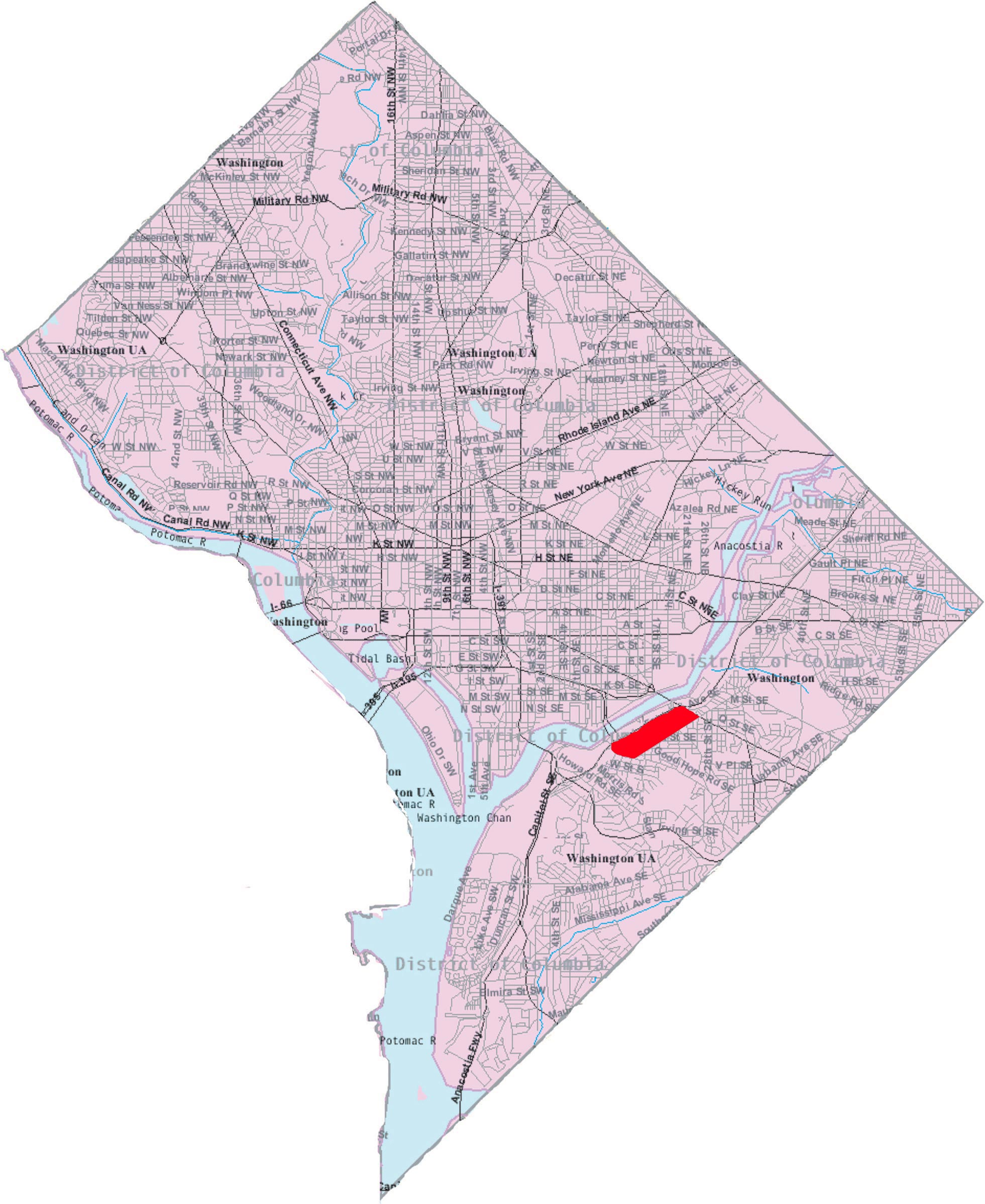
- Map of Washington, D.C., with the Fairlawn neighborhood highlighted in red
- Coordinates: 38°52′15″N 076°58′44″W
- Country: United States
- Territory: Washington, D.C.
- Ward: Ward 8

Government
  - Councilmember: Trayon White

Fairlawn is a working class and middle class residential neighborhood in southeast Washington, D.C., United States. It is bounded by Interstate 295, Pennsylvania Avenue SE, Minnesota Avenue SE (between Pennsylvania Avenue SE and Naylor Road SE), Naylor Road SE (between Minnesota Avenue SE Good Hope Road SE), and Good Hope Road SE.

== History ==
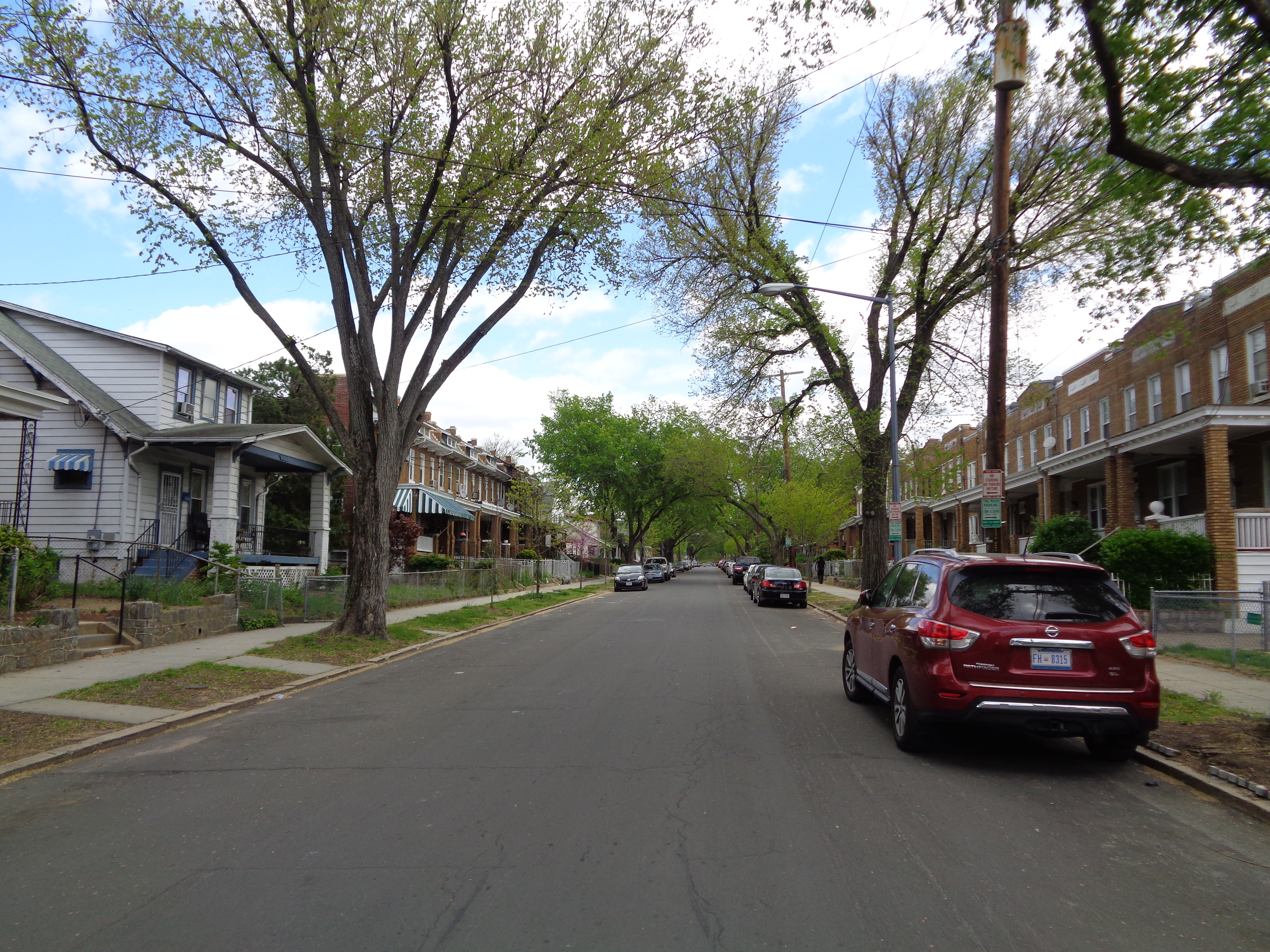
The Fairlawn neighborhood at the intersection of S st and 14th St SE in April 2018

The Nacotchtank Native Americans were the first settlers to inhabit the area now known as Fairlawn, living and fishing along the nearby Anacostia River. Captain John Smith was the first European to visit the region in A.D. 1612, naming the river the "Nacotchtank". War and disease decimated the Nacochtank, and during the last 25 years of the 17th century the tribe ceased to exist as a functional unit and its few remaining members merged with other local Piscataway tribes.

European settlement in Southeast Washington first occurred in 1662 at Blue Plains (now the site of the city's sewage treatment plant just to the west of the modern neighborhood of Bellevue), and at St. Elizabeth (now the site of St. Elizabeths Hospital psychiatric hospital) and Giesborough (now called Barry Farm) in 1663. In 1663, Lord Baltimore granted ownership of the majority of the area on the south bank of the Anacostia River to George Thompson.

The area became part of the District of Columbia in 1791. Congress passed the Residence Act of 1790 to establish a federally owned district in which would be built the new national capital, and George Washington picked the current site in 1791 (a choice ratified by Congress later that year). William Marbury, a wealthy Georgetown merchant who later was a party in the landmark Marbury v. Madison Supreme Court case, purchased much of the "Chichester tract" some time in the late 18th or early 19th century.

The growth of the Washington Navy Yard created the need to provide housing for the many new employees working at the facility, but little land was available for new construction in the area and housing prices were high. Consequently, in 1818, the privately owned "Upper Navy Yard Bridge" was built over the Anacostia River at 11th Street SE. This toll bridge was designed to permit easy access to Anacostia so that housing could be constructed on the eastern shore of the Anacostia River. A road was built from the bridge to the town of Upper Marlboro, Maryland, and named Upper Marlborough Road (called Good Hope Road SE today), while another road ran roughly parallel to the river and was named Piscataway Road (then in the late 19th century "Asylum Road" and in the 20th century "Nichols Avenue", and is now Martin Luther King, Jr. Avenue SE).

In the late 1820s or early 1830s, Marbury sold his land to Enoch Tucker, a farmer who rented out part of the land to tenant farmers and built his home near the intersection of Upper Marlborough Road and Piscataway Road. Developers John Dobler, John Fox, and John W. Van Hook purchased the 240-acre (97.2 hectare) area immediately southwest of Fairlawn from Enoch Tucker on June 5, 1854, for $19,000 and immediately subdivided the property into lots for houses. Naming the area Uniontown (it is the neighborhood of Anacostia today), the development became Washington's first "suburban" community. Van Hook (the lead developer) renamed streets in the area after former presidents: Upper Marlborough Road was now called "Harrison Street," and Piscataway Road now known as "Monroe Street".

Dr. Arthur Christie, a wealthy Englishman, purchased 50 acres (20.25 hectares) of land on the north side of Harrison Street (now the lower portion of Good Hope Road SE) and named his estate Fairlawn. The Fairlawn neighborhood derives its name from Christie's estate.

Racially restrictive covenants were used in early 20th century Fairlawn to keep the neighborhood exclusively white. A Washington Times real estate advertisement from October 1911 listed "NO NEGROES" as one of the neighborhood's supposed "advantages".

Fairlawn remained largely undeveloped farm and woodland until 1940. Uniontown/Anacostia, Barry Farm, Congress Heights, and Randle Highlands were the focus of most housing and retail development. Even these communities remained isolated from one another, and most of the land between them was forest until World War II. The oppressive need for housing during the war, brought about by a massive influx of federal workers to the capital, led to extensive building of homes in Fairlawn and the linking of the neighborhood with other parts of southeast D.C.

The southern part of the Washington Metro's Green Line was originally designed to pass over the 11th Street Bridges to the intersection of Good Hope Road SE and Martin Luther King, Jr. Avenue SE. The site of the Anacostia Metro station at this intersection led to concerns that the Metro station would destroy the character of historic Anacostia and Fairlawn, and after pressure from the federal government Metro moved the site of the station to its current location on Howard Road SE.

== Notable establishments and place names in Fairlawn ==
Two public schools, Anacostia Senior High School and Kramer Middle School, are located in Fairlawn. Naylor Road School, a private school (grades K through 8), is also in the neighborhood. The Anacostia Branch of the District of Columbia Public Library is located in Fairlawn at 1800 Good Hope Road SE.

The large Marbury Plaza apartment building complex (2300 and 2330 Good Hope Road SE) in the Fairlawn neighborhood is named for William Marbury. Naylor Road SE is named for the Naylor family, whose farm constituted much of southern and southeastern portion of Fairlawn. Good Hope Road SE is named for the town of Good Hope, D.C., founded in 1820 around a tavern located near the current intersection of Good Hope Road SE and Alabama Avenue SE.

The Anacostia Gateway building (1800 Martin Luther King, Jr. Avenue SE) was built by the District of Columbia in Fairlawn at the intersection of Martin Luther King, Jr. Avenue SE and Good Hope Road SE. As of January 2010, it houses the D.C. Department of Housing and Economic Development. The Anacostia Gateway building will be a terminus of the Anacostia Line of the DC Streetcar trolley system, under construction as of December 2009.

The easternmost portion of Fort Dupont Park runs along T Street SE, Naylor Road SE, and Altamont Place SE in the Fairlawn area. The park adjoins Fort Stanton Park at Good Hope Road SE.
