= Hillcrest =

Hillcrest may refer to:

== Places ==
=== Australia ===
- Hillcrest, Queensland, a suburb of Logan City
- Hillcrest, South Australia, suburb of Adelaide
- Hillcrest, Tasmania, suburb of Burnie

=== Canada ===
- Hillcrest, Alberta, also known as Hillcrest Mines
- Hillcrest, Norfolk County, Ontario, an unincorporated community
- Hillcrest, Prince Edward County, Ontario, an unincorporated community
- Bracondale Hill, Toronto, Ontario, a neighbourhood in Old Toronto also known as Hillcrest
- Hillcrest, Toronto, Ontario, a neighbourhood in North York

=== Ireland ===
- Hillcrest, Lucan Housing estate in Lucan, Co. Dublin

=== Malaysia ===
- Sekolah Menengah Kebangsaan Hillcrest, Batu Caves, Malaysia
- Hillcrest Residence, Penang
- Hillcrest Gardens, Puchong

=== New Zealand ===
- Hillcrest, Auckland, a suburb of Auckland
- Hillcrest, Waikato, a suburb of Hamilton

=== South Africa ===
- Hillcrest, KwaZulu-Natal, a suburb of eThekwini in KwaZulu-Natal
- Hillcrest, Pretoria, a suburb of Pretoria

=== United States ===
(by state then city)

- Hillcrest, Little Rock, Arkansas, a neighborhood in Little Rock
- In California,
  - Hillcrest, Kern County, California
  - Hillcrest, Los Angeles County, California, a place in California
  - Hillcrest, San Diego, California, a neighborhood
  - Hillcrest, Shasta County, California, a place in California
- Hillcrest, Delaware, an unincorporated community
- Hillcrest Heights, Florida, a town in the United States
- Hillcrest (Cochran, Georgia), listed on the National Register of Historic Places (NRHP) in Georgia
- Hillcrest, Illinois, a village
- Hillcrest (Anchorage, Kentucky), listed on the NRHP in Kentucky
- Hillcrest Heights, Maryland, a place in the United States
- Hillcrest, Michigan, an unincorporated community
- Hillcrest, Paterson, New Jersey, a neighborhood
- Hillcrest, Trenton, New Jersey, a neighborhood
- Hillcrest (Cazenovia, New York), listed on the NRHP in New York
- Hillcrest, Broome County, New York
- Hillcrest, Rockland County, New York
- Hillcrest (Lima, New York), listed on the NRHP in New York
- Hillcrest, Queens, New York, a neighborhood in New York City
- Hillcrest, Rockland County, New York, a hamlet
- Hillcrest Apartments, public housing in Asheville, NC
- Hillcrest, Ohio, an unincorporated community
- Hillcrest, Texas, a village
- Hillcrest, Virginia, an unincorporated community
- Hillcrest, Washington, D.C., a neighborhood in southeast Washington, D.C.
- Hillcrest, West Virginia
- Hillcrest, Wisconsin, an unincorporated community

=== Zimbabwe ===
- Hillcrest, Bulawayo, a suburb of Bulawayo

== See also ==
- Hillcrest, a rock band from New Britain, CT
- Hillcrest Complex, the Toronto Transit Commission's largest facility
- Hillcrest Country Club (disambiguation), several places
- Hillcrest Honors Community, a residence hall at Virginia Polytechnic Institute and State University in the United States
- Hillcrest Hospital, a branch hospital of the Cleveland Clinic in Mayfield Heights, OH
- Hillcrest Labs, the company that invented Freespace motion control technology
- Hillcrest mine disaster, a coal mining accident in Canada
- Hillcrest Park, in Vancouver, Canada
- Hillcrest Village, in Toronto, Canada
- Rosemarie Hillcrest, an English model best known as Playboy's Miss October 1964
- UC San Diego Medical Center, Hillcrest, a hospital in San Diego, California
