= Anacostia Historic District =

Historic district in Washington, D.C., United States

- U.S. National Register of Historic Places
- U.S. Historic district
- D.C. Inventory of Historic Sites
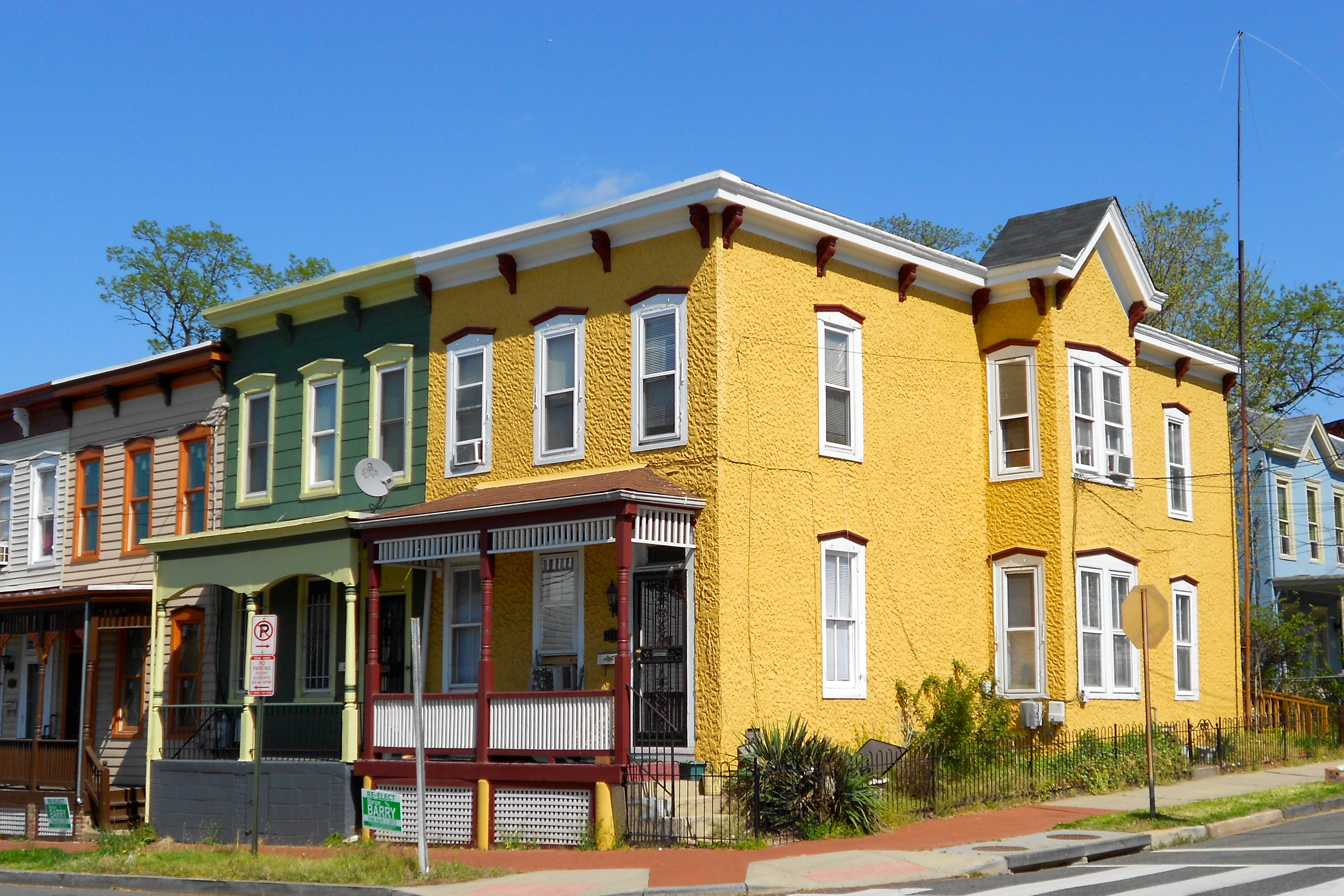
- Houses at 13th and W Streets

- Location within the District of Columbia Location within the United States
- Location: Roughly bounded by Marion Barry Ave SE., 16th St., Mapleview, Washington, District of Columbia
- Area: 83 acres (34 ha)
- Built: 1854
- Architectural style: Italianate, Cottage style
- NRHP reference No.: 78003050

Significant dates
- Added to NRHP: October 11, 1978
- Designated DCIHS: November 27, 1973

The Anacostia Historic District is a historic district in the city of Washington, D.C. in the United States, comprising approximately 20 squares and about 550 buildings built between 1854 and 1930. The Anacostia Historic District was added to the National Register of Historic Places in 1978. "The architectural character of the Anacostia area is unique in Washington. Nowhere else in the District of Columbia does there exist such a collection of late-19th and early-20th century small-scale frame and brick working-class housing."

The historic district is roughly bounded by:

- Martin Luther King, Jr. Avenue SE between Marion Barry Ave SE and Morris Road SE;
- Marion Barry Ave SE from Martin Luther King, Jr. Avenue SE to Fendall Street SE;
- Fendall Street SE from Marion Barry Ave SE to V Street SE;
- V Street SE between Fendall Street SE and 15th Street SE;
- 15th Street SE from V Street SE, along the eastern and southern sides of the Frederick Douglass National Historic Site to High Street SE;
- High Street SE from 14th Street SE to Maple View Place SE; and
- Maple View Place SE between High Street SE and Martin Luther King, Jr. Avenue SE.

Buildings within the Anacostia Historic District are generally two-story brick and wood-frame structures. The houses are primarily wood-frame construction, mostly in the Italianate, Cottage, and Washington Row House architectural styles (although there are some homes in the Queen Anne style). Cottage-style buildings tend to have been built earlier, with Italianate structures more popular after 1870. Queen Anne–style homes tend to be clustered in Griswold's subdivision. Many of the homes feature large lawns and wrap-around porches.

== History of the district ==
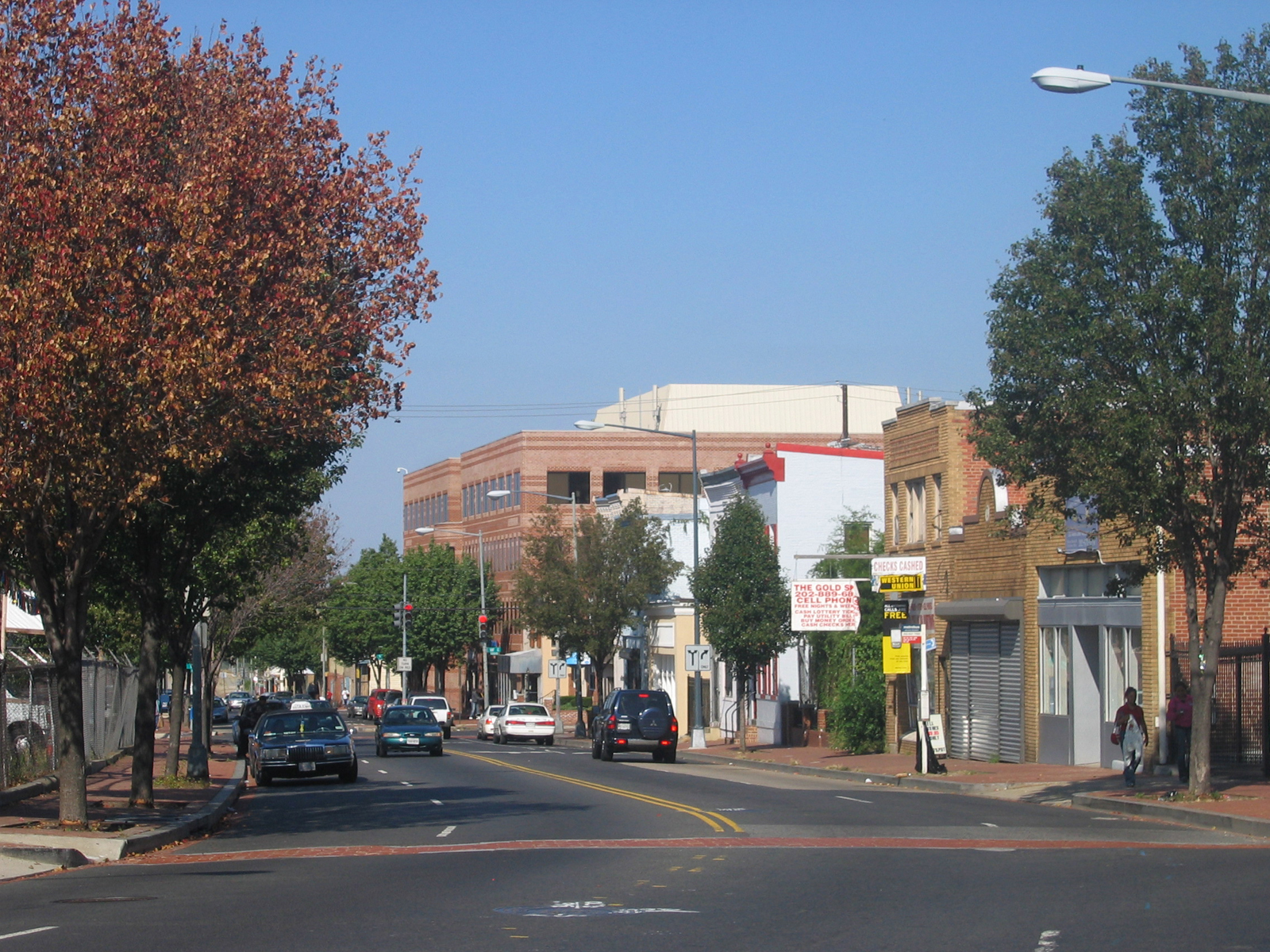
Looking north on Martin Luther King, Jr. Avenue SE (formerly Piscataway Road and Nicholls Avenue SE) in the Anacostia Historic District.

The Nacotchtank Native Americans were the first settlers to inhabit the area now known as Anacostia, living and fishing along the Anacostia River. Captain John Smith was the first European to visit the region in 1612, naming the river the "Nacotchtank". Henry Fleet (an English explorer kidnapped for five years by the Nacotchtank beginning in 1621) and Leonard Calvert (later Governor of the Province of Maryland) gave the area its more etymologically correct name, "Anacostine," from which the modern name of Anacostia is derived. The name means "trading village." The Nacochtank villages which dotted the south side of the Anacostia River were busy trading sites for Native Americans in the region. War and disease decimated the Nacochtank. During the last 25 years of the 17th century, the tribe ceased to exist as a functional unit, and its few remaining members merged with other local Piscataway tribes.

European settlement first occurred in the area in 1662 at Blue Plains (now the site of the city's sewage treatment plant just to the west of the modern neighborhood of Bellevue), and at St. Elizabeth (now the site of St. Elizabeths Hospital psychiatric hospital) and Giesborough (now called Barry Farm) in 1663. In 1663, Lord Baltimore granted ownership of the majority of the area on the south bank of the Anacostia River to George Thompson. Slightly inland, Lord Baltimore granted another large tract (known as Chichester) to John Meeks in 1664. "Anacostia Fort" was built on the heights at the present-day neighborhood of Skyland sometime in the 18th century.

The area became part of the District of Columbia in 1791. Congress passed the Residence Act of 1790 to establish a federally-owned district in which would be built the new national capital, and George Washington picked the current site in 1791 (a choice ratified by Congress later that year). In 1795, real estate speculator James Greenleaf purchased most of what is now the Anacostia Historic District from the federal government. Although Greenleaf was bankrupted in the Panic of 1796–1797, a few homes dotted the shores of the eastern bank of Anacostia River in what is now the historic district. William Marbury, a wealthy Georgetown merchant who later was a party in the landmark Marbury v. Madison Supreme Court case, purchased much of the land that is now the Anacostia Historic District some time in the late 18th century or early 19th century.

The first permanent modern settlement of size in the Anacostia Historic District came in 1820. The growth of the Washington Navy Yard created the need to provide housing for the many new employees working there. Still, little land was available for new construction in the area, and housing prices were high. Consequently, in 1818, the privately owned "Upper Navy Yard Bridge" was built over the Anacostia River at 11th Street SE. A toll bridge, this bridge was designed to permit easy access to Anacostia so that housing could be constructed on the eastern shore of the Anacostia River. Before the construction of this bridge and others upstream, there were no mudflats along the banks of the Anacostia. The bridges shifted currents and slowed the river's flow, and within a decade, extensive flats had built up along the shore. In 1820, the town of Good Hope, D.C., was founded around a tavern located near the current intersection of Good Hope Road SE and Alabama Avenue SE (forming the current neighborhood of Good Hope). Businesses began to construct buildings along Upper Marlborough Road (called Good Hope Road SE today) toward the village of Good Hope, forming the Anacostia Business District. In the late 1820s or early 1830s, Marbury sold his land to Enoch Tucker, who rented out part of the land to tenant farmers and built his home near the intersection of Upper Marlborough Road and Piscataway Road (now Martin Luther King, Jr. Avenue SE). A post office was established in the area and named Good Hope Station. In 1849, the post office's name was changed to Anacostia.

=== Uniontown ===
Developers John Dobler, John Fox, and John W. Van Hook purchased the 240-acre (97.2-hectare) area known as Anacostia from Enoch Tucker on June 5, 1854, for $19,000 and immediately subdivided the property into lots for houses. Fox had built a mansion on Jefferson Street (now W Street SE) some years before, and Fox and Van Hook were business partners in the Union Land Association. Naming the area Uniontown, the development became Washington's first "suburban" community. Van Hook (the lead developer) renamed streets in the area after former presidents: Upper Marlborough Road was now called "Harrison Street," and Piscataway Road, now known as "Monroe Street". The area between Monroe Street and the Anacostia River was known as the Duvall subdivision, and Duvall's Tavern (a well-known bar) stood there. Half the lots sold within two months of the first sale. Restrictive covenants prohibited the sale or lease of property to anyone of African descent, Mulattoes, or Irish. The main street in the 17-block subdivision (bordered by Martin Luther King, Jr. Avenue SE, Good Hope Road SE, 16th Street SE, and W Street SE) was 14th Street SE, which had a central market and a 40-foot (12.2 meter) wide boulevard running down the center of it.

The first house erected in the new subdivision was a two-story brick building on Harrison Street (on the southwest corner of Harrison and Monroe Streets), and next to it on Monroe Street (on the site of the former Enoch Tucker farmhouse) rose a brick structure which held George F. Pyle's grocery store. In 1855, Van Hook himself built "Cedar Hill", a lavish mansion on Jefferson Street near the Fox Mansion. Dr. Arthur Christie, a wealthy Englishman, purchased 50 acres (20.25 hectares) of land on the north side of Harrison Street and named his estate Fairlawn. Lewin Talburtt built a spectacular 21-room mansion, "Mont View," on what is now Mount View Place SE; his son, George Washington Talburtt, lived there for many years (although it is an apocryphal story that John Howard Payne composed the song Home! Sweet Home! there). The first church in the area, the Episcopalian "Ryan's Chapel," opened in 1862.

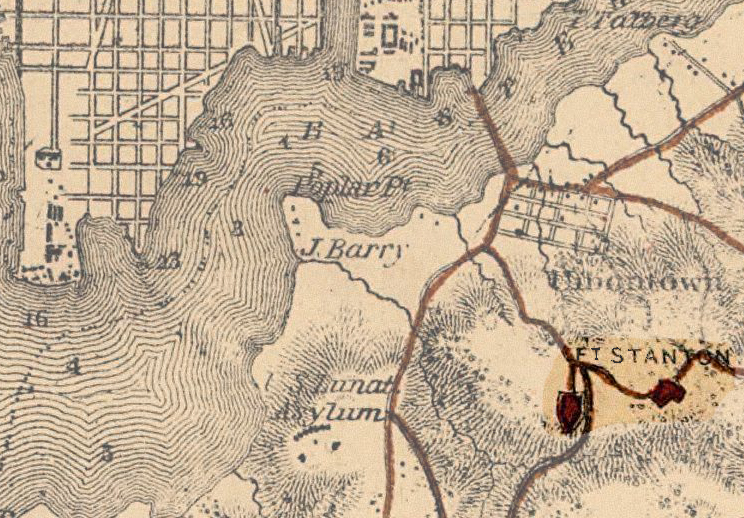
Uniontown in 1865, showing Fort Stanton, Barry Farm, and St. Elizabeths Lunatic Asylum.

Van Hook had hoped to attract Navy Yard workers to buy and build in the Uniontown development. But although most of the lots had sold by 1860, the Panic of 1857 and the Civil War hindered building and few houses were constructed. The Civil War itself brought many changes to the area encompassed by the Anacostia Historic District. After the First Battle of Bull Run, Northern military leaders realized Washington, D.C., was relatively undefended and quickly began building a ring of forts around the city. The first of these forts was Fort Stanton, which began construction in September 1861, was completed on October 22, and fully armed and staffed by December 25. Fort Stanton was built on "Garfield Heights" (now Fort Stanton Park), and a military road (now Morris Road SE, Erie Street SE, Fort Place SE, Bruce Place SE, and Ainger Place SE) constructed from Monroe Street to provide better access to the river and Navy Yard Bridge (11th Street Bridges) and to link Fort Stanton with its subsidiary batteries, Fort Ricketts and Fort Snyder, and nearby Fort Wagner (now the site of Stanton Elementary School). The area was officially named Uniontown in 1865, but there was so much confusion between the village and Uniontown, Pennsylvania, that the name of the area reverted to Anacostia on April 22, 1866. Fort Stanton closed in April 1866, and the land it occupied was turned back over to private ownership. The structures of the fort itself remained, falling into decay.

The Union Land Association went bankrupt in the Panic of 1873, and Van Hook was forced to sell Cedar Hill. The mansion was purchased by Frederick Douglass in 1877, who defied the whites-only covenant governing the subdivision in buying the property. The 1880 census shows that about 15 percent of Uniontown's residents were African American.

=== Later development ===
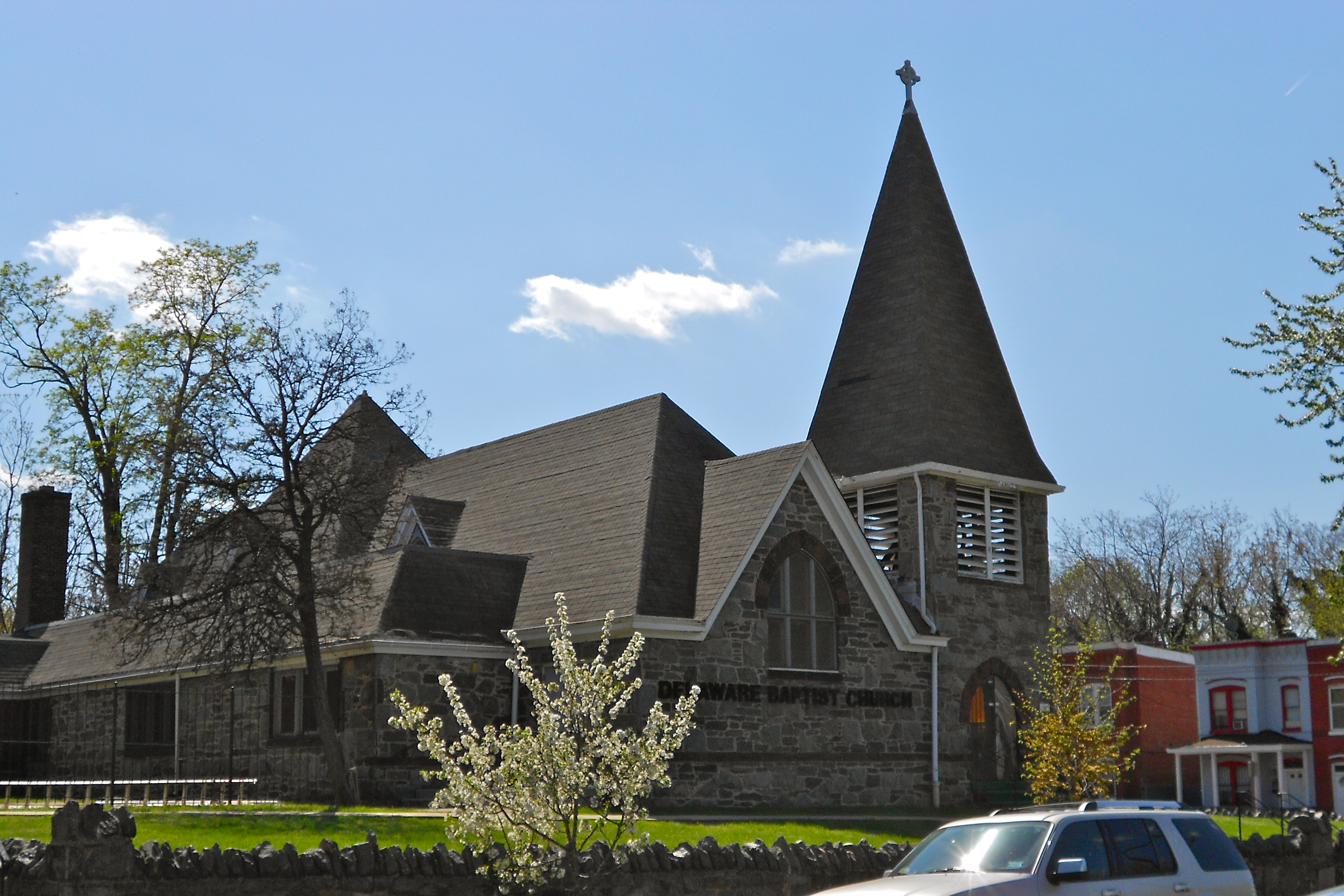
Delaware Baptist Church, 13th and V Streets

Several new subdivisions were built in the late 19th century, expanding the Anacostia Historic District. Among these were Griswold's (1881), Green's (1881, carved from the former George Barber farm), Griswold's II (1886), Avalon (1887), Avalon Terrace (1889), Anacostia Addition (1890, created from the Otterback farm), Bryan Place (1892, part of the former Talburtt estate), and Griswold's III (1894). These subdivisions retained the architectural styles of the original Uniontown development and are considered extensions of it.

The area also saw some civic improvements. Horse-drawn streetcar service reached the area in 1875, 13 years after the rest of the city had achieved service, and electric streetcars arrived in 1895. St. Teresa's Catholic Church was built at 1244 V Street SE in 1879, and Emanuel Episcopal Church (now Delaware Avenue Baptist Church) at 1301 V Street SE was erected in 1891 to replace an 1869 church whose foundation had cracked. The 11th Precinct of the Metropolitan Police Department was established in 1901 to patrol the area, the Ketcham School (now Ketcham Elementary School) was built in 1907, and water and sewage service installed between 1904 and 1920. Nonetheless, water and sewage service in the area remained spotty, and some homes drew water from public standpipes as late as the 1960s. The Commissioners of the District of Columbia changed the street names in Anacostia to conform to those in the city of Washington in 1908. In 1920, local African-American Roman Catholics constructed Our Lady of Perpetual Help church on land formerly owned by physician J.C. Norwood. The Fort Stanton site was purchased by National Capital Park Commission (NCPC) for $56,000 in 1926. In 1867, Major General Oliver Otis Howard, commissioner in charge of the Bureau of Refugees, Freedmen and Abandoned Lands, purchased John Barry's farm immediately southwest of Uniontown/Anacostia, subdivided the property, and sold small lots at rock-bottom prices to formerly enslaved people (establishing the neighborhood of Barry Farm). Businessman Arthur Randle purchased the John Jay Knox farm south of St. Elizabeths Asylum and established the new subdivision of Congress Heights in 1890. He purchased undeveloped land south of Pennsylvania Avenue SE and created another new subdivision, Randle Highlands Uniontown/Anacostia, Barry Farm, Congress Heights, and Randle Highlands remained isolated from one another, and most of the land between them was undeveloped until World War II. The oppressive need for housing during the war, brought by a massive influx of federal workers to the capital, led to extensive development of the region and the linking of the area encompassed by the Anacostia Historic District with other parts of Southeast D.C. Only 16 percent of the homes in Southeast Washington below Pennsylvania Avenue SE were built before 1940, but 38 percent were built after 1950.

Suburbanization dramatically changed the area in the 1960s and 1970s. The Anacostia neighborhood, 82.4 percent white in 1950, was only 67.7 percent white in 1960 and 86 percent black by 1970. The influx of large numbers of low-income African Americans, coupled with the economic dislocations caused by the 1968 Martin Luther King, Jr. assassination riots, led many businesses to leave the Anacostia business district. During the crack epidemic in Washington in the 1980s, the Anacostia neighborhood became synonymous with crime and violence and had one of the highest crime rates in the District of Columbia (albeit not in all crimes)—leading to further deterioration in the condition of the buildings in the area.

== Recent actions regarding the district ==
The southern part of the Washington Metro's Green Line was originally designed to pass over the 11th Street Bridges to the intersection of Good Hope Road SE and Martin Luther King, Jr. Avenue SE. The site of the Anacostia Station at this intersection led to concerns that the Metro station would destroy the character of historic Anacostia, and after pressure from the federal government Metro moved the site of the station to Howard Road SE.

The Anacostia Historic District was added to the National Register of Historic Places in 1978. After the 1990 census required the District government to redistrict the borders of its electoral districts (wards), a proposal was made to split the Anacostia Historic District between Ward 7 and Ward 8. This proposal was defeated.

Efforts have been made to improve the physical and economic conditions in the Historic District. The area's designation as a historic district has been used to prevent the McDonald's corporation from moving into the area, the relocation of a homeless shelter to the area, and the construction of moderate-income rowhouses. In 1992, the city began replacing concrete sidewalks in the Anacostia Historic District with red brick to restore the sidewalks to their original condition. In 2002, the city adopted the Historic Housing Tax Credit Act of 2002, which allowed homeowners in the historic district to claim a tax credit of 50 percent of the cost of renovating their home (up to a limit of $25,000 over five years). Five years later, the D.C. Historic Preservation Office provided $300,000 in $35,000 individual grants to Anacostia residents to help them restore, renovate, and rehabilitate their homes. In 2008, the city increased the budget for the grant program to $900,000.
