= Tyrhee Moore =

American mountaineer

Tyrhee Moore is an American mountaineer and member of the first all African American team to climb Denali in 2013. Moore is a Mountaineer and Outdoor Education Advocate active with the Diversify Outdoors coalition and founder of Soul Trak Outdoors.

== Biography ==
Moore was born and raised in the Barry Farm neighborhood of Washington, DC. Moore was introduced to the outdoors in the 7th grade while attending a summer camp in Jackson Hole, Wyoming with the City Kids Wilderness Project, where he continues to volunteer as a mentor. In 2015, Moore graduated from West Virginia University with a Bachelor's Degree in Sport and Fitness Administration/Management.

== Notable accomplishments ==
- First all African American team to summit Denali. 2013

== Advocacy ==
- As the Founder and Executive Director of Soul Trak Outdoors, Moore actively advocates for breaking down racial barriers in the outdoor community. Moore is an active member of The Diversify Outdoors coalition.

== Accolades ==
- Named Backpacker Magazine Heroes of the Year 2014
- Named Outdoor Industry, Inspiration Awards 2014

== Filmography ==
- Expedition Denali (2014, Outside TV)
- An American Ascent (2016, 66 minutes, George Potter & Andy Adkins)
- ′Bringing it Home′ Connecting to the Outdoors (2019, 11:30, Scott Briscoe & James Q Martin)
