= Skyland (Washington, D.C.) =

Coordinates: 38.8588°N 76.9715°W

- Neighborhood of Washington, D.C.
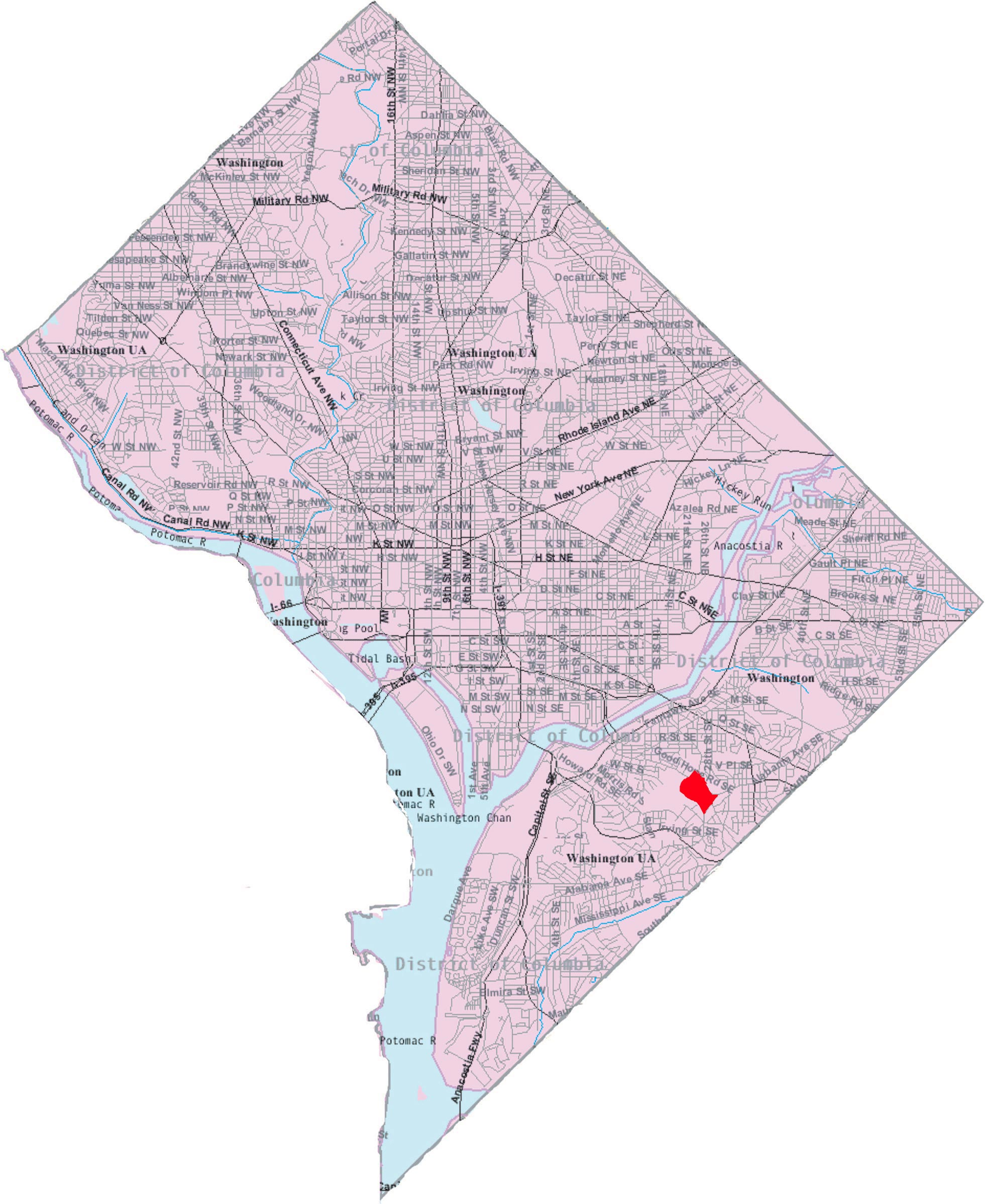
- Skyland within the District of Columbia
- Country: United States
- District: Washington, D.C.
- Ward: Ward 8

Government
  - Councilmember: Trayon White

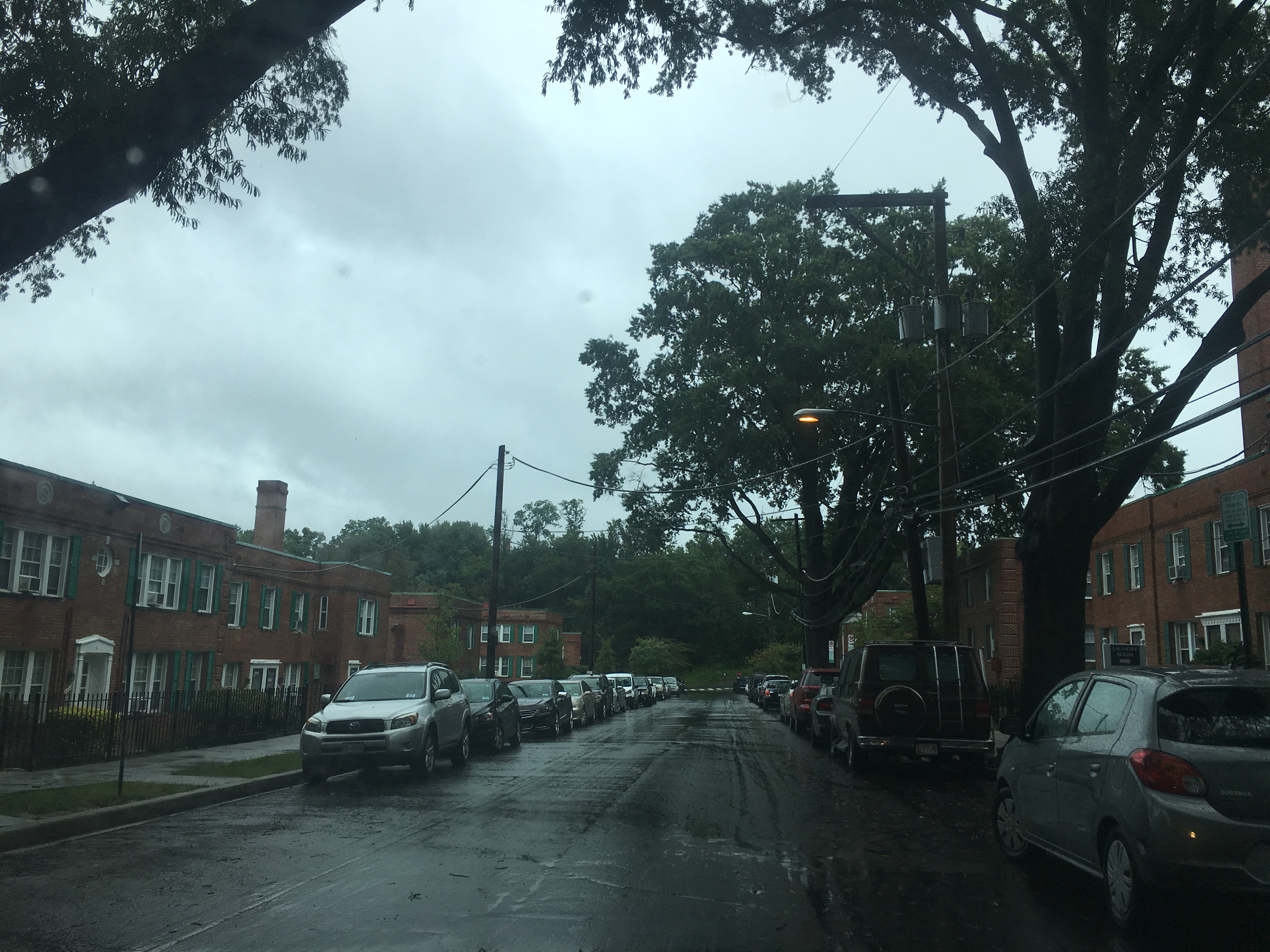
The Skyland neighborhood at the intersection of 24th St. and Wagner St SE, in September 2018

Skyland is a neighborhood in Southeast Washington, D.C. It is bounded by Good Hope Road to the northeast, Alabama Avenue to the southeast, and Fort Stanton Park to the south and west. It is part of Ward 8.

The District is in the midst of redeveloping the 18-acre (73,000 m^{2}) Skyland Shopping Center at Alabama Avenue and Naylor Road, SE in Ward 7 into a mixed-used town center.

The former Skyland Shopping Center was demolished in 2014 as part of the redevelopment of the site into Skyland Town Center.

The District is working with the Rappaport Cos. and the William S. Smith Cos. on a master plan for the site. Initial plans for Skyland Town Center call for more than 320,000 square feet (30,000 m^{2}) of retail space—a combination of high-quality, large format national-brand retailers and neighborhood serving shops and restaurants.

The project will also include 420 to 470 units of housing, about 80 percent of the units will be condos and 20 percent will be apartments.

Several outstanding legal issues associated with the project have complicated the development process, but the District is working closely with the development team and its architects, Torti Gallas + Partners, to accelerate the pre-development work so the project moves on a parallel track with the legal process.

The development team expects to have its master plan completed and a Planned Unit Development (PUD) application filed with the Zoning Commission by the spring of 2008. The District and development team are negotiating the business terms of their agreement. The DC Council has already approved a Tax Increment Financing (TIF) package to provide gap financing for the project.

Skyland is within the Good Hope neighborhood and borders Hillcrest to the east and Naylor Gardens to the southeast.

== Demographics ==
In 2018, Skyland had a population of 2,514. The racial and ethnic makeup was 95.8% Black, 1.4% Hispanic, 1.1% non-Hispanic white, 0.9% Asian, and 0.8% reported two or more races.

== See also ==
- Anacostia, another neighborhood
