= Good Hope (Washington, D.C.) =

- Neighborhood
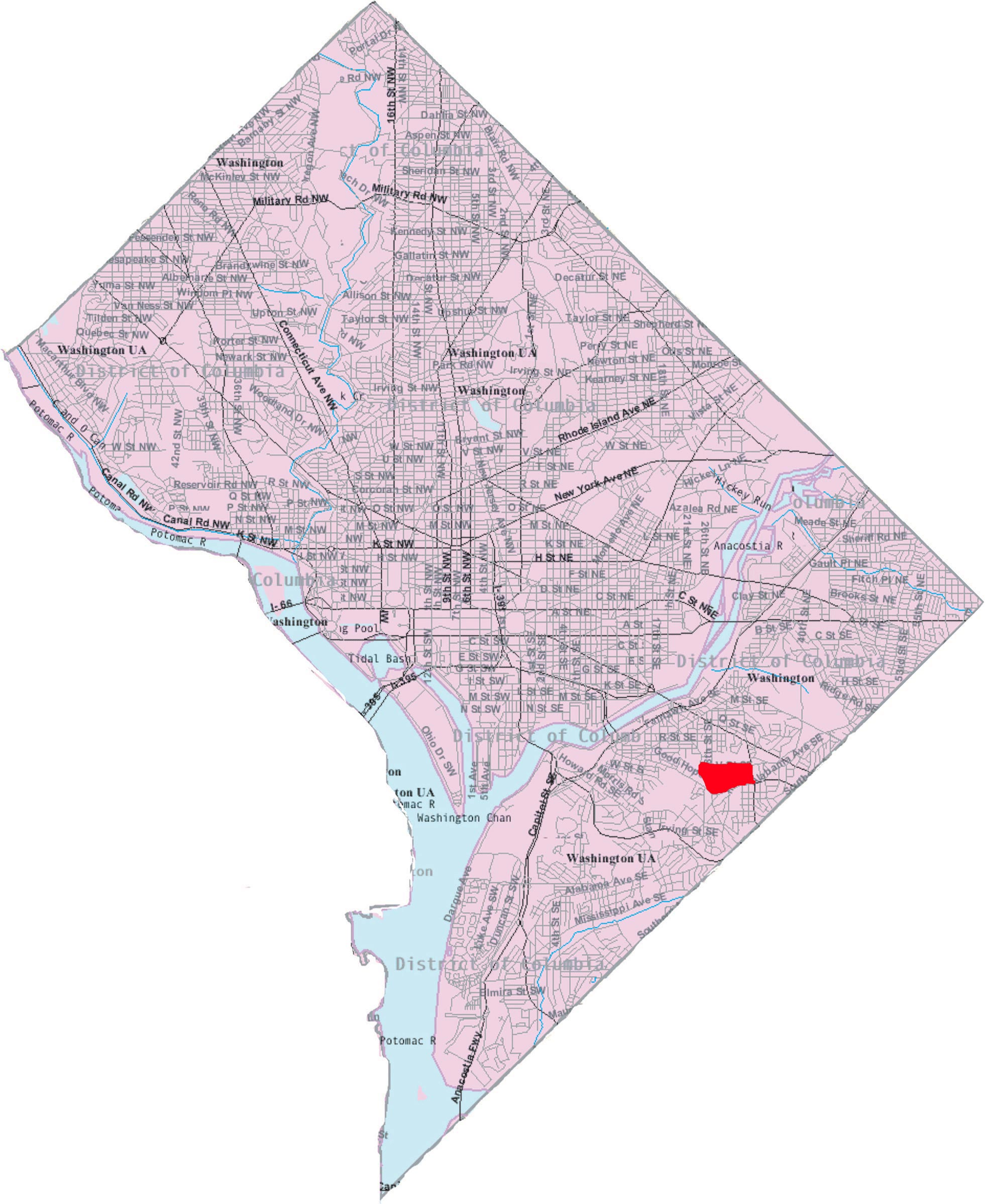
- Map of Washington, D.C., with the Good Hope neighborhood highlighted in red
- Coordinates: 38°51′49.575″N 076°57′53.55″W
- Country: United States
- District: Washington, D.C.
- Ward: Ward 8
- Constructed: 1820
- Named after: Good Hope Tavern

Government
  - Councilmember: Trayon White

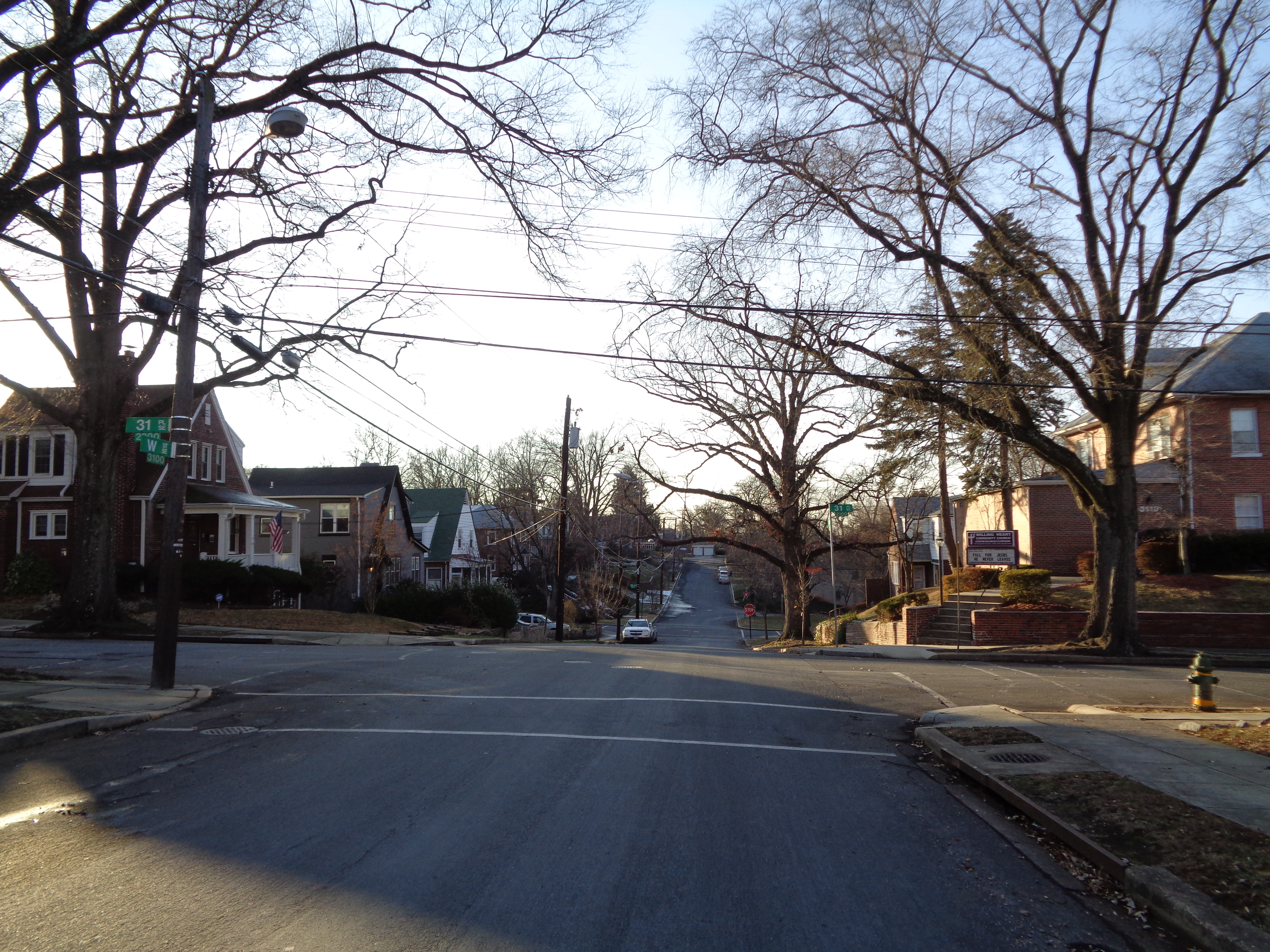
The intersection of 31st and W St., SE, in Good Hope, December 2017

Good Hope is a residential neighborhood in southeast Washington, D.C., near Anacostia. The neighborhood is generally middle class and is dominated by single-family detached and semi-detached homes. The year-round Fort Dupont Ice Arena skating rink and the Smithsonian Institution's Anacostia Museum are nearby. Good Hope is bounded by Fort Stanton Park(Fort Circle Hiker-Biker Trail) SE, Alabama Avenue SE, Naylor Road SE, and U Street SE. The proposed Skyland Shopping Center redevelopment project is within the boundaries of the neighborhood.

== History ==
Good Hope was the first permanent modern settlement of size in Southeast Washington.

The Nacotchtank Native Americans were the first settlers to inhabit the area now known as Good Hope, living and fishing along the nearby Anacostia River. Captain John Smith was the first European to visit the region in 1612 C.E., naming the river the "Nacotchtank". War and disease decimated the Nacochtank, and during the last 25 years of the 17th century the tribe ceased to exist as a functional unit and its few remaining members merged with other local Piscataway Indian tribes.

European settlement in Southeast Washington first occurred in 1662 at Blue Plains (now the site of the city's sewage treatment plant just to the west of the modern neighborhood of Bellevue), and at St. Elizabeth (now the site of St. Elizabeths Hospital psychiatric hospital) and Giesborough (now called Barry Farm) in 1663. Lord Baltimore granted ownership of the Good Hope area and much of what is now Southeast D.C. (giving it the name "Chichester") to John Meeks in 1664. "Anacostia Fort" was built on the heights at the present-day neighborhood of Skyland some time in the 18th century.

The area became part of the District of Columbia in 1791. Congress passed the Residence Act of 1790 to establish a federally owned district in which would be built the new national capital, and George Washington picked the current site in 1791 (a choice ratified by Congress later that year). William Marbury, a wealthy Georgetown merchant who later was a party in the landmark Marbury v. Madison Supreme Court case, purchased much of the "Chichester tract" some time in the late 18th or early 19th century.

The growth of the Washington Navy Yard created the need to provide housing for the many new employees working at the facility, but little land was available for new construction in the area and housing prices were high. Consequently, in 1818, the privately owned "Upper Navy Yard Bridge" was built over the Anacostia River at 11th Street SE. A toll bridge, this bridge was designed to permit easy access to Anacostia so that housing could be constructed on the eastern shore of the Anacostia River. A road was built from the bridge to the town of Upper Marlboro, Maryland, and named Upper Marlborough Road (called Good Hope Road SE today).

In 1820, the town of Good Hope, D.C., was founded around a tavern located near the current intersection of Marion Barry Ave SE and Alabama Avenue SE. Businesses began to construct buildings along Upper Marlborough Road toward the village of Good Hope, and a post office was established in the area and named Good Hope Station. In 1849, the post office's name was changed to Anacostia.

Good Hope remained little more than a crossroads, however. Uniontown/Anacostia, Barry Farm, Congress Heights, and Randle Highlands were the focus of most housing and retail development until 1940. Even these communities remained isolated from one another, and most of the land between them was undeveloped until World War II. The oppressive need for housing during the war, brought about by a massive influx of federal workers to the capital, led to extensive development of Southeast Washington and the linking of Good Hope with other parts of southeast D.C.
