= Hillcrest High School =

Hillcrest High School may refer to:

== Canada ==
- Hillcrest High School (Ottawa), in Ottawa, Ontario
- Hillcrest High School (Thunder Bay), in the Port Arthur area of Thunder Bay, Ontario

== Malaysia ==
- SMK Hillcrest

== New Zealand ==
- Hillcrest High School (New Zealand), in Hamilton, New Zealand

== South Africa ==
- Hillcrest High School (South Africa), in South Africa

== United States ==
- Hillcrest High School (Evergreen, Alabama), in Evergreen, Alabama
- Hillcrest High School (Tuscaloosa, Alabama), in Tuscaloosa, Alabama
- Hillcrest High School (Arkansas), in Strawberry, Arkansas
- Hillcrest High School (Inglewood, California), in Inglewood, California (Los Angeles metropolitan area)
- Hillcrest High School (Riverside, California), in Riverside, California (Inland Empire)
- Hillcrest High School (Idaho), in Ammon, Idaho
- Hillcrest High School (Country Club Hills, Illinois), in Country Club Hills, Illinois (Chicago metropolitan area)
- Hillcrest High School (Kansas), in Cuba, Kansas
- Hillcrest High School (Springfield, Missouri), in Springfield, Missouri
- Hillcrest High School (Queens), in New York City
- Hillcrest High School (Dalzell, South Carolina), in Dalzell, South Carolina
- Hillcrest High School (Simpsonville, South Carolina), in Simpsonville, South Carolina
- Hillcrest High School (Tennessee) in Memphis, Tennessee
- Hillcrest High School (Dallas), in Dallas, Texas
- Hillcrest High School (Midvale, Utah), in Midvale, Utah

== Zimbabwe ==
- Hillcrest College (Mutare), in Zimbabwe

== See also ==
- Hillcrest School (disambiguation)
