= Naylor Gardens =

- Neighborhood
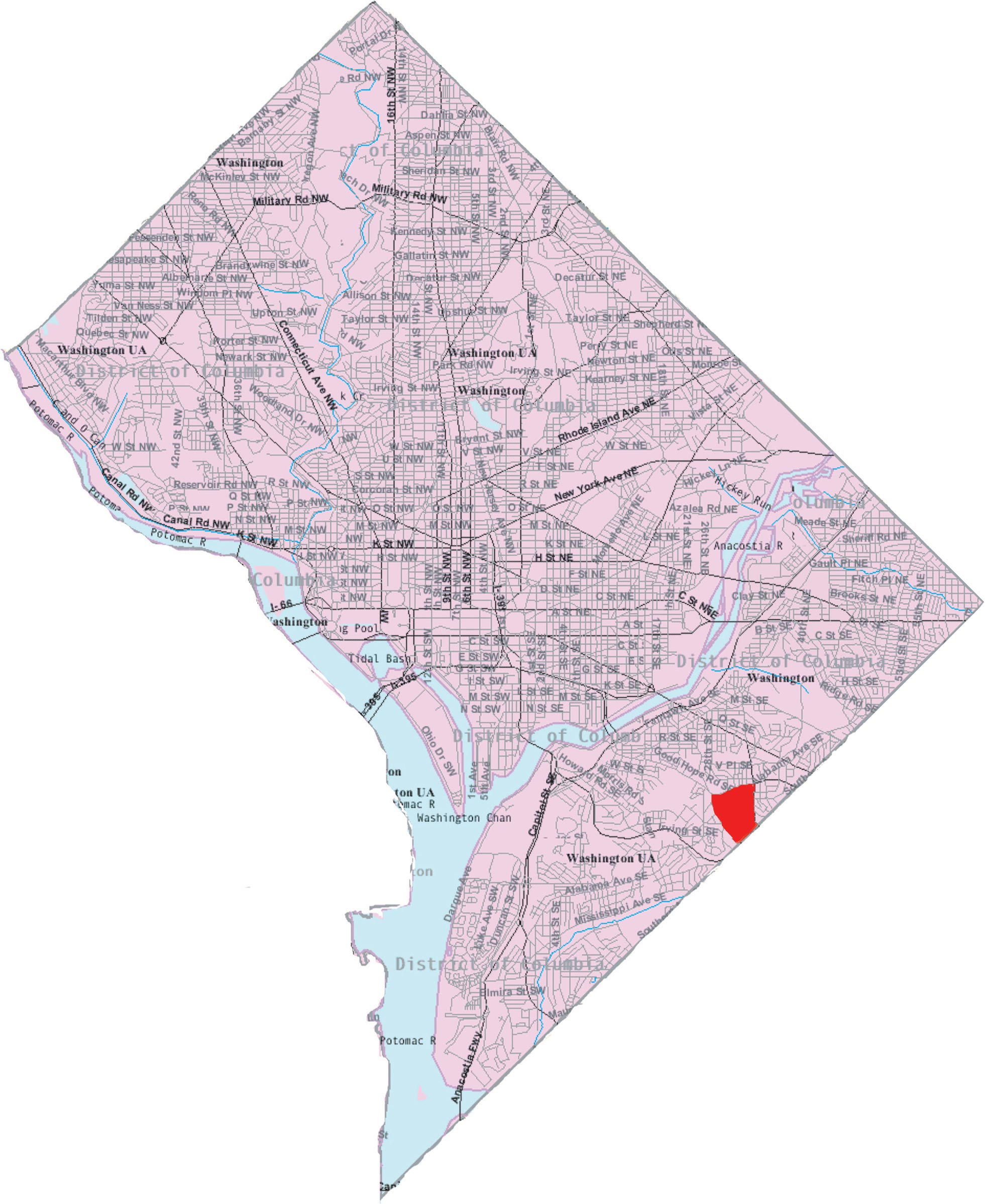
- Map of Washington, D.C., with the Naylor Gardens neighborhood highlighted in red
- Coordinates: 38°50′7.1232″N 076°59′16.7994″W
- Country: United States
- District: Washington, D.C.
- Ward: Ward 7
- Constructed: 1943
- Named after: Naylor Gardens apartment cooperative

Government
  - Councilmember: Wendell Felder

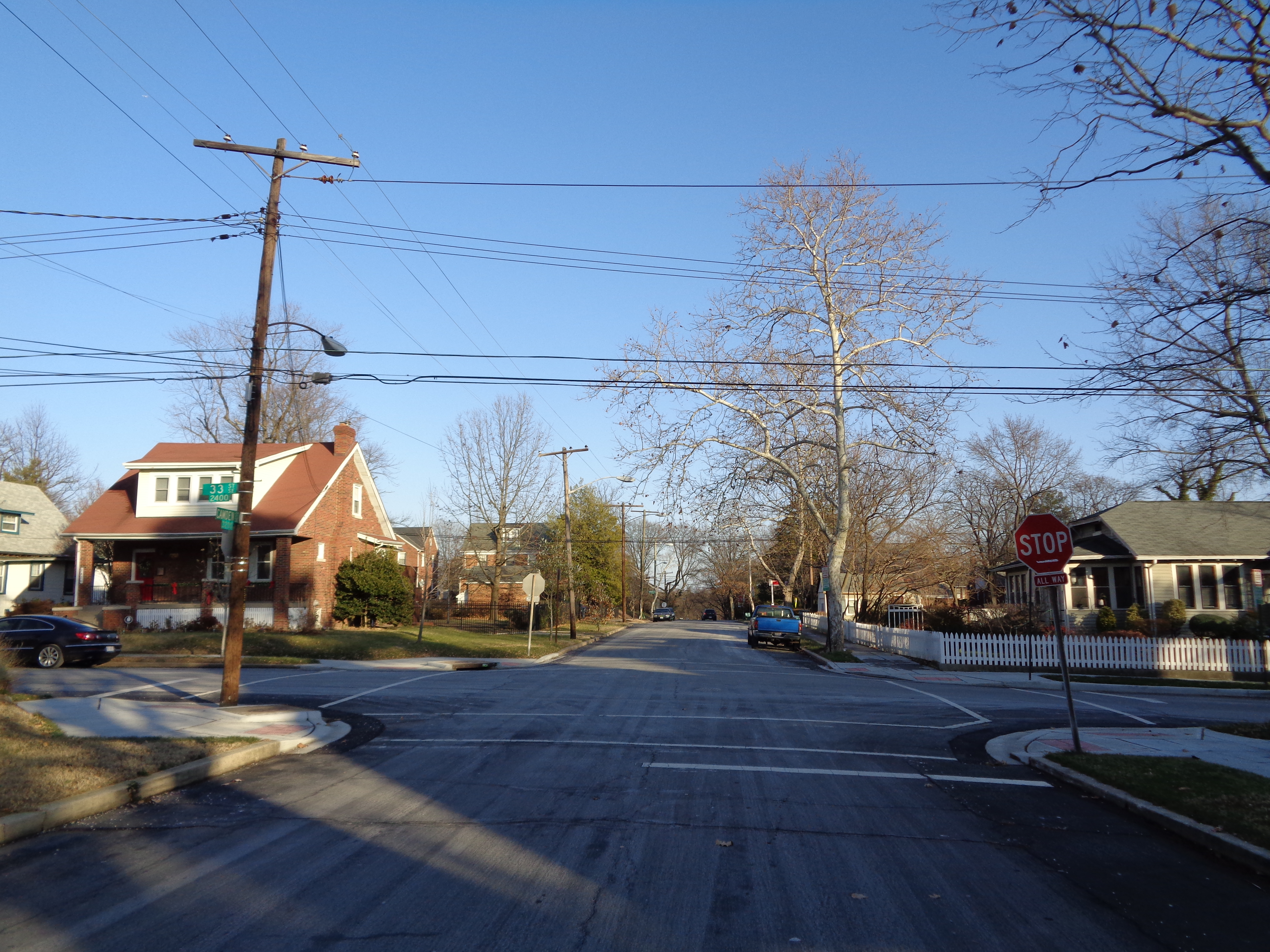
The intersection of Naylor Road and 30th Street SE, in Naylor Gardens, December 2017

Naylor Gardens is a small neighborhood located in southeast Washington, D.C. It is bounded by Alabama Avenue SE, Naylor Road SE, Good Hope Road SE, and Branch Avenue SE. The neighborhood is located in the area south and east of the Anacostia River.

Naylor Gardens was founded in 1943, when the Defense Homes Corporation, a federal agency of the United States government which constructed housing for defense workers during World War II, constructed the $6 million, 750-unit Naylor Gardens apartment complex. The complex opened on February 1, 1943. Naylor Gardens is dominated by a housing cooperative. Hailed by The Washington Post as one of D.C.'s last best kept secrets, the neighborhood is minutes away from Capitol Hill and the Anacostia and Potomac riverfronts, and a short walk to the Southeast waterfront. The community is adjacent to Hillcrest to the northeast, Skyland to the northwest, and Garfield Heights to the west.

== Bibliography ==
- Miller, Iris (2002). Washington in Maps, 1606-2000. New York: Rizzoli International Publications. ISBN 0847824470.
