= Hillcrest Elementary School =

Hillcrest Elementary School may refer to:

== Canada ==
- Hillcrest Elementary School, in Surrey, British Columbia, that is part of the School District 36 Surrey

== United States ==
=== Alabama ===
- Hillcrest Elementary School, in Enterprise, part of the Enterprise City Schools district

=== Arkansas ===
- Hillcrest Elementary School, in Lynn, part of the Hillcrest School District

=== California ===
- Hillcrest Drive Elementary School, in Los Angeles, part of the Los Angeles Unified School District
- Hillcrest Elementary School, in Monterey Park, California, part of the Garvey School District
- Hillcrest Elementary School, in Oakland, part of the Oakland Unified School District
- Hillcrest Elementary School, in San Francisco, part of the San Francisco Unified School District

=== Colorado ===
- Hillcrest Elementary School, in Northglenn, part of the Adams County School District 12 (commonly known as Adams 12 Five Star Schools)

=== Florida ===
- Hillcrest Elementary School, in Lake Wales, part of the Polk County Public Schools district
- Hillcrest Elementary School, in Orlando, part of the Orange County Public Schools district

=== Georgia ===
- Hillcrest Elementary School, in Dublin City, part of the Dublin City School District
- Hillcrest Elementary School, in LaGrange, part of the Troup County School District

=== Idaho ===
- Hillcrest Elementary School, in American Falls, part of the American Falls School District #381
- Hillcrest Elementary School, in Boise, part of the Independent School District of Boise City (commonly known as the Boise School District)

=== Illinois ===
- Hillcrest Elementary School, in Antioch, part of the Antioch Community Consolidated School District 34
- Hillcrest Elementary School, in Downers Grove, part of the Downers Grove Grade School District 58
- Hillcrest Elementary School, in East Moline, part of the East Moline School District 37
- Hillcrest Elementary School, in Elgin, part of the Elgin Area School District U46

=== Kansas ===
- Hillcrest Elementary School, in Lawrence, part of the Lawrence USD 497

=== Louisiana ===
- Hillcrest Elementary School, in Ruston, part of the Lincoln Parish School District

=== Maryland ===
- Hillcrest Elementary School, in Catonsville, part of the Baltimore County Public Schools district
- Hillcrest Elementary School, in Frederick, part of the Frederick County Public Schools district
- Hillcrest Heights Elementary School, in Temple Hills, part of the Prince George's County Public Schools district

=== Massachusetts ===
- Hillcrest Elementary School, in Turners Falls, part of the Gill-Montague Regional School District

=== Michigan ===
- Hillcrest Elementary School, in Alma, part of the Alma Public Schools district
- Hillcrest Elementary School, in Dearborn Heights, part of the Crestwood School District
- Hillcrest Elementary School, formerly in Kalamazoo before it closed in 1970

=== Missouri ===
- Hillcrest Elementary School, in Belton, part of the Belton School District
- Hillcrest School, in Lebanon, part of the Lebanon R-III School District

=== Montana ===
- Hillcrest Elementary School, in Butte, part of the Butte School District

=== New Jersey ===
- Hillcrest School, in Somerset, part of the Franklin Township Public Schools district

=== New York ===
- Hillcrest Elementary School, in Peekskill, part of the Peekskill City School District

=== North Carolina ===
- Hillcrest Elementary School, in Burlington, part of the Alamance-Burlington School System

=== Ohio ===
- Hillcrest Elementary School, now Richfield Elementary School, in Richfield, part of the Revere Local School District

=== Oklahoma ===
- Hillcrest Elementary School, in El Reno, part of the El Reno Public Schools district
- Hillcrest Elementary School, in Oklahoma City, part of the Oklahoma City Public Schools district

=== Oregon ===
- Hillcrest Elementary School, in North Bend, part of the North Bend School District

=== Pennsylvania ===
- Hillcrest Elementary School, in Drexel, part of the Upper Darby School District
- Hillcrest Elementary School, in Southampton, part of the Council Rock School District
- Hillcrest Intermediate School, in Huntingdon, part of the Norwin School District

=== South Dakota ===
- Hillcrest Elementary School, in Brookings, part of the Brookings School District

=== Tennessee ===
- Hillcrest Elementary School, in Chattanooga, part of the Hamilton County Schools district
- Hillcrest Elementary School, in Troy, part of the Obion County Schools System

=== Texas ===
- Hillcrest Elementary School, in Austin, part of the Del Valle Independent School District
- Hillcrest Elementary School, in Plainview, part of the Plainview Independent School District
- Hillcrest Elementary School, in San Antonio, part of the San Antonio Independent School District

=== Utah ===
- Hillcrest Elementary School, in Logan, part of the Logan School District
- Hillcrest Elementary School, in Ogden, part of the Ogden City School District

=== Washington ===
- Hillcrest Elementary School, in Lake Stevens, part of the Lake Stevens School District
- Hillcrest Elementary School, in Oak Harbor, part of the Oak Harbor School District

=== Wisconsin ===
- Hillcrest Elementary School, in Chippewa Falls, part of the Chippewa Falls Area School District
- Hillcrest Elementary School, in Ellsworth, part of the Ellsworth Community School District
- Hillcrest Elementary School, in Pulaski, part of the Pulaski Community School District

=== Wyoming ===
- Hillcrest Elementary School, in Gillette, part of the Campbell County Schools district
