= Hillcrest, West Virginia =

Hillcrest
- Unincorporated community
- Location within the state of West Virginia Hillcrest (the United States)
- Coordinates: 39°15′13″N 81°29′19″W
- Country: United States
- State: West Virginia
- County: Wood
- Elevation: 781 ft (238 m)
- Time zone: UTC-5 (Eastern (EST))
  - Summer (DST): UTC-4 (EDT)
- GNIS ID: 1560406

Hillcrest is an unincorporated community in Wood County, West Virginia, United States.
