= Hillcrest (Washington, D.C.) =

- Neighborhood
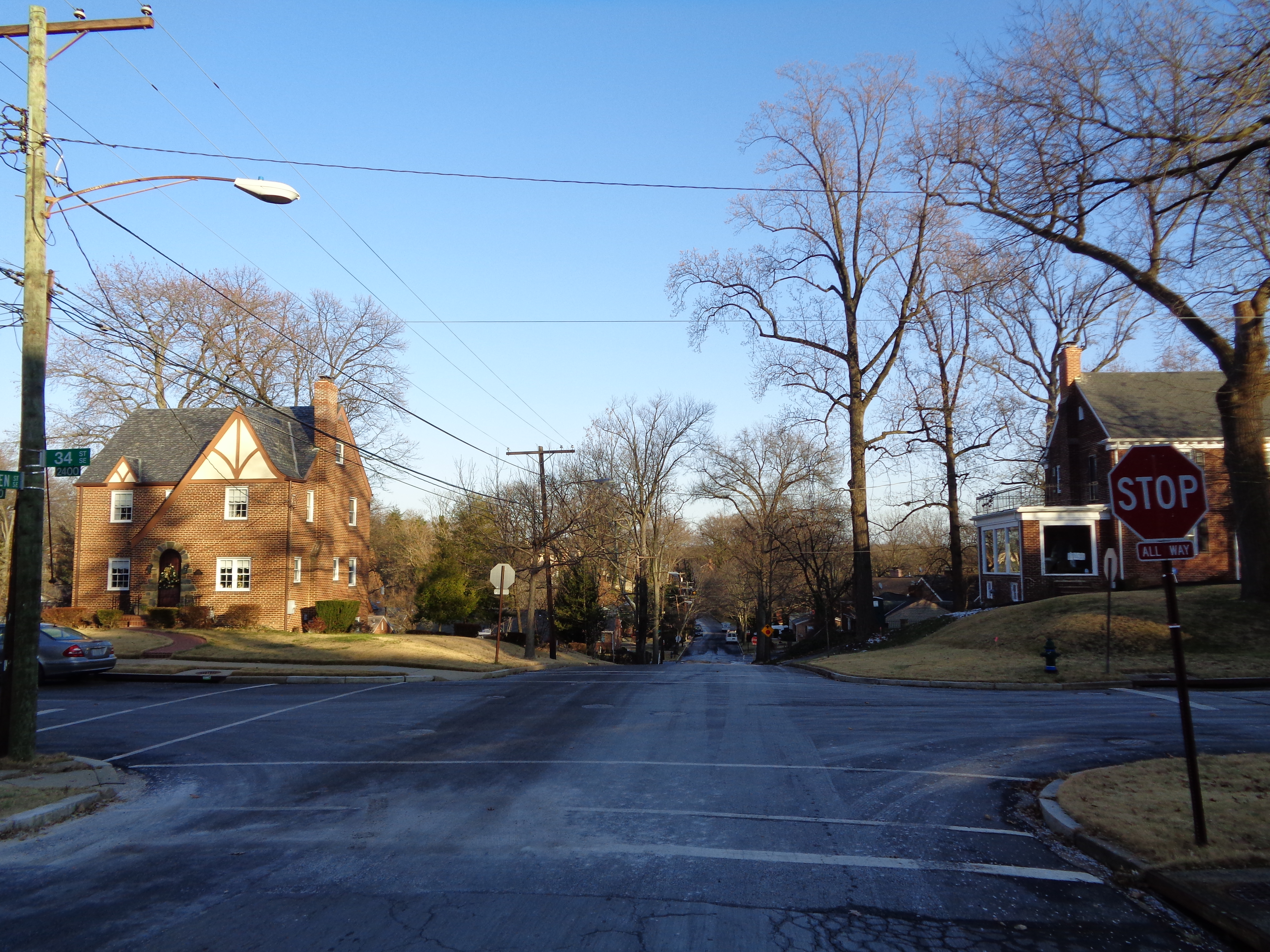
- The intersection of 34th St. and Camden St. SE, in Hillcrest, in December 2017

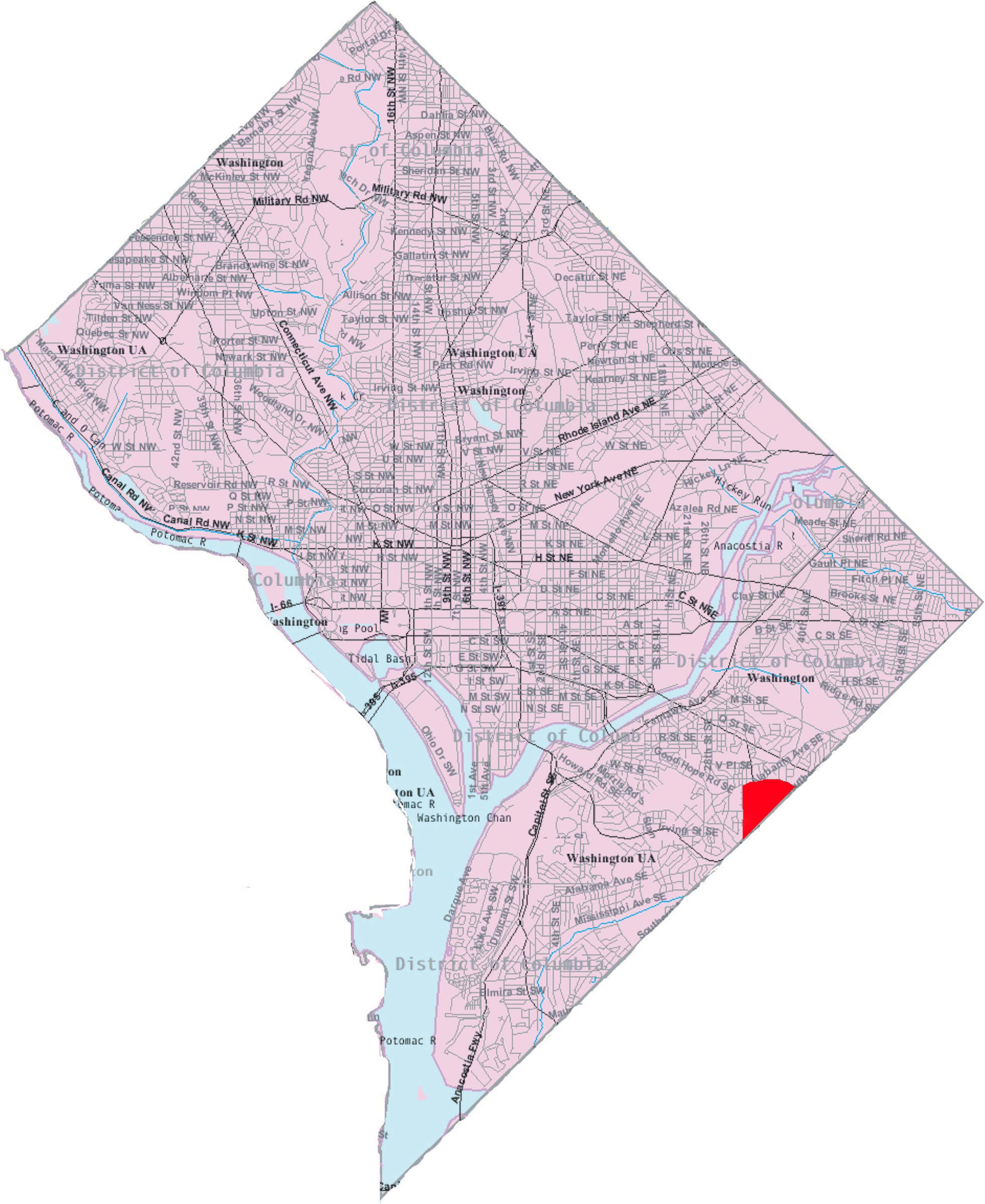
- Map of Washington, D.C., with the Hillcrest neighborhood highlighted in red
- Coordinates: 38°51′33.5772″N 076°57′24.969″W
- Country: United States
- District: Washington, D.C.
- Ward: Ward 7
- Constructed: 1937

Government
  - Councilmember: Wendell Felder

Hillcrest is a residential neighborhood in the southeast quadrant of Washington, D.C., United States. Hillcrest is located on the District-Maryland line in Ward 7, east of the Anacostia River.

== Boundaries ==
The National Capital Planning Commission defines Hillcrest as bounded by Branch Avenue SE, Gainesville Street SE, 32nd Street SE, and Alabama Avenue SE. It is bordered on the west by Hillcrest Park, which contains the Winston Education Center, Hillcrest Park Public Tennis Center, Hillcrest Recreation Center, and Washington Seniors Wellness Center. Originally, a separate and much more exclusive neighborhood, Summit Park (bounded by Suitland Road SE, Alabama Avenue SE, and Branch Avenue SE), existed to the east of Hillcrest. But by the late 1960s, it was generally considered to have been absorbed by Hillcrest. The Washington Post takes a far more expansive definition of Hillcrest, claiming the boundaries of the neighborhood to be a vast area of east-of-the-river bounded Pennsylvania Avenue SE, Southern Avenue SE, and Naylor Road SE/28th Street SE. The newspaper's definition would include the neighborhoods of Fairfax Village, Good Hope, Naylor Gardens, and Randle Highlands in "Hillcrest". This definition of Hillcrest is generally rejected. The Hillcrest Community Civic Association defines the neighborhood as the area surrounded by Pennsylvania Avenue SE, Southern Avenue SE, Naylor Road SE, and 30th Street SE.

== History ==
Born in 1859, Colonel Arthur E. Randle, was a late nineteenth and early twentieth-century real estate developer, who earned some recognition for building the Congress Heights neighborhood, before developing Hillcrest and other areas, east of the Anacostia River. Moving his family into a large, Greek Revival house - later nicknamed "The Southeast White House" - in what is, now, the Randle Highlands, Randle encouraged more Washingtonians to follow and build grand homes, along Pennsylvania Avenue.

Today, Hillcrest is a residential neighborhood. Nearly all the residences are single-family dwellings on sizeable lots, although there are a few apartment buildings. Architectural styles include American Craftsman bungalow, Federal Revival, Mid-Atlantic Colonial Revival, and Tudor Revival. The aesthetics and quality of the structures are generally excellent, equal to those of the upper-middle-class neighborhood of Cleveland Park. Most of the homes near the intersection of Highview Terrace SE and 34th Street SE were constructed as luxury houses in late 1937 and early 1938, and was originally called "Fairfield".

== Residents ==
Two Mayors of the District of Columbia, Marion Barry and Vincent C. Gray, have lived in Hillcrest.

Former congressman and presidential candidate Dennis Kucinich purchased a house in Hillcrest in 2009.

== Bibliography ==
- Miller, Iris (2002). Washington in Maps, 1606-2000. New York: Rizzoli International Publications. ISBN 0847824470.
- Smith, Kathryn Schneider (2010). Washington At Home: An Illustrated History of Neighborhoods in the Nation's Capital. Baltimore, Md.: Johns Hopkins University Press. ISBN 9780801893537.
