= Hillcrest Country Club =

Hillcrest Country Club may refer to:

(by state)

- Hillcrest Country Club (Los Angeles), California
- Hillcrest Country Club (Boise, Idaho)
- Hillcrest Country Club (Indianapolis, Indiana), listed on the NRHP in Marion County, Indiana
