= Hillcrest School (Jos, Nigeria) =

Location
- Jos; Nigeria
- 9°56′0″N 8°53′00″E

Information
- Type: Private
- Motto: Love God Love Others
- Religious affiliation: Christian
- Established: 1942
- Faculty: 31
- Enrollment: 235
- Campus: 25 acres (100,000 m^{2})
- Colors: red and white
- Athletics: soccer, track and field, volleyball, tennis, basketball
- Mascot: Hillcrest Hawk
- Website: www.hillcrestschool.net

Hillcrest School is a private, co-educational day school situated in the city of Jos in Nigeria which is sponsored by ten Christian mission bodies.

Hillcrest School was ranked 40th out of the top 100 best high schools in Africa by Africa Almanac in 2003, based upon quality of education, student engagement, strength and activities of alumni, school profile, internet and news visibility.

== History ==
In 1942, Hillcrest School was founded to provide a Christian education for missionary children by the Church of the Brethren Mission. Anticipation was keen. Clarence and Lucile Heckman had been remodeling and getting ready the storeroom and house on the CBM compound for this hoped for day of July 22, 1942. The teacher, Mary Dadisman, welcomed 12 pupils to begin Hillcrest School, a new venture of the Church of the Brethren Mission. The school room, which also served as a house, had few pupils, with only two who were missionary children of CBM. Miss Dadisman, both a nurse and teacher had left the Garkida hospital to be the first teacher of the school.

In its first location, the school supplied a bed, food, foster parents, a teacher, but no text books. The order had been placed early, but the books were lost at sea because of the war. A second order was placed. When it didn't arrive, a tracer brought a report: ship sunk. Then in May, 1943 80 different packages arrived. School was dismissed and all the children went with the staff to the post office to bring the first text books to Hillcrest. Books had never been more welcomed by either pupils or teachers.

In 1946, the school moved to the current location. In 1952 Hillcrest had been in operation for 10 years. The enrollment was above 70. A special recognition service was held at St. Piran's church and 8th grade certificates were presented there to the 6 graduates. From the beginning, Hillcrest accepted pupils without regard to race or colour. On March 29, 1947, "The Nigerian Daily Times", Lagos, carried an article "No colour Bar in Brethren Mission School." Other missions quickly developed an interest in Hillcrest. So, in 1955 the Sudan United Mission, Assemblies of God Mission and the United Missionary Society joined CBM's efforts. These original four grew to include the Missouri Synod Lutheran Mission (1963), the American Lutheran Mission (1964), the Nigerian Baptist Mission (1967), Mambilla Baptist Mission (1967), Sudan Interior Mission (1968), the Great Commission Movement (1982), United Methodist and the Wycliffe Bible Translators.

By November 1955 all arrangements for capital contributions and organization had been worked out and the first meeting of the Board of Governors of Hillcrest School met. A constitution had been written, home boards had been contracted over and over and when the Board met for the first meeting there were present people from the 4 cooperating branches of S.U.M., Assemblies of God, U.M.S. and C.B.M. Cooperating missions share in capital investments and furnish staff members.

In 1972, Hillcrest became a day school and many of the cooperating bodies opened their own hostels. Currently, there are five approved hostels: Pineview (DL), Niger Creek (SIM), Crescent Hill (IMB), Mountain View (CRC) and DivineView (non-mission). Hillcrest began as a primary school, and secondary school classes were taken by correspondence until 1964. 1965 saw the first graduating class made up of eight students.

== School Facts ==
Hillcrest School is a cooperative mission school run by 10 cooperating mission agencies, and each is responsible to supply teachers. Since its beginning in 1942, it has educated not only missionary kids but children from all over the world.

Currently, there are 235 students in grades 1–12, representing twenty four countries and ten major languages. Hillcrest has been open to Nigerian students and expatriates who meet the entrance requirements established by the Board of Governors of the school. Most of the students of the school live in Jos, but there are many children who board while their parents are doing mission work in other places in Nigeria and West Africa. Four of the hostels that students board in are; Divine View Hostel and Pine View Hostel.

The faculty at Hillcrest is made up of experienced, certified teachers. Twelve of the thirty teachers on staff hold advanced degrees beyond a Bachelor of Arts and Science.

The school is on about 25 acres (100,000 m^{2}), and breaks into three schools, Elementary (grades 1–5), Middle (grades 6–8), and High School. The school uses an American curriculum and is designed to academically equip students to successfully fit into American and European Colleges and Universities. The school offers a wide range of courses which includes Bible (4 courses), English (8), Industrial Arts (4), Mathematics (10), Music (3), Physical Education (5), Science (5), Social Studies (5), Arts (6), Computer (4), Business (2), among other subjects and courses including AP courses.

== See also ==
- Missionary Kids
