= Barry Farm =

Neighbourhood in Southeast Washington, D.C.

Coordinates: 38.8593°N 76.9991°W

- Neighborhood
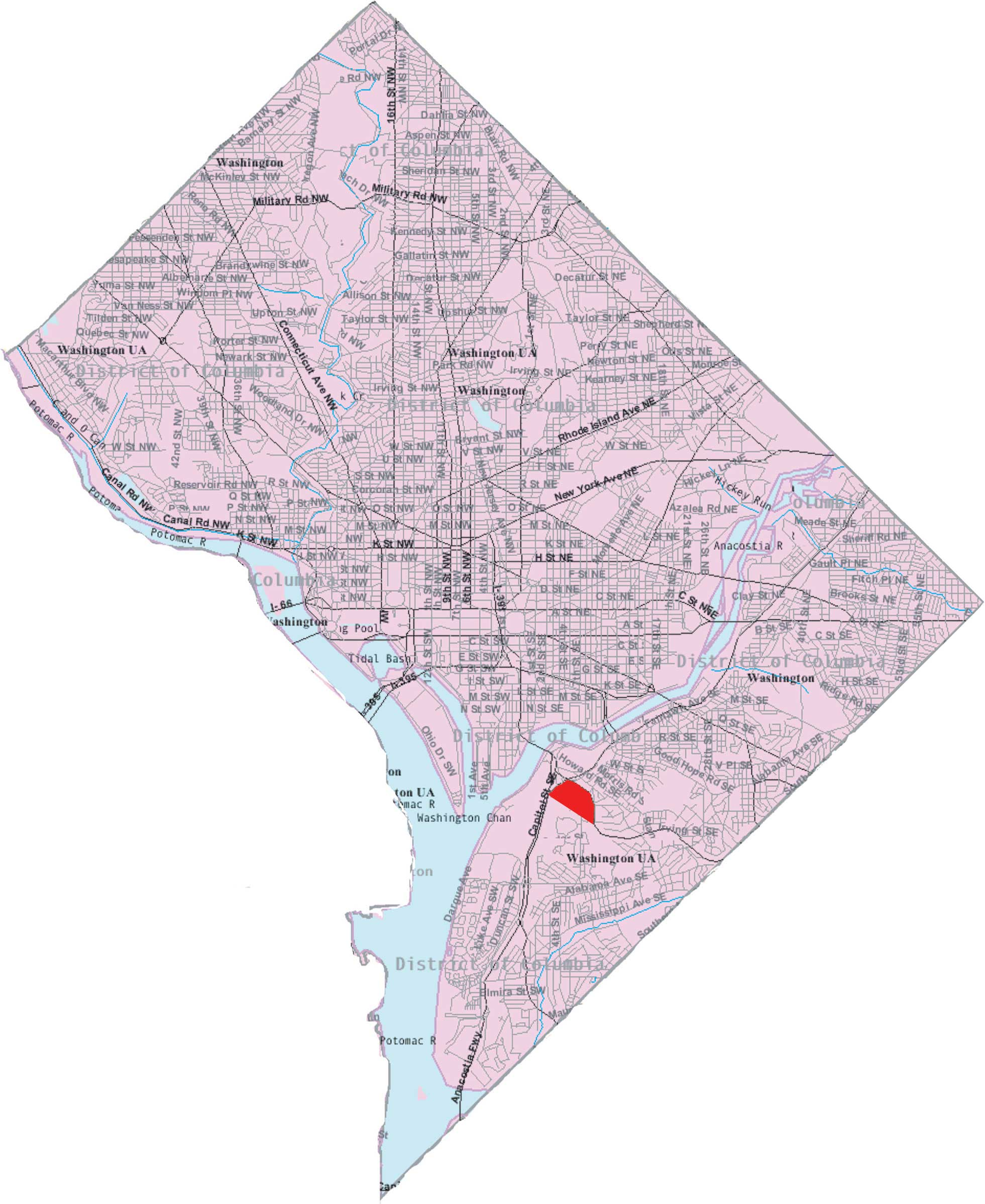
- Barry Farm within the District of Columbia
- Country: United States
- District: Washington, D.C.
- Ward: Ward 8

Government
  - Councilmember: Trayon White

Barry Farm is a neighborhood in Southeast Washington, D.C., located east of the Anacostia River and bounded by the Southeast Freeway to the northwest, Suitland Parkway to the northeast and east, and St. Elizabeths Hospital to the south. The neighborhood was renowned as a significant post-Civil-War settlement of free Blacks and freed slaves established by the Freedmen's Bureau. The streets were named to commemorate the Union generals, Radical Republicans, and Freedmen's Bureau officials who advanced the rights of Black Americans during the Civil War and Reconstruction: Howard Road SE for General Oliver O. Howard; Sumner Road SE for Massachusetts Senator Charles Sumner; Wade Road SE for Ohio Senator Benjamin Wade; Pomeroy Road SE for Kansas Senator Samuel C. Pomeroy; Stevens Road SE for Pennsylvania Congressman Thaddeus Stevens, and Nichols Avenue (now Martin Luther King Jr. Avenue SE) for Henry Nichols who was the first superintendent of Saint Elizabeth's Hospital (Formerly called the Government Insane Asylum). The neighborhood name is not a reference to the late former mayor of Washington, D.C., Marion Barry, but coincidentally has the same spelling.

== History ==
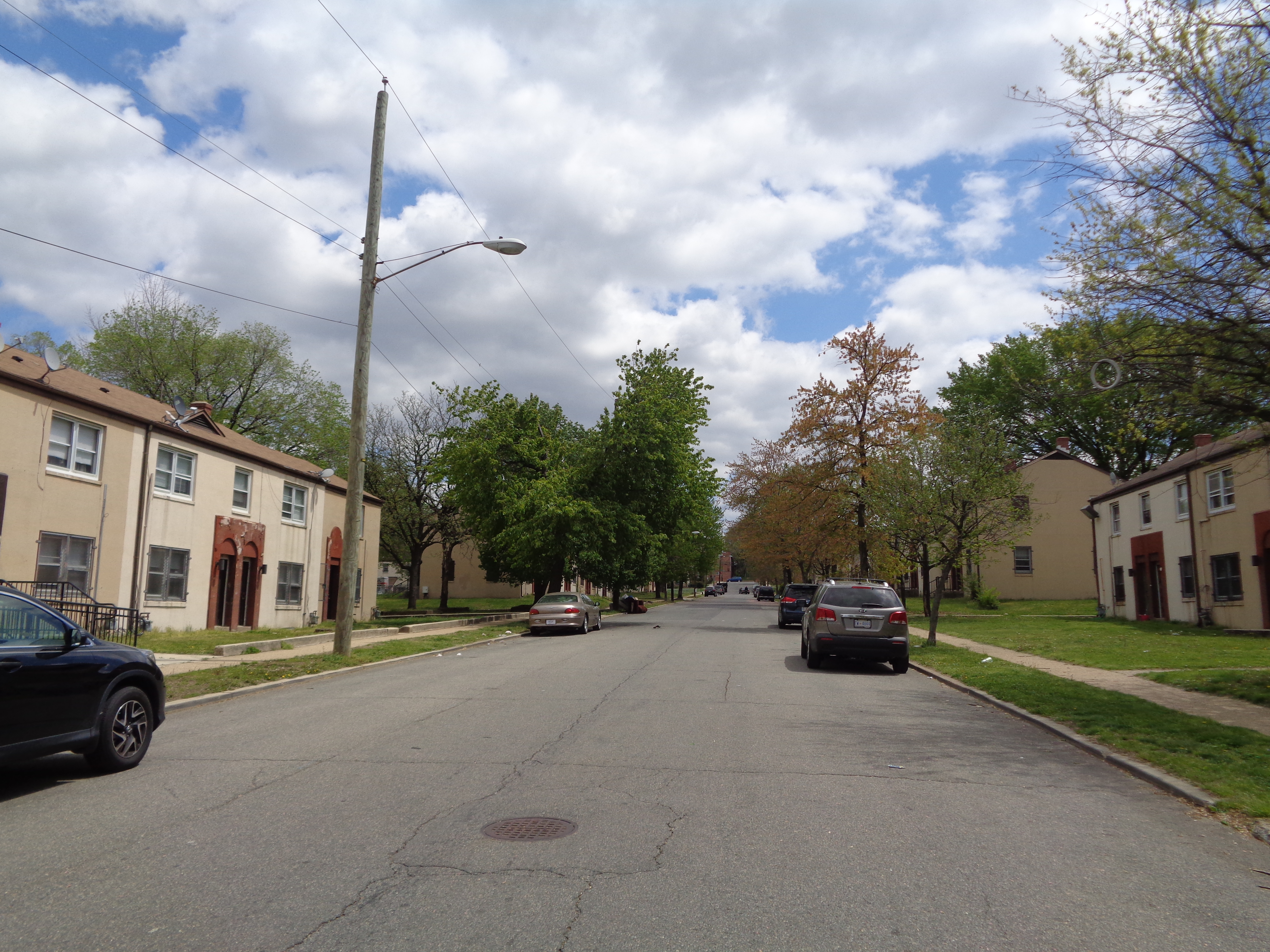
The neighborhood of Barry Farm at the intersection of Eaton Rd. and Firth Sterling Ave. before, April 2018, prior to redevelopment

In 1867, the Freedmen's Bureau (officially the U.S. Bureau of Refugees, Freedmen, and Abandoned Lands) bought a 375-acre farm from Julia Barry, a white landowner and recent owner of enslaved people, enabling the transformation of Barry's Farm into a thriving, independent community of formerly enslaved and free-born African Americans. The Commissioner of the Freedmen's Bureau, General Oliver O. Howard, had asked Black migrants squatting in temporary structures at Meridian Hill, what might help them to become self-supporting. They said, "Land! Give us land!" Howard promised to acquire land near the city. He then transferred $52,000 from the refugees' and freedmen's fund to be held in trust by himself, Senator Samuel C. Pomeroy, and John R. Elvans for the use of three institutions: Howard University, Richmond Normal School, and St. Augustine Normal School in Raleigh. They used some of these funds to purchase Barry's Farm. The Bureau sub-divided the farm into one-acre plots, which the freedmen could purchase over a period of seven years. For an additional $76, they could buy lumber to begin constructing a house. By 1869, money from the sale of the land, reportedly $31,178.12 (~$650,953 in 2024), had been returned to the fund and distributed to the three institutions listed above.

Barry Farm was initially a large homestead, stretching all the way to 13th Street on the east, Poplar Point on the West, and the present-day Morris Road SE on the north. In 1871, the area between 13th Street, Sheridan Road, and Martin Luther King Jr. Avenue SE (then known as Nichols Avenue), residents renamed the area Hillsdale. Railroad tracks laid around 1913 cut off Barry Farm from Poplar Point. The 1940s construction of a Suitland Parkway, originally a military highway from Bolling Field to Camp Springs, MD, further isolated the neighborhood between busy traffic arteries, required the demolition of nearly 100 houses, and displaced more than 600 residents. Beginning in the late 1950s, I-295, or the Anacostia Freeway, further restricted access to and visibility of the Anacostia River. Only a few old frame houses, mostly along Wade Road just at the edge of the thicket that separates Barry Farm from St. Elizabeth's Hospital, resemble those of the original Freedman's community.

The National Capital Housing Authority built the 442-unit Barry Farm Dwellings public housing project in 1943. Barry Farm was built with two- to four-bedroom town houses, with some later combined to create six-bedroom units, and a recreation center.

=== Demolition and redevelopment ===
In the 1940s, government agencies sought to destroy and completely redevelop the Barry Farm-Hillsdale community. Two reasons have been suggested: 1) the community's "inability "to pay for municipal services" through the collection of real estate taxes" and 2) these government agencies' desire to clear downtown Washington, DC, of African Americans and move them to Barry Farm-Hillsdale and Marshall Heights. The residents successfully stopped this redevelopment, but continually had to battle future destruction.

Through the city's New Communities Initiative and the Federal Choice program (the new HOPE VI), the DC Government demolished almost all of Barry Farm to redevelop Barry Farm from single-use public housing where households pay 30% of their incomes to reside in the community, into a mixed-use, higher density community with 1,600 units including homes for sale. In 2013, about 50 Barry Farm residents teamed up with community organizing group Empower DC. They formed the Barry Farm Tenants and Allies Association to stop the city from evicting them from their homes before new housing was built, to demand that the redeveloped site match the intentions of the site's original design in providing sufficient green space, and to guarantee their right to return.

Barry Farm redevelopment in southeast Washington, D.C.

From April 2018 until January 2019, hundreds of families were relocated from Barry Farm, and early 2019, demolition began. The Barry Farm Tenants and Allies Association successfully won a historic landmark designation for five public housing buildings that were home to well-known activists. Other than a recreation center, these were the only buildings that remained on the site as of 2022.

Redevelopment of the neighborhood is scheduled to be completed in 2030.

An application for National Historic status was submitted on behalf of Barry Farm in 2019. Thus far, it has not been placed on the National Register of Historic Places.

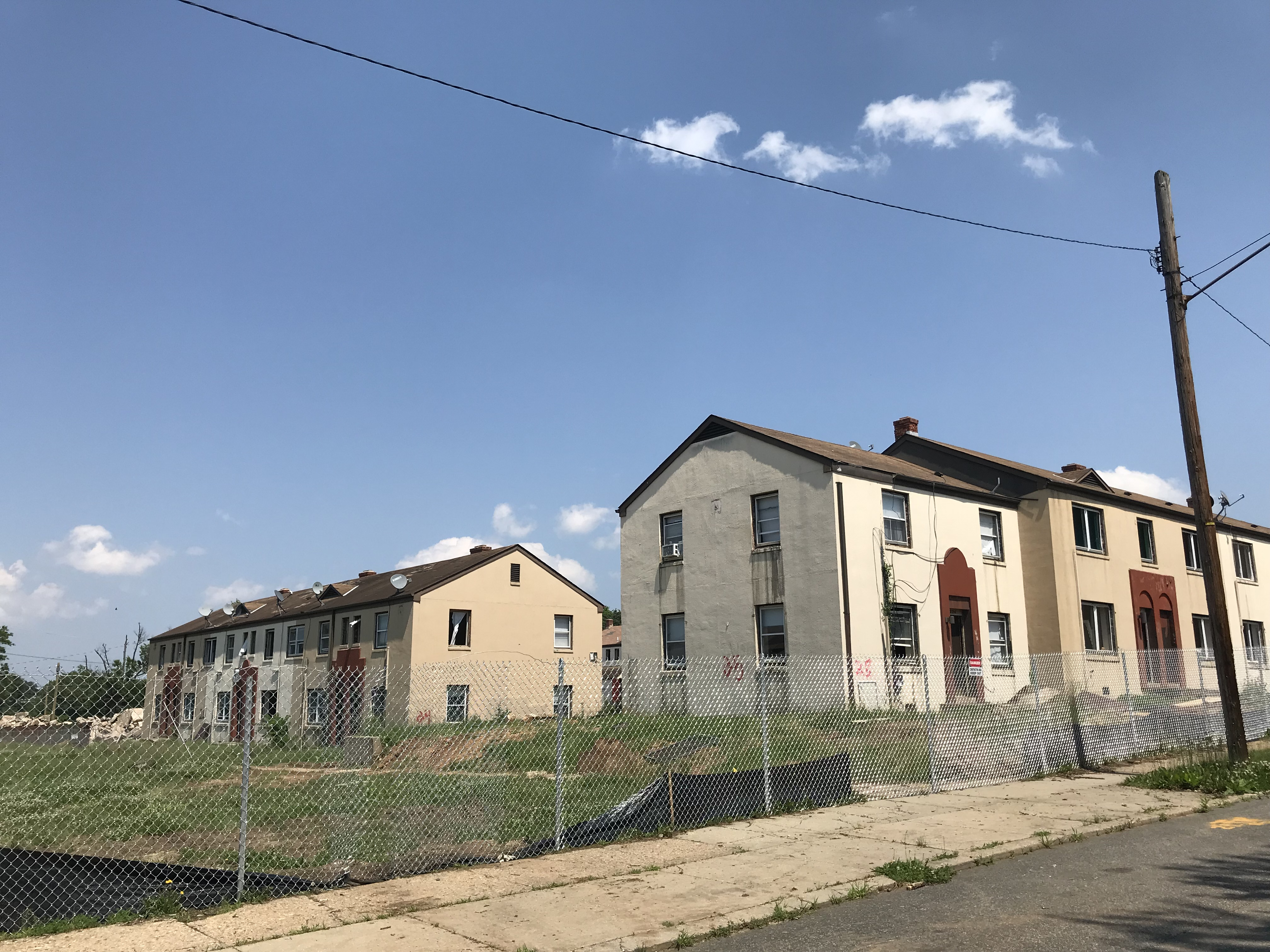
Barry Farm, May 2019, during the demolition phase, on Eaton Rd.

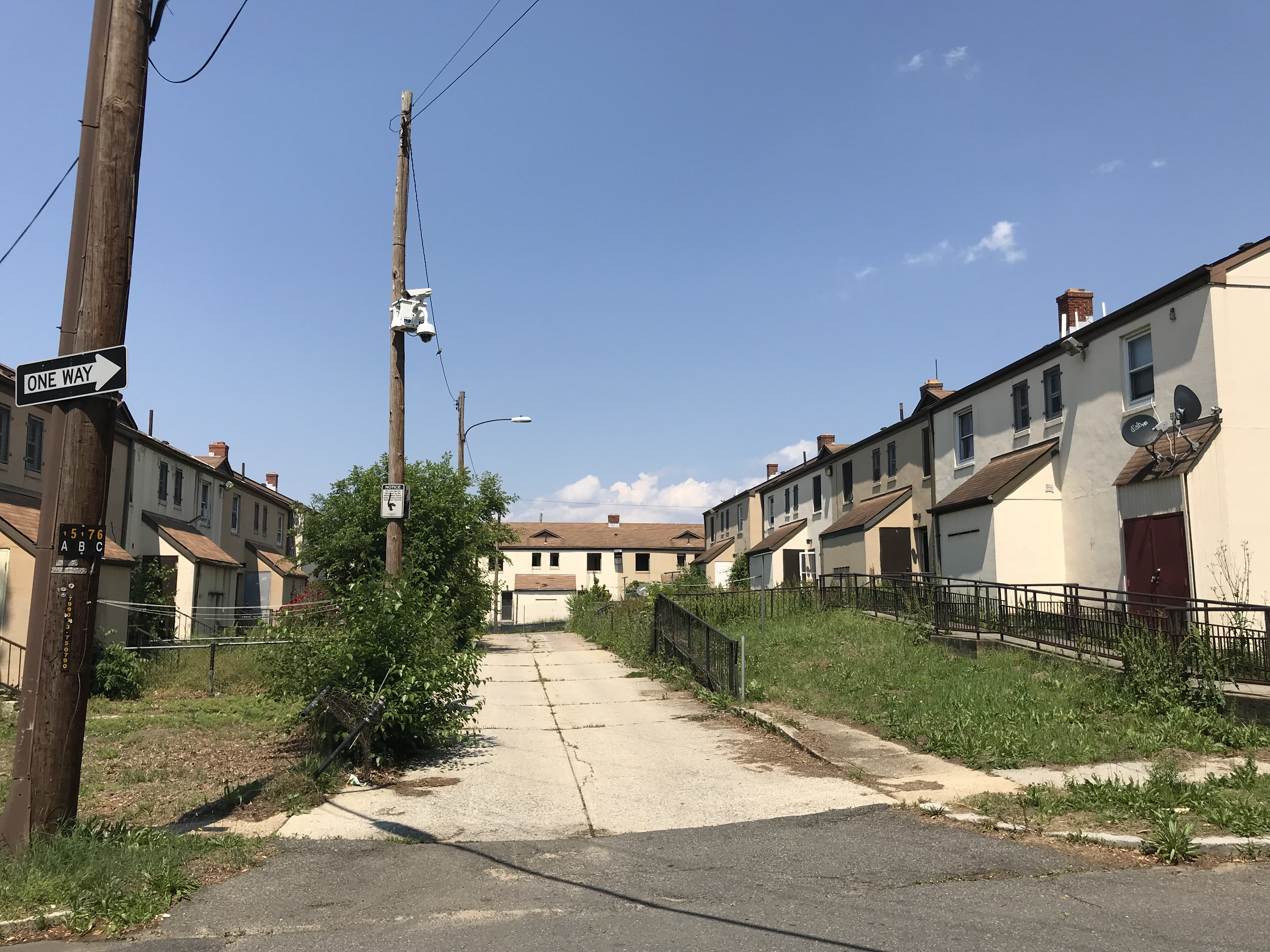
Barry Farm, May 2019 prior to demolition on Stevens Rd.

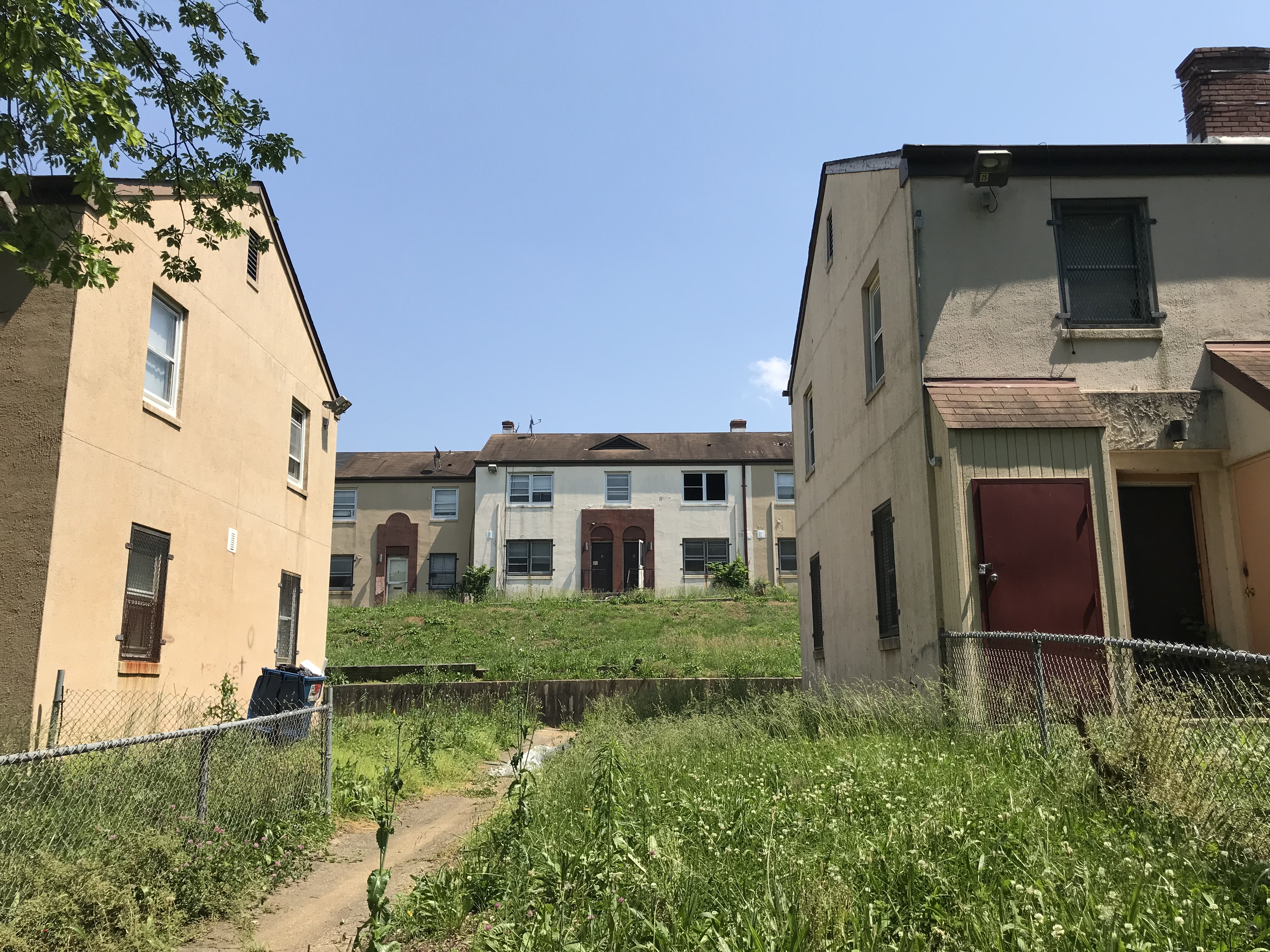
Barry Farm, May 2019 prior to demolition in an alley way off of Stevens Rd.

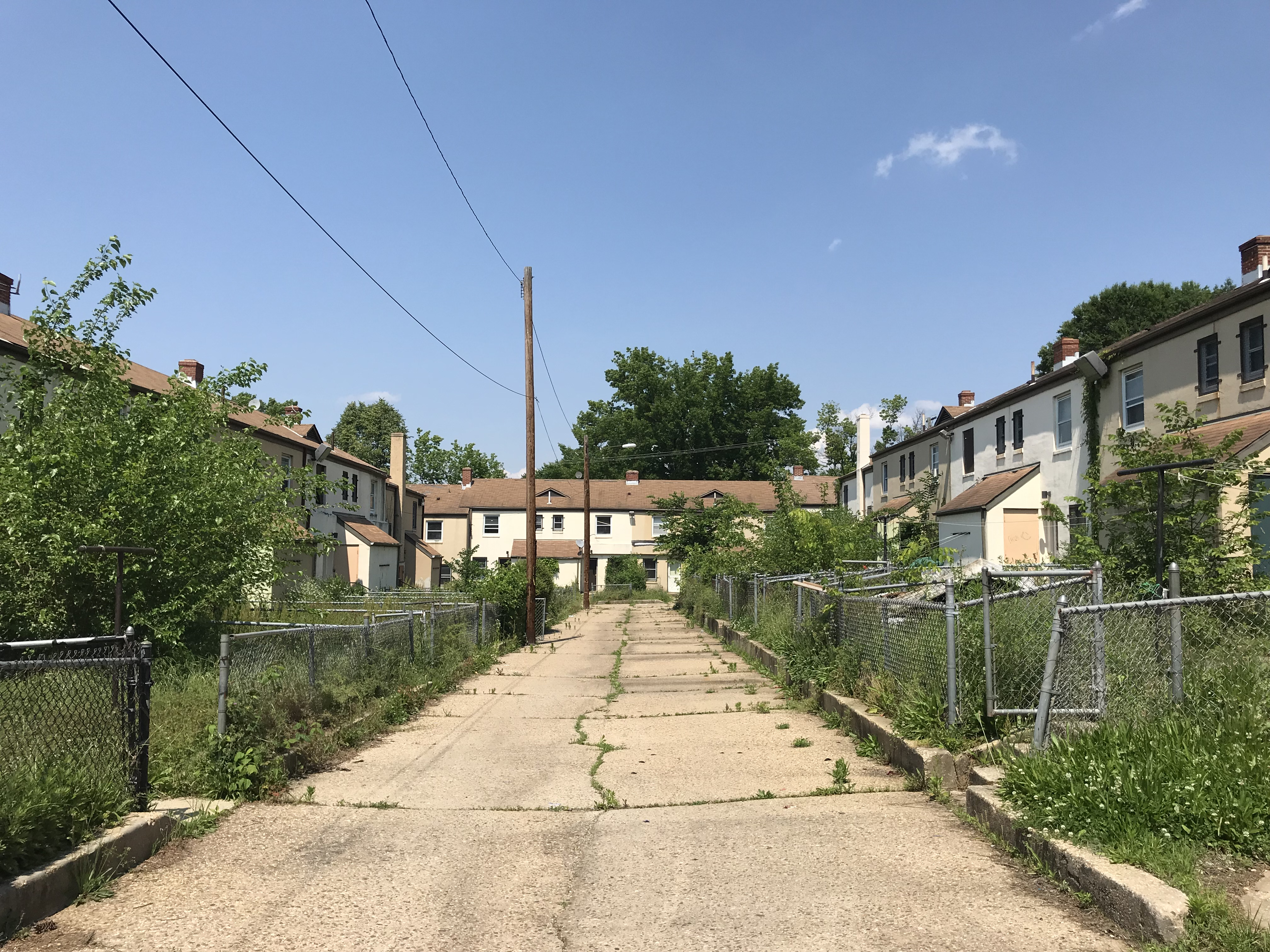
Barry Farm, May 2019 prior to demolition in an alley way off of Stevens Rd.

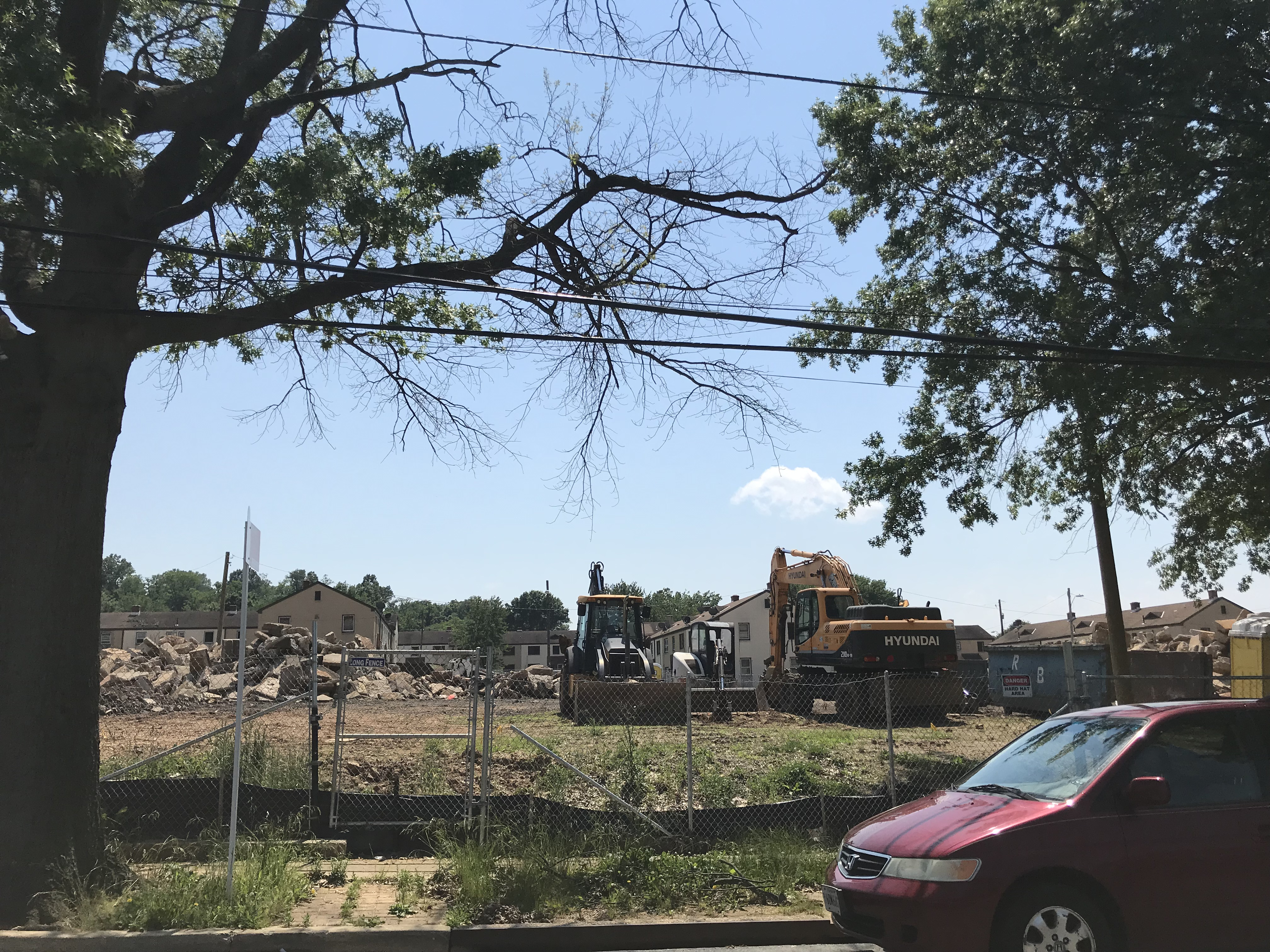
Barry Farm, May 2019 during demolition across from the Barry Farm Recreation Center

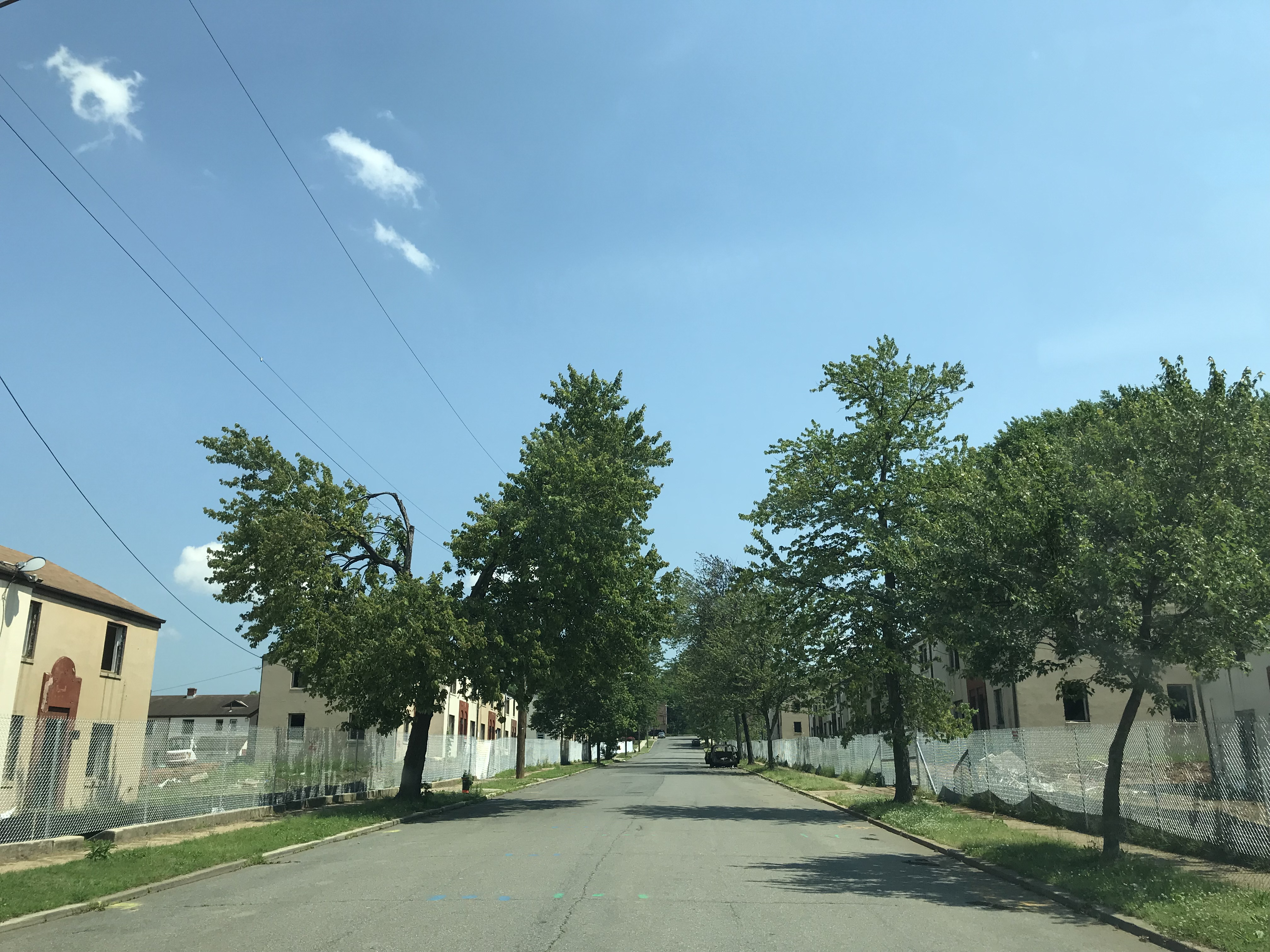
Barry Farm, May 2019 prior to demolition looking east on Eaton Rd.

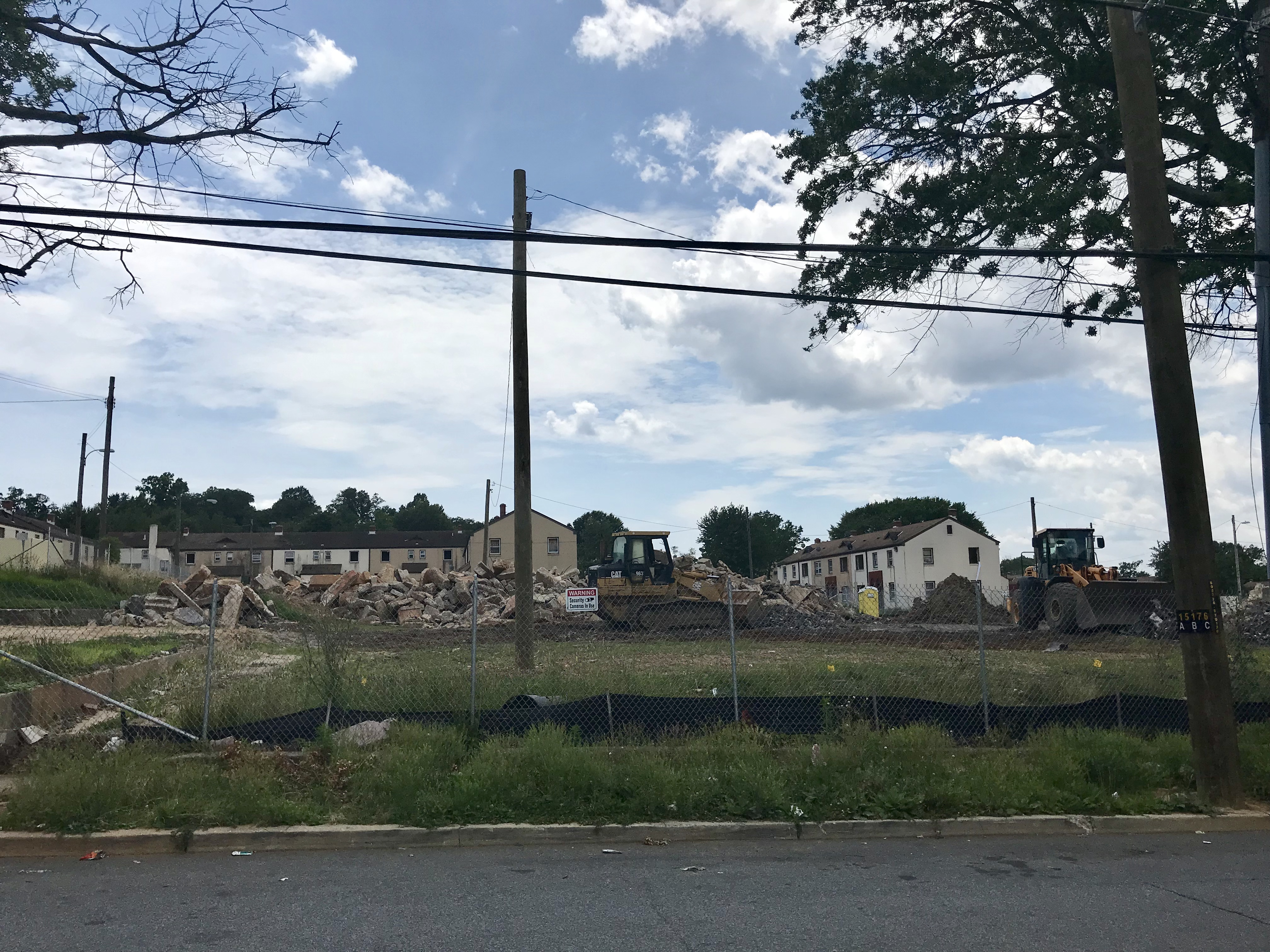
Barry Farm, June 2019 during demolition looking east on Sumner Rd.

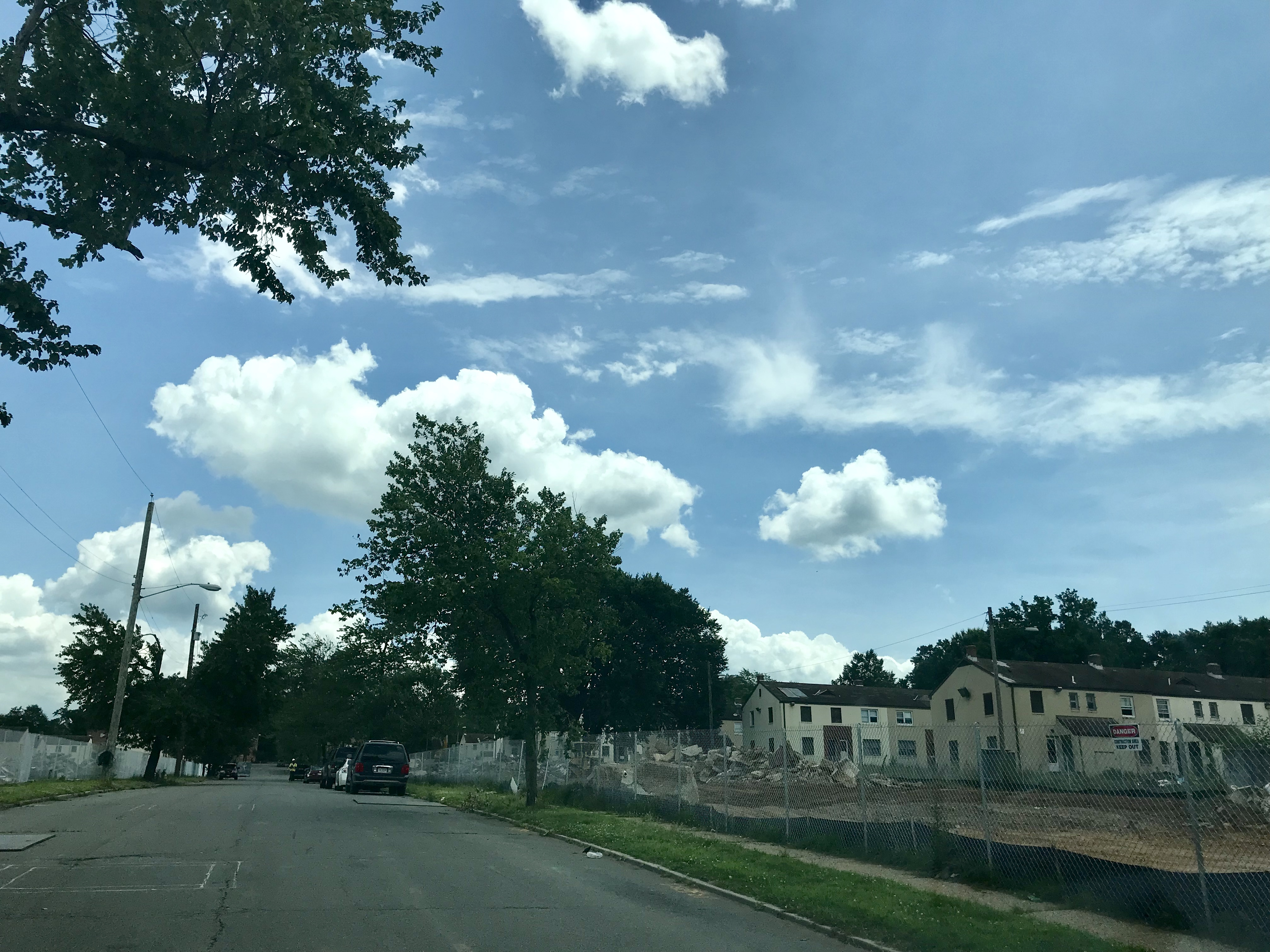
Barry Farm, June 2019 during demolition looking north on East Rd.

== Tenant activism and community life ==
Residents organized over the years both to pressure the city for assistance and to protect and support each other. Their actions brought them to the forefront of the civil rights movement. In the summer of 1949, Barry Farm-Hillsdale youth—Richard Robinson, Carl Contee, Richard Cook, Clarence "Dusty" Prue, Everett and Eugene "Mann" McKenzie, Toussaint Pierce, James Chester Jennings Jr, and Otis, Thomas and Bill Anderson—tried to enter the Anacostia Pool without success and continued to try over several days. Legally, the public pools were not segregated, but in practice this was a white segregated pool. There were violent clashes between hundreds of Whites and African Americans. The pool was closed, and the following year all the public pools were desegregated.

In the 1940s, there was just one junior high and no high schools for African Americans east of the Anacostia River. In 1950, Barry Farm Dwelling residents requested that they be admitted to the new, white-segregated Sousa Junior High and that the school be integrated. Their complaint became Bolling v. Sharpe and was one of several companion cases to Brown v. Board of Education. In 1954, the U.S. Supreme Court unanimously declared that segregated public education was inherently unequal, violated the Equal Protection Clause and the right to due process, and therefore was unconstitutional.

In the 1960s, there were new tenant organizing groups. The Band of Angels, a tenants' council made up of women and led by Stevens Road residents Lillian Wright and Etta Mae Horn, was one such group. The Angels' first achievement was an urgently needed $1.5 million renovation of Barry Farm Dwellings. Etta Horn later became an influential civil rights leader and served as vice chair of the National Welfare Rights Organization.

Since 1975, Barry Farm has been the home to Barry Farms Community Basketball League. This summer league was renamed the Goodman League after community activist and Barry Farm Recreation Center counselor George Goodman. The Goodman League features current and former NBA players, college players, and participants from various communities. The Barry Farm Beavers football team also plays at the recreation center.

In 1982, Barry Farm Dwellings residents, including Gladys Bunker, started a food co-op. The food co-op lasted for at least four years and accepted food stamps. Cornbread Givens and the Poor People's Development Foundation helped the co-op organizers.

In 1997, the Capital Area Community Food Bank and Community Educational Economic Development worked with Barry Farm Dwellings residents to start a farm.

== Notable residents ==
- Solomon G. Brown was the first African American employee at the Smithsonian Institution, serving for fifty-four years from 1852 to 1906.
- Emily Edmonson (1835–1895), later Emily Johnson, was a founding member of the Barry Farm-Hillsdale community. On April 15, 1848, she and her sister Mary were among the seventy-seven slaves who tried to escape from Washington, DC on the schooner The Pearl to sail from the Chesapeake Bay to freedom in New Jersey. This is known as the Pearl incident.
- Etta M. Horn (1928–2001), later Etta M. Horn-Prather, was a key figure in the Welfare Rights Movement and became active in a tenants' council named The Band of Angels which successfully negotiated the $1.5 million renovation of Barry Farm in the 1960s. She went on to serve as the Director of D.C. Child Development Center on Martin Luther King Avenue SE for 25 years.
- John Shippen (1879–1968) was the first African American player to compete in the U.S. Open golf tournament (in 1896) and took fifth place. He participated five more times in the U.S. Open and made his career in golf.
- Georgiana Simpson (1865–1944) was the first African American woman to receive a doctorate and was a professor of German language and literature at Howard University.
- Several families involved in the national movement to desegregate schools, either as activists or plaintiffs in lawsuits, lived at Barry Farm Dwellings: the Jennings family, including sisters Adrienne and Barbara lived at 1139 Stevens Road; the Briscoe family lived at 1232 Eaton Road; Valerie Cogdell lived at 1269 Stevens Road; Wallace Morris lived at 1234 Eaton Road; Lauretta Parker lived at 1149 Stevens Road; and the Bolling family, including brothers Spottswood and Wanamaker, lived at 1732 Stanton Terrace, just southeast of Barry Farm.
- The Junk Yard Band is a go-go band, founded in the early 1980s at Barry Farm Dwellings.

== See also ==
- Anacostia
- List of public housing developments in the United States
- Public housing in the United States
