= 1835 Paterson textile strike =

Labor dispute in Paterson, New Jersey

The 1835 Paterson textile strike took place in Paterson, New Jersey, involved more than 2,000 workers from 20 textile mills across the city. The strikers, many of whom were children and of Irish descent, were seeking a reduction in daily working hours from thirteen and a half hours to eleven hours. Support from other workers in Paterson and nearby cities allowed the strikers to sustain their efforts for two weeks. Employers refused to negotiate with the workers, and were able to break the strike by unilaterally declaring a reduction in work hours to twelve hours daily during the week and nine hours on Saturdays. Many leaders of the strike and their family were blacklisted by employers in Paterson after it ended.

== Background ==
As the Industrial Revolution got under way, the 1830s were a time of significant labor unrest in the United States. Workers throughout the country had over the previous decade sought to secure shorter working days and higher wages, but many of these efforts and strikes failed. The famous but unsuccessful 1834 Lowell Mill strikes in Lowell, Massachusetts, had garnered widespread public attention and were followed closely by workers in other mill towns. In 1835, construction workers in Boston struck seeking shorter hours. This strike failed as well, despite support from unionists in a number of other cities including Philadelphia, Paterson, and Newark. Inspired by Boston, workers in a number of trades in Philadelphia began a campaign to secure a ten-hour day, and after receiving support from professionals in the city, were almost universally successful.

== Strike ==
Workers in Paterson hoped to achieve similar success to those in Philadelphia. Just before Independence Day, they began a strike demanding shorter hours. They also demanded an end to the use of fines to enforce discipline in the mills, wage withholding, and the company store system in the town. In support of the strikers, an organization called the Paterson Association for the Protection of the Working Class was established. They also received monetary support from workers in Newark and New York City. The strikers were mainly children, mainly female, and many of them were of Irish descent. Due to this last fact, debate around the strike quickly became infused with nativist and anti-immigrant rhetoric, especially from the Lowell Intelligencer, a pro-management newspaper.

Management refused to meet with the strikers, and as a result workers at other mills began to walk out and join in. At its peak, 2000 workers from 20 mills were participating in the strike. In response, employers reduced hours, not to eleven as the strikers wanted, but to twelve on weekdays and nine on Saturday. This reduction broke the strike, and most of the workers returned to the mills. A few strikers continued to hold out for an eleven-hour day, but unsuccessfully. Strike leaders and their families were permanently barred from employment in Paterson, having been blacklisted by the mill owners. Although the strike was broken, it achieved a significant reduction in work hours. According to historians David Roediger and Philip Foner, "...the strike, which added a dozen hours to each worker's weekly leisure, must have been counted a success by the children initiating it."

== See also ==
- 1835 Philadelphia general strike
- 1835 Washington Navy Yard labor strike
- 1913 Paterson silk strike
