= Snow Riot =

1835 race riot in Washington, D.C.

External audio
- "Snow-Storm in August:" D.C.'s First Race Riot, Kojo Nnamdi Show, July 11, 2012
- Larry Slagle speaks on 1835 "Snow Riot", Foundry MEthodist Church, March 15, 2015

The Snow Riot was a riot and lynch mob in Washington, D.C., that began on August 11, 1835, when a mob of angry white mechanics attacked and destroyed Beverly Snow's Epicurean Eating House, a restaurant owned by a black man. This violence, born of white men's frustration about having to compete with free blacks for jobs, touched off several days of white mob violence against free blacks, their houses, and establishments. It stopped only at President Andrew Jackson's intervention.

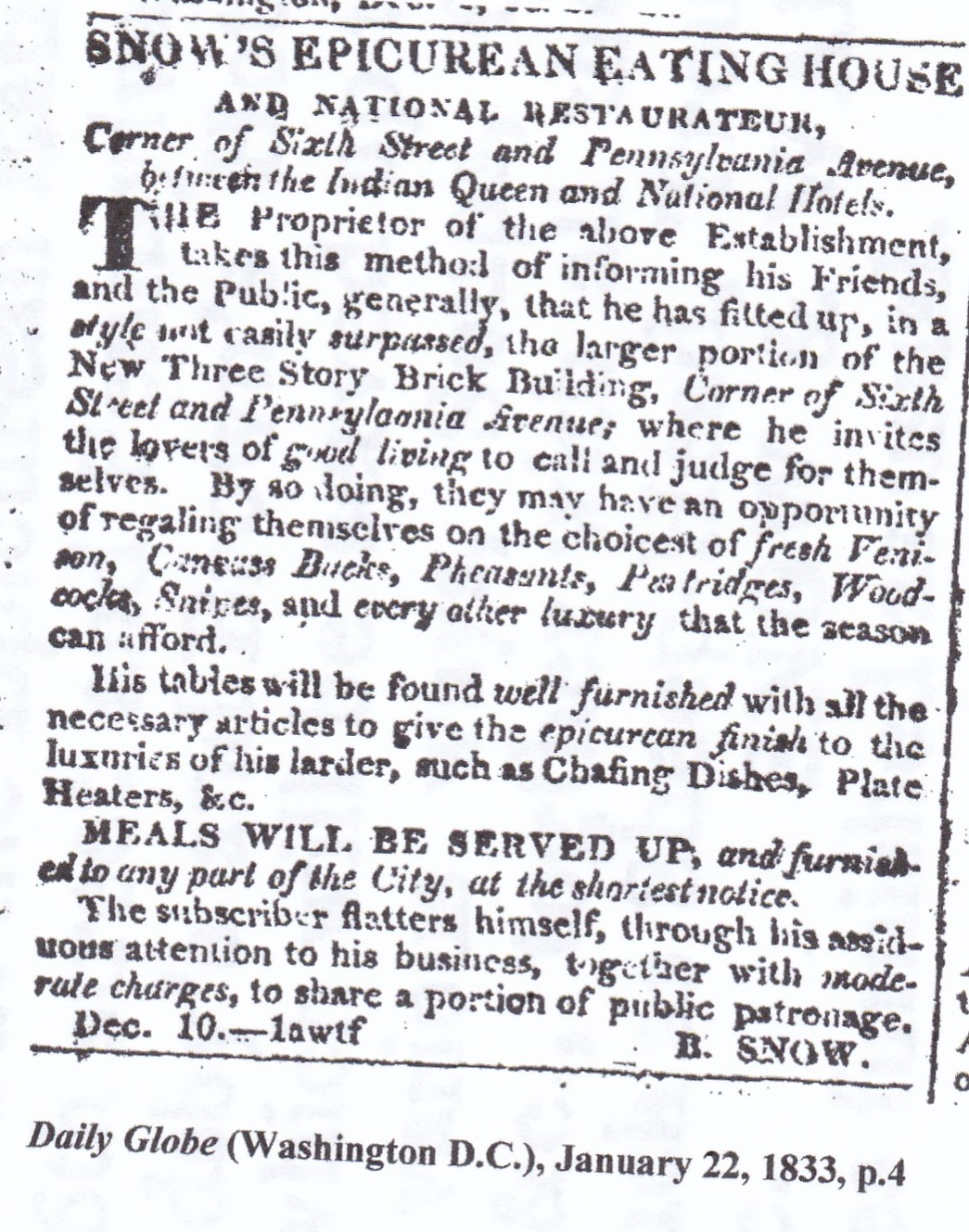

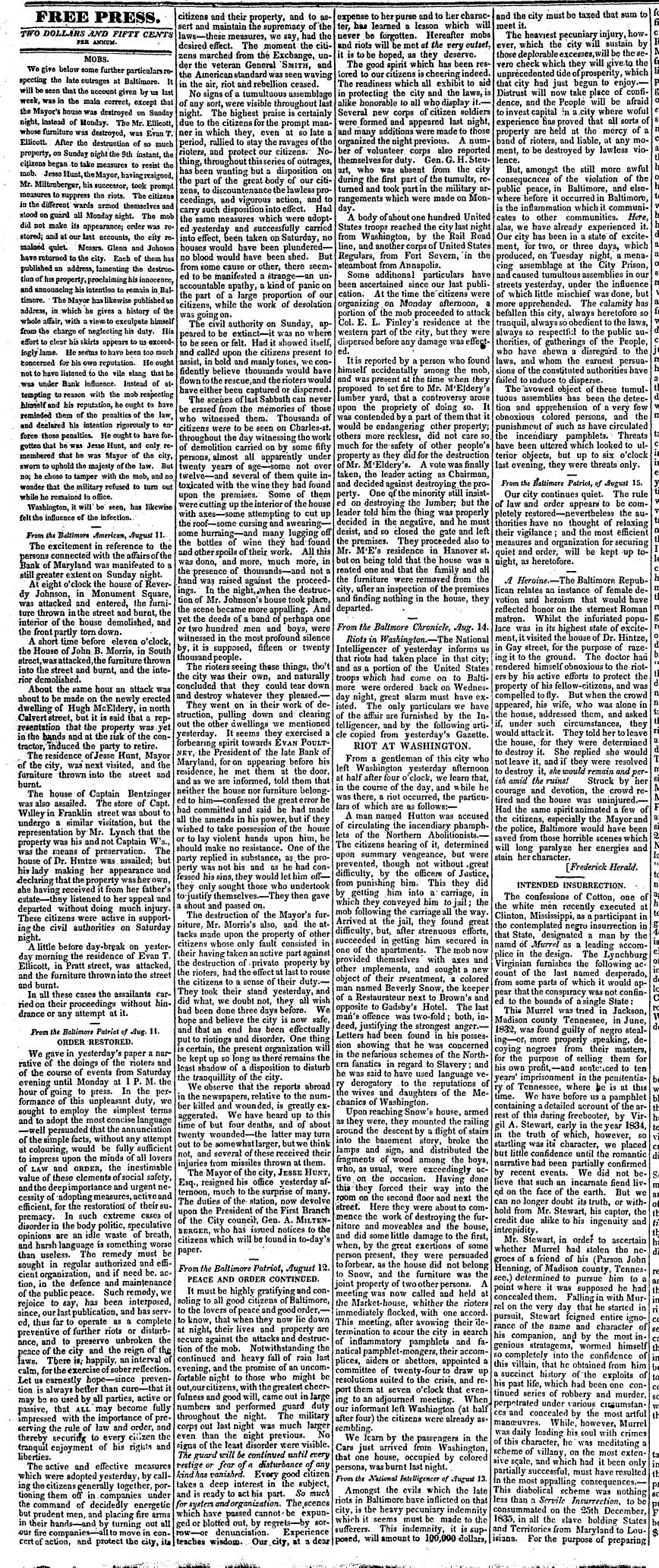
Newspaper on the Snow Riot in 1835

== History ==
In 1835, the city of Washington was facing unprecedented tension between abolitionists and slavery defenders, four years after Nat Turner's slave rebellion and the revolt in Jamaica that had led London in 1833 to end slavery in the British colonies. Turner's uprising had spread panic and fear across the slave states and the District of Columbia. Abolitionists were flooding Congress with petitions to end slavery in the nation's capital, so many that the House adopted a series of gag rules to automatically table them. However, many whites were waiting for their moment to avenge Turner's uprising.

Several events raised tensions further. The first occurred when Arthur Bowen, an enslaved person who was inebriated and bearing an axe, entered the bedroom of his enslaver, Anna Thornton. Bowen did not strike or attempt to strike Thornton. But slavery advocates were enraged by Bowen's opportunity to protest his enslavement. Bowen was ultimately taken into custody without harm; instead, proslavery advocates went after Reuben Crandall, the man they believed was leading the distribution of abolitionist material in Washington. Among them was District Attorney Francis Scott Key, writer of the United States' national anthem, "The Star-Spangled Banner", who pushed for the arrest and prosecution of Crandall. Crandall was found innocent, and the incident publicly embarrassed Key and ended his political career.

The next was the nation's first labor strike by federal employees. The Washington Navy Yard labor strike began on July 29, 1835, after Commodore Isaac Hull responded to thefts by limiting workers' lunch privileges. The strikers wanted a ten-hour day and for Hull to retract his order. The strike, which eventually grew to 175 white mechanics and workers, immediately exposed longstanding racial discord in the Yard.

In an undated diary entry for August 1835, African-American diarist Michael Shiner confirmed intimidation by white workers and their demand that the black caulkers stop work. He wrote, "Commodore Hull ishsared and evry one of them struck and said they wouldnt work anny moore and at the same time they were collered man from Baltimore by the name of Israel Jones a caulker by Trade he was the forman Caulker of those Colerded Caulkers and they were fifteen or twenty of them here at that time Caulkin on the Columbia and the Carpenters made all of them knock oft two."

Many scholars have found a "direct linkage between the Washington Navy Yard strike and riot. National and local events in 1835 combined to bring workers to strike, but longstanding racial fears and anxieties moved the Yard’s white workers to take the lead in the 'Snow Riot'."

"White mechanics and carpenters on strike at the Navy Yard caught wind of a vicious rumor that further inflamed their anger and resentment. They heard a free black restaurateur named Beverly Snow had said something disrespectful about their wives and daughters." Snow's Epicurean Eating House was known for its sophisticated and luxurious food. On August 11, 1835, the mob broke up Snow's restaurant and drank his stock of whiskey and champagne. Snow fled, and the white rioters were unable to locate him.

Shiner, the diarist, wrote of "a Rumor flying around about a colered man by the name of Snow about an expression he had made about the Mechanics wifes god kowes wether he said those things or not and at that time snow kept a Restaurant on the Corner of six street and pennsilvanian west in the cellar and at the time all the Mechanics of classes gathered into snows Restaurant and broke him up Root and Branch and they were after snow but he flew for his life and that night after they had broke snow up they threatened to come to the navy yard after commodore Hull." But they did not come that night and the next day Commodore Hull received orders from the Navy Department from the Hon Secretary of the Navy Mr Levi Woodbury to fortify the yard"?

The strike "quickly morphed into a race riot" as the white striking Navy Yard mechanics and laborers took out their resentment on the black population. Mobs of whites began attacking establishments run by free blacks: schools, churches, and businesses. The pro-slavery United States Telegraph justified the mob's violent actions against free blacks as primarily economic: "The reason of all these attacks on the blacks is, they enter into competition for work at a lower rate." Another individual target was a man named Augustus, who worked at the White House. According to Nicholas P. Trist, Augustus was "a remarkably fine looking mulatto" and when the rioters went to the White House demanding that he "remove Augustus from his position...Jackson refused. His servants were 'amenable to me alone, and to no one else.'" Trist also stated that the rioters had burned buildings in the Kalorama neighborhood.

Josephine Seaton, the daughter of the publisher of the National Intelligencer, William Seaton, reflected in a letter on the strike and subsequent riot: "Snow will certainly be torn to pieces by the mechanics if he be caught, and they are in full pursuit of him. Unfortunately, several hundred mechanics of the navy yard are out of employment, who, aided and abetted by their sympathizers, create the mob, — the first I have ever seen, not recollecting those of Sheffield, and it is truly alarming." Seaton was one of the few observers to see that the strike revealed the corrosive effects of racism on the Navy Yard workforce, as white workers sought to blame their own precarious economic situation on both free and enslaved African Americans.

After days of disorder and riot, President Andrew Jackson ordered a company of U.S. Marines to restore order.

After mediation, the Navy Yard labor strike ended on August 15, 1835. While the striking mechanics were allowed to return to work, they gained little from the strike; the subsequent riot left as part of its legacy a deep and abiding racial mistrust, which would linger. The city's black community, though, were the chief sufferers; they received no compensation for the destruction of their houses and churches. Blacks not only received no sympathy or aid. Moreover, the District Council quickly passed "a new ordinance aimed at them: (they not their attackers) were forbidden to assemble after sundown."

For the next century, the history of the strike and Snow race riot remained an embarrassment to be glossed over and disassociated from the District of Columbia and Washington Navy Yard's official histories.

== Biography of Beverly Snow ==
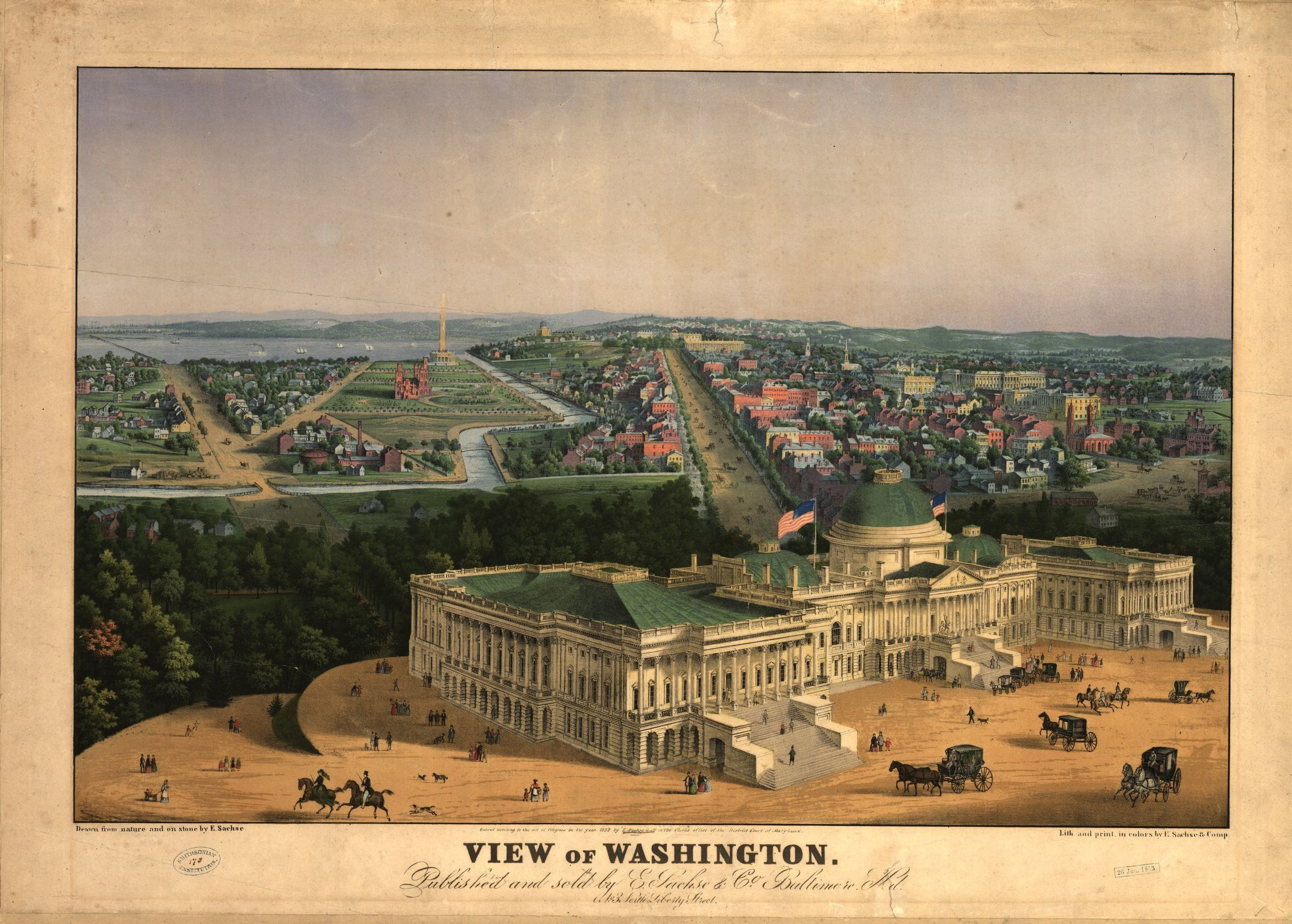
View of Washington in 1852, the Epicurean House would have stood about where the canal turns next to Pennsylvania Avenue

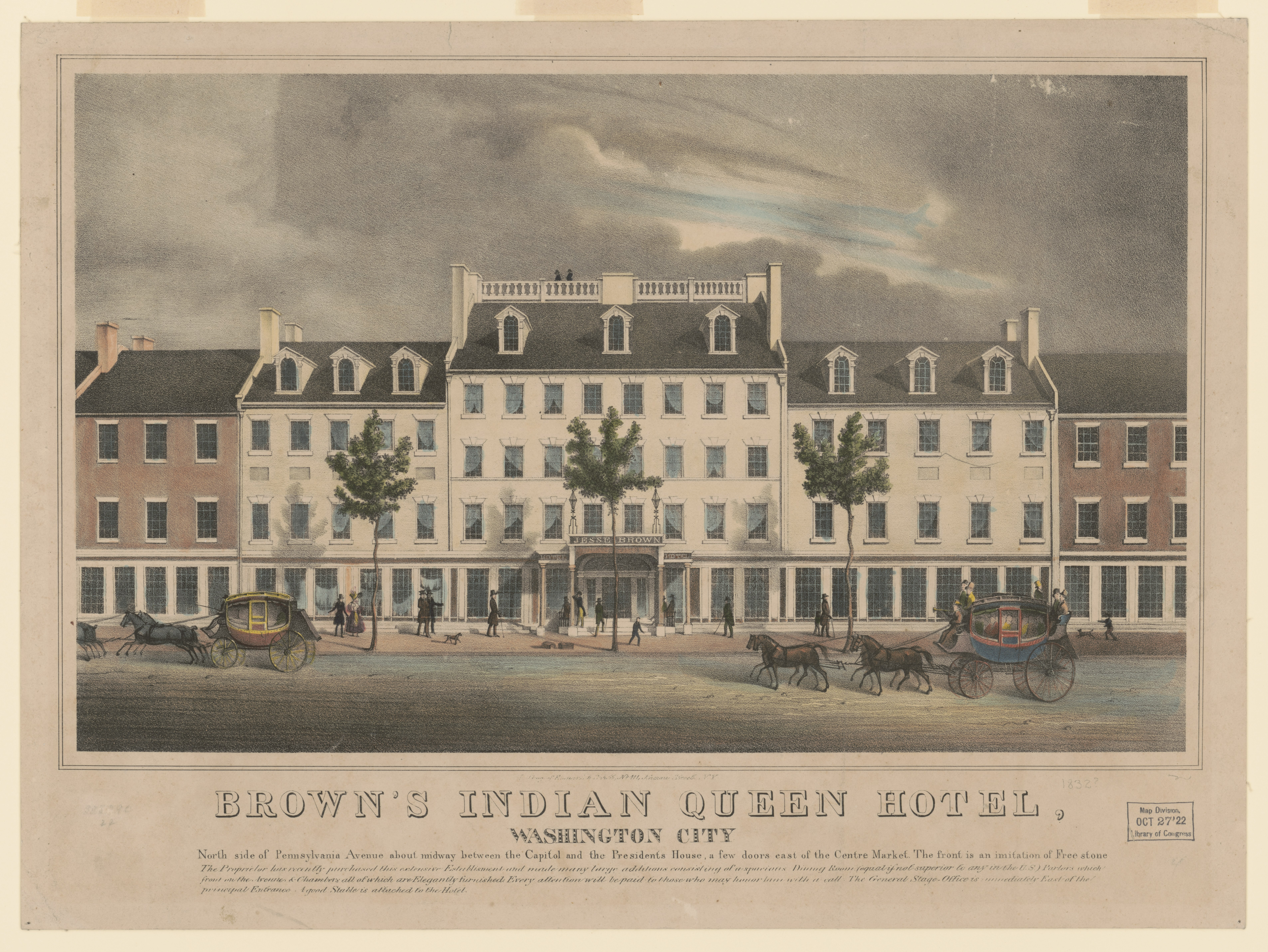
Brown's Indian Queen Hotel in 1832

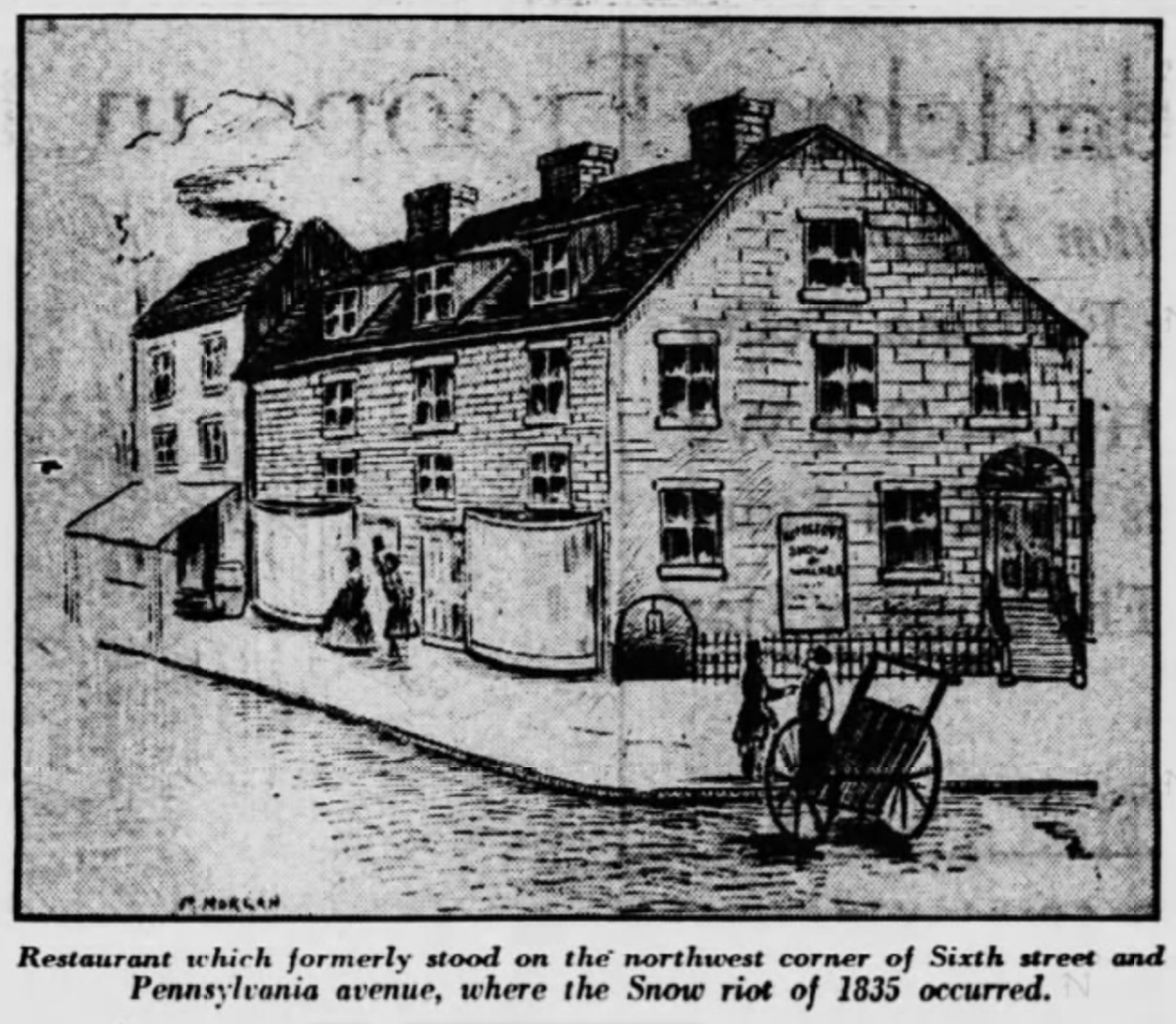
Beverly Snow's Epicurean Eating House, illustrated 1901. The sign reads "Refectory Snow and Walkers".

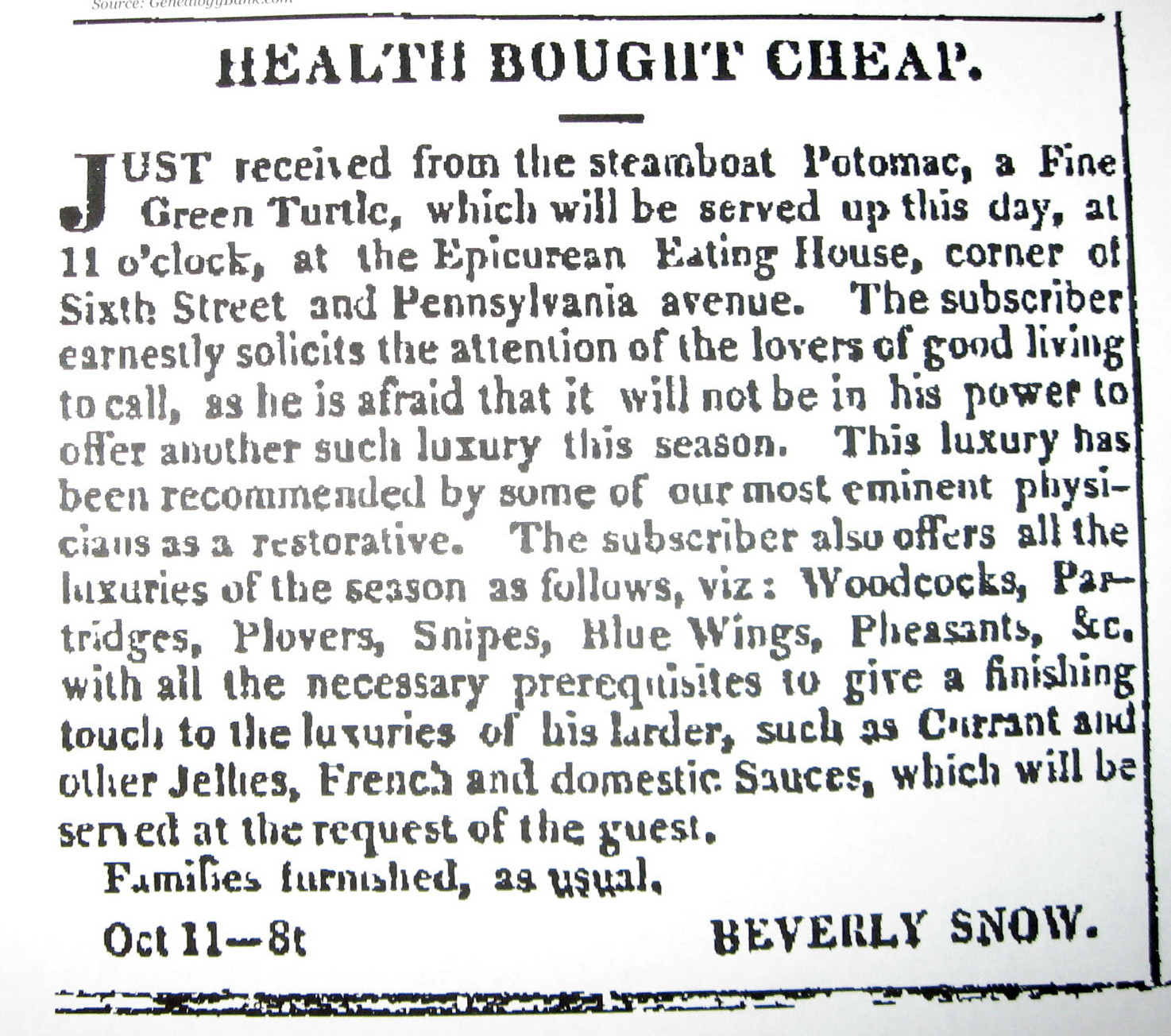
Advertisement for Beverly Snow 's Epicurean Eating House, Washington D.C. Oct 15, 1833 Daily National Intelligencer, p. 2.

Beverly Randolph Snow was born of mixed parentage (he is referred to as a mulatto in various newspapers) in Lynchburg, Virginia, about 1799. He was born enslaved on the estate of Captain William Norvell. By the provisions of Norvell's last will, Snow was given to Norvell's daughter, Susannah Norvell Warwick, with the provision that Snow be manumitted at the age of 30. The Norvell family allowed Snow to operate a small oyster house on Lynch Street in Lynchburg, where he was allowed to keep some of the profits.

He was described in the 1858 Sketches and Recollections of Lynchburg by Its Oldest Inhabitant. Snow warranted an extended footnote, subsidiary to a passage about a band of traveling players:

"This Company came to Lynchburg in considerable style, being conveyed in carriages and buggies, and their wardrobe, &c., being brought in baggage-wagons. But after remaining there twelve months, they prepared to leave the town by going in batteau boats down the river. An inhabitant of the place enquired of Beverly Snow, a well known free colored man, what mode of conveyance the Company designed taking. Whereupon this well known individual, with his customary deferential manner, replied: 'I believe, sir, that the play-actors have concluded to glide smoothly down the stream,' which was certainly one of the greatest euphemisms, under the circumstances, ever uttered in Lynchburg. Beverly Snow was a highly respected free colored man, and, with his worthy wife, Judith Snow, kept an oyster-house at the corner house afterwards occupied by Collins as a saddler's shop. This free man waited, we believe, on Mr. Van Buren whilst President, and he afterwards kept an eating-house in the West."

During this time Snow married a young free woman named Julia. Snow was manumitted in November 1829. He and Julia left Virginia, which had harsh restrictions on free blacks, and moved into the District of Columbia, Washington City. Snow was different than most free blacks, as he was educated, wealthy, successful, and "perhaps even a bit snobbish". He was one of a number of black entrepreneurs who owned businesses in the downtown area. His success was evidence of the strength of Washington's free black population.

In Washington, D.C., Snow opened a popular restaurant, the Epicurean Eating House, located on the corner of 6th Street and Pennsylvania Avenue SE. Snow's restaurant placed emphasis on sophisticated and healthy food cleverly advertised, with the practical message of "Health Bought Cheap." In 1832 he was going to be fined by the city for selling "spiritous liquors" without a license but paid his license fee in time and the city council moved to reverse the fine.

In August 1835, large mobs of white mechanics and laborers rampaged through the District, seeking to destroy property and terrorize free blacks. The mob, composed of mechanics on strike from the Washington Navy Yard, had heard a rumor that Snow had insulted their wives. Furthermore, the mob resented Snow's business success. Large numbers of these rioters entered his restaurant looking for him and proceeded to "bust up the entire facility". While doing so they drank all the whiskey and champagne. The mob later yelled "Now for Snow's house!" Breaking in, they looked for abolitionist literature; finding none, they destroyed the furniture. Unable to find Beverly Snow, the mob attacked black schools and churches. The riot became known as the "Snow Riot" or "Snow Storm."

=== Life after the Snow Riot ===
Snow and his wife, Julia, escaped from the rioters and moved to Toronto, Canada, where he again opened successful restaurants. His first venture was a coffee shop at the corner of Church and Colburn Street. He later opened the Epicurean Recess, then the Phoenix Saloon in 1848, followed by the Exchange Saloon in 1856.

Snow died in Toronto on October 21, 1856. He and Julia are buried in the Toronto Necropolis.

== See also ==
- 1835 Washington Navy Yard labor strike
- List of incidents of civil unrest in the United States
- Jilson Dove – American slave trader (~1783–1853) (and Washington-area restauranteur)

== Bibliography ==
- Asch, C. M. (January 1, 2012). Book Review: Snow-Storm in August: Washington City, Francis Scott Key, and the Forgotten Race Riot of 1835. Washington History, 24, 2, 168–170.
- Cheathem, Mark R. (2014). Andrew Jackson, Southerner. Baton Rouge, Louisiana: Louisiana State University Press. ISBN 978-0-8071-5099-3. LCCN 2012049695. OCLC 858995561. Project MUSE book 26506.
- Dickey, J.D. Empire of Mud The Secret History of Washington DC Lyons Press:Guilford 2014, p. 128.
- Frederick Herald. "Mobs." Virginia Free Press [Charlestown, West Virginia] 20 Aug. 1835: n.p. 19th Century U.S. Newspapers. Web. 11 Nov. 2015.
- Morley, J. (2012). Snow-storm in August: Washington City, Francis Scott Key, and the forgotten race riot of 1835. New York: Nan A. Talese/Doubleday.
- Morley, J. (2013). Snow-storm in August: The struggle for American freedom and Washington's race riot of 1835.
- Shiner, M., Sharp, J. G., & United States. (2008). The Diary of Michael Shiner relating to the History of the Washington Navy Yard 1813-1865. Washington, D.C: Navy Dept. Library.
