= Michael Shiner =

African-American diarist

Michael G. Shiner
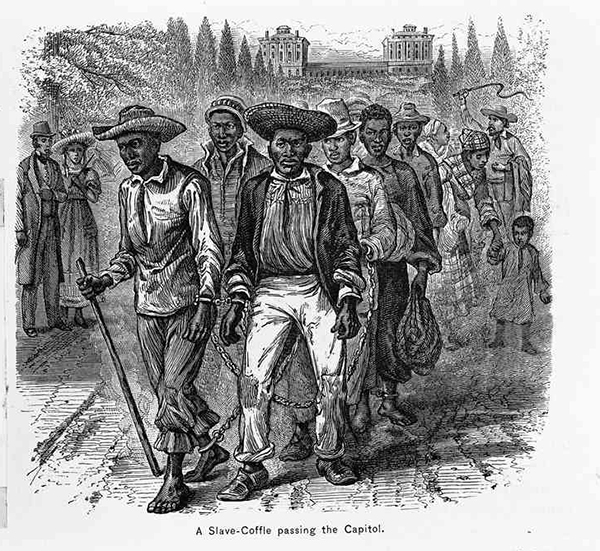
- A coffle of enslaved men in front of the US Capitol in the 1830s
- Born: 1805
- Died: January 16, 1880 (aged 74–75)
- Known for: Diary records of Washington D.C. for more than 60 years

Michael G. Shiner (c. 1805–1880) was an African-American Navy Yard worker and diarist who chronicled events in Washington D.C. for more than 60 years, first as a slave and later as a free man. His diary is the earliest-known by an African American resident of the District of Columbia. The diary has numerous entries which have provided historians a firsthand account of the War of 1812, the British Invasion of Washington, the burning of the U.S. Capitol and Navy Yard, and the rescue of his family from slavery as well as shipyard working conditions, 1835 Washington Navy Yard labor strike, Snow Riot, racial tensions and other issues and events of nineteenth century, military and civilian life.

== Early life, the diary, and education ==
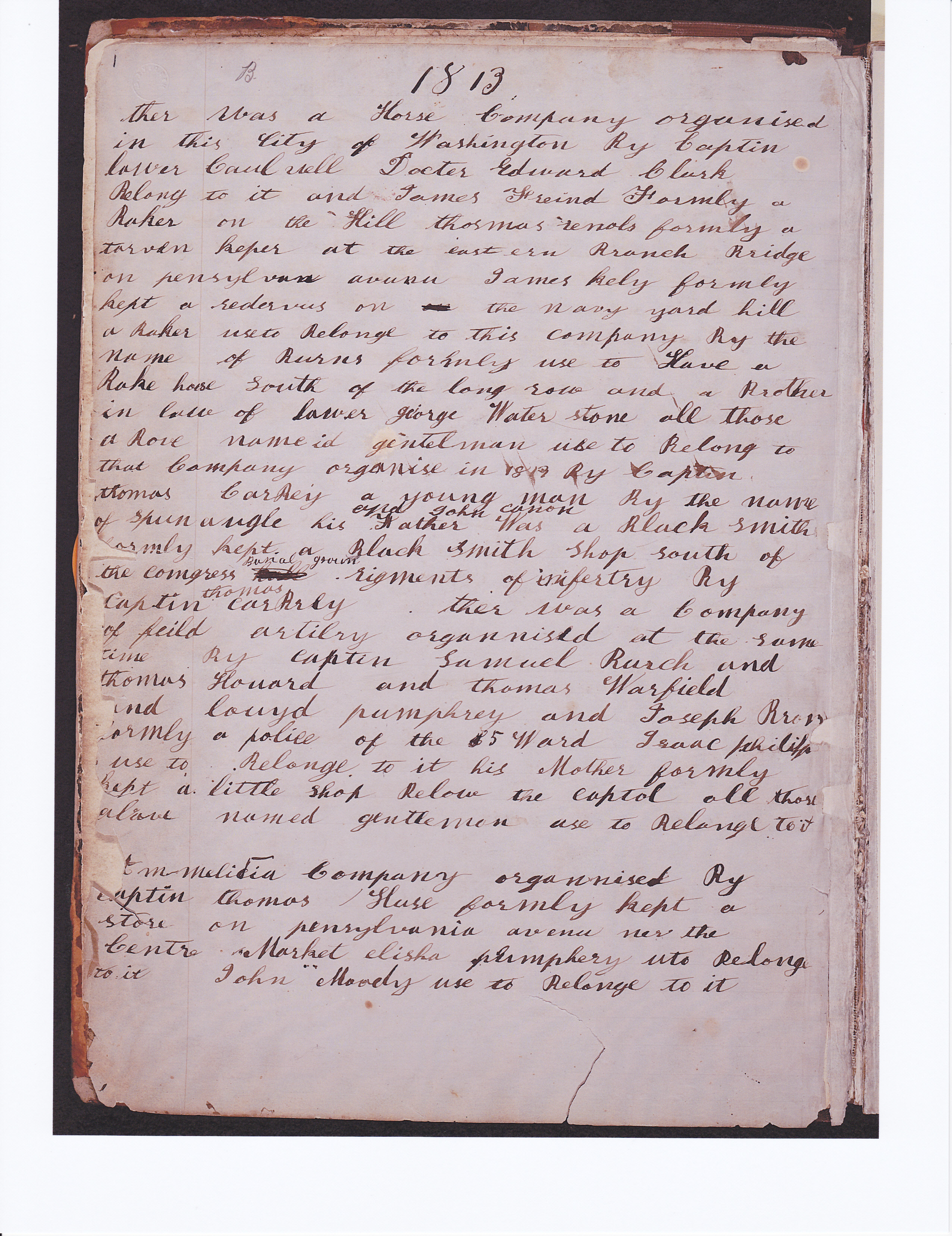
First page of Michael Shiner's Diary, p. 1. 1813.Library of Congress. Militia officer, Lloyd Pumphrey was related to slaveholder William Pumphrey, who first placed Shiner at the navy yard. Thomas Howard was an officer in the District of Columbia militia and "clerk of the yard" In 1828 Howard purchased Shiner for $250.00 as "term slave" from William Pumphrey's estate.

Shiner was born into slavery in 1805 and grew up near Piscataway, Maryland, working on a farm called "Poor Man's Industry" owned by slaveholder William Pumphrey Jr. Around 1813, Pumphrey brought young Shiner into the District of Columbia to serve as a "servant" at his Grant Row lodgings.

His first entries begin in this same year, the year of the British invasion of North America. Shiner however wrote these early entries as recollections (as opposed to contemporaneously) when he was an adult. Although often described as "The Diary of Michael Shiner", the first section of the manuscript is a narrative memoir written and arranged chronologically of the important events he witnessed in his youth. Shiner never called his manuscript a diary, instead he simply inscribed the flyleaf "his book". In his book he concentrated primarily on the significant public events in his life; which he witnessed or read about, combined with some limited but important personal incidents and concerns. In his later years, he may have expanded upon some of the early entries in his diary, adding specifics which were unknown to him as a child.

Shiner wrote using phonetic spelling and little punctuation. Because literacy for blacks outside of religious instruction was discouraged at the time, it is not known with certainty how Shiner learned to read and write. Some historians have speculated that he may have learned from a small school at the Navy Yard run by white abolitionists. The 1870 report of Department of Education of the District of Columbia Special Report however confirms Shiner achieved literacy as an adult:

The Sabbath School among the colored people in those times differed from the institution as organized among whites as it embraced young and old and most of the time was given not to studying of the Bible but to learning to read. It was the only school which for a time they were allowed to enter. First Presbyterian Church of Washington at the foot of Capitol Hill opened a Sunday school for colored people in 1826 which held regular meetings every Sunday evening for years and in it many men women and children learned their alphabet and to read the bible. Michael Shiner one of the most remarkable colored men of the District who remembers almost everything that occurred at the Navy Yard during his service of some 60 years there is of this number.

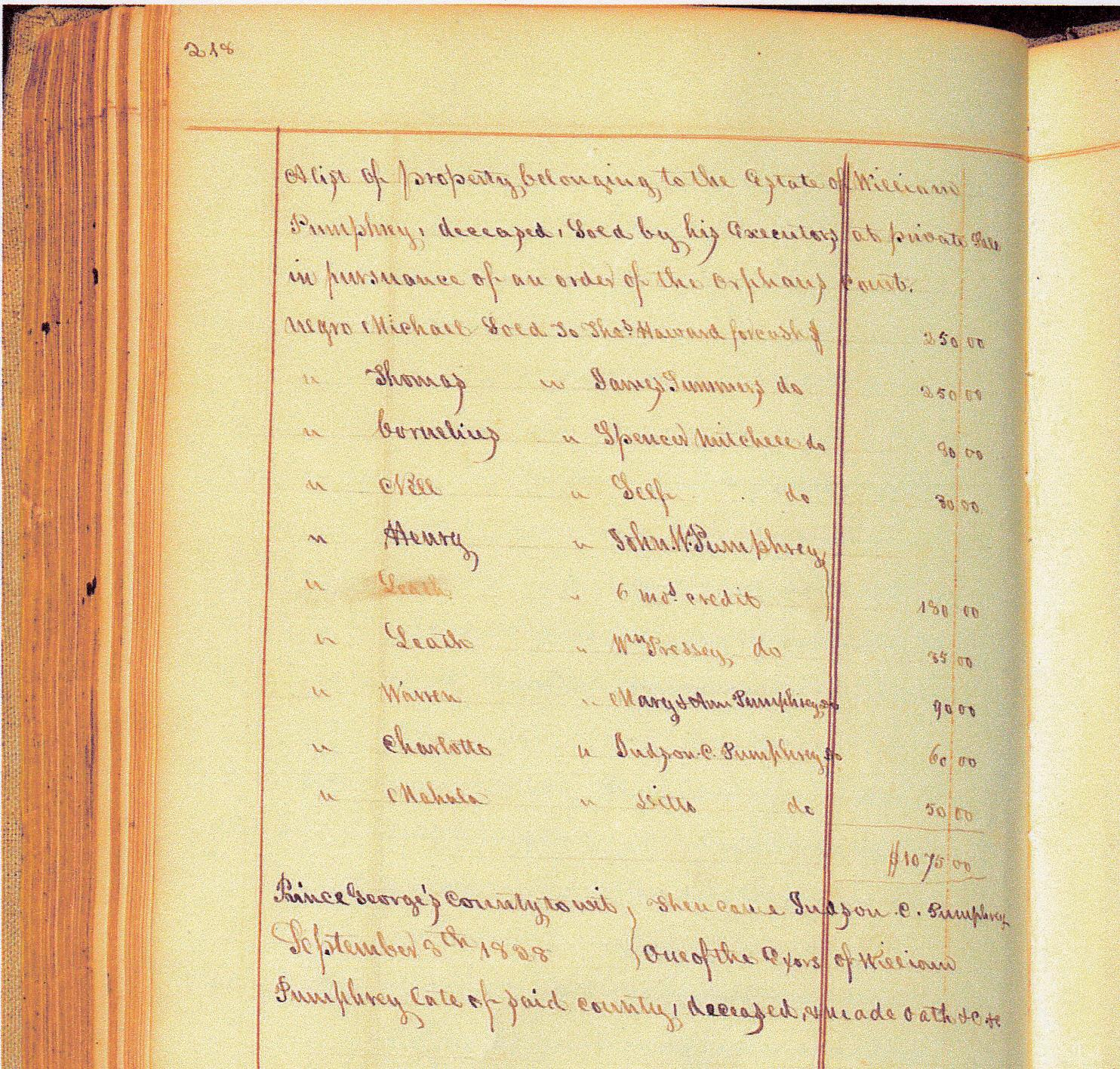
William Pumphrey Sept 8 1828 sale of "Negro Michael" Shiner to Thomas Howard for $250.00

== War of 1812 ==
During The War of 1812 Shiner recollected watching the British invasion of Washington DC: "They looked like flames of fire, all red coats and the stocks of their guns painted with red vermilion, and the iron work shined like a Spanish dollar."

Writing in 1878 he recalled, "At the time of the battle of Bladensburg [ Wednesday 24 August] 1814 I was living with my master near where Grant Row now is in on East Capitol Street ... The British army followed our army and burned first the large dwellings at the corner of 5th and Maryland avenue Gen'l Ross 's horse was shot down from that house. They then burned the buildings then on A Street near the Capitol. I was an eye witness to all this. The British stayed, in Washington until Friday night and then left."

When he and a young companion began to run, they were stopped by Mrs. Reed, an older white woman, who scolded them: "Where are you running you nigger you? What do you think the British want with such a nigger as you?" Shiner's friend hid in a baking oven, but Shiner continued to watch the events unfold. Mrs. Reed was likely echoing white fear in the District, which heightened just before the Battle of Bladensburg 24 August 1814, "by an insistent rumor that a slave revolt had erupted in District of Columbia and the adjoining counties." The rumor was false yet many in the militia fled back into the city to protect their homes furthering the state of apprehension and dread. As the war continued, Shiner described what he saw and learned in great detail. While there was no slave rebellion, the lure of freedom was real. In 1813 Rear Admiral Sir Alexander Cochrane had promised to emancipate slaves who joined their British forces. Some of the enslaved took advantage of the war to escape servitude and join the British forces. One of these men was Archibald Clark enslaved to James Pumphrey 1765 -1832. James Pumphrey as a slaveholder held Michael Shiner's future wife Phillis in bondage and was someone young Michael would have encountered often. During the War of 1812 information regarding Archibald Clark's successful escape to the British may have circulated among the Pumphrey brothers enslaved workforce and to the young Michael Shiner. Archibald Clark was literate and wrote his family and his former "master" from England.

== Marriage and family ==
In his early twenties, Shiner attended a Sunday school run by the First Presbyterian Church of Washington at the foot of Capitol Hill which had opened for free and enslaved blacks in 1826. He also mentions attending Ebenezer Methodist church services in the 1820s. In his day to day activities, Shiner generally kept his literacy secret, and wrote very little of a personal nature. In his Diary, Shiner chose primarily to describe the public events he witnessed in the District and the navy yard. About 1828 Shiner married a 20-year-old woman named Phillis (her surname is unknown), who had been purchased at the age of nine, by William Pumphrey's brother, James Pumphrey who also worked and lived in Washington D.C. The young couple lived together near the naval yard and had six children. Later documentation reflects the Shiner family regularly attended the Ebenezer Methodist Church where they took part in church adult classes for free and enslaved black people. Among those who attended Ebenezer in the 1820s and 1830s with the Shiner's were many employees of the shipyard; both black and white. Black attendees during these years were numerous, and included many community leaders and activists such as: Moses Liverpool, Nicholas Franklin, Thomas Smallwood, Alethia Tanner and Sophia Bell. "The Smallwoods and Shiners were neighbors and almost certainly friends."

== Work at the Navy Yard ==
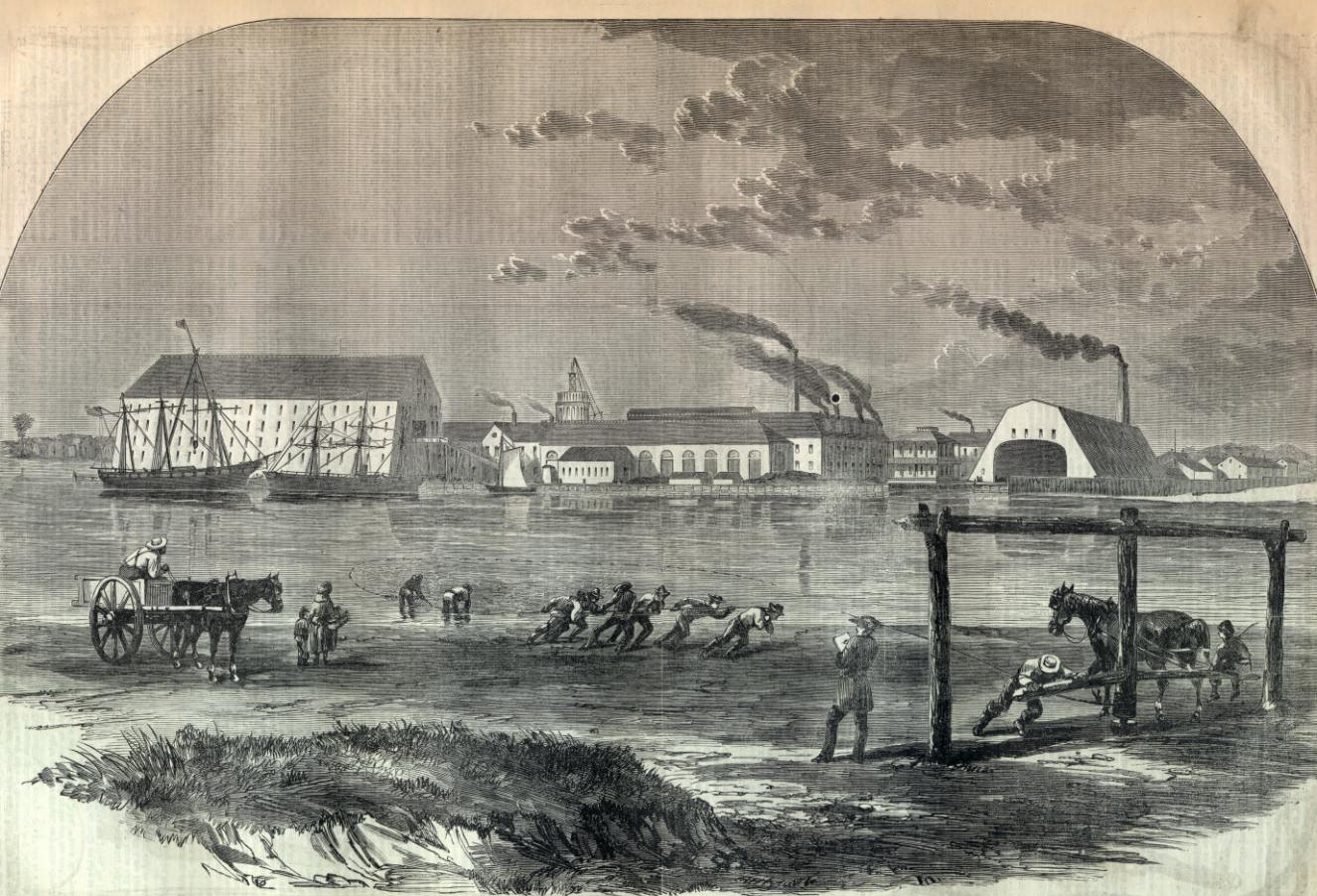
An early illustration of the Washington Navy Yard

From 1800-1830 the Washington Navy Yard was the District's main employer of enslaved African Americans. In 1808, muster lists show they made up one third of the workforce. The number of enslaved workers gradually declined during the next thirty years. William Pumphrey, like many slaveholders, rented his enslaved workers to the Navy Yard. In the "Muster Book of the U.S. Navy in Ordinary at the Navy Yard Washington City", Shiner is recorded as "Ordinary Seaman" with the notation he was first entered on the Ordinary rolls 1 July 1826.

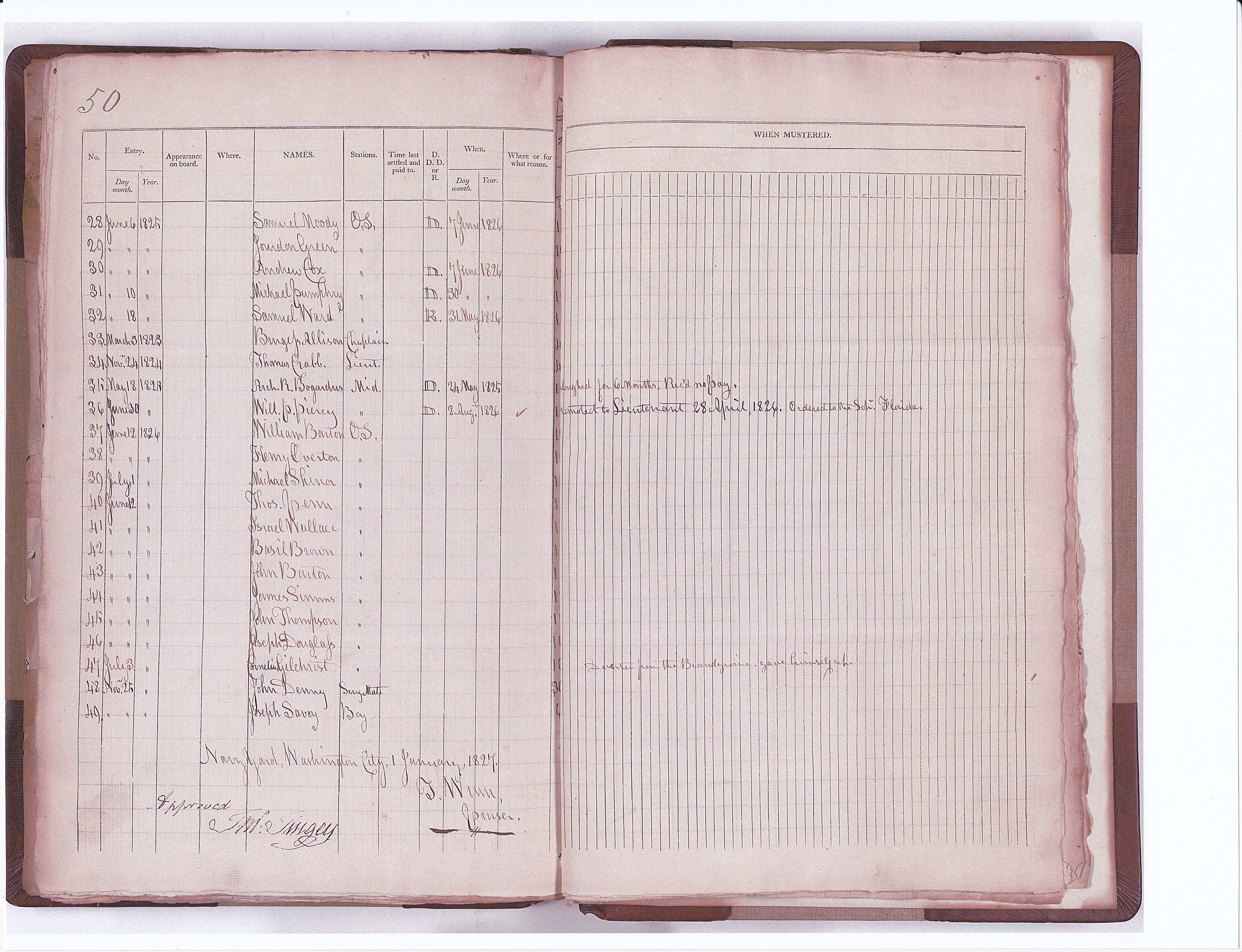
Muster of the Washington Navy Yard Ordinary, dated 1 Jan 1827. Michael Shiner number 39, "O.S." or ordinary seaman, and many of the other individuals enumerated O.S., e.g. Thomas Penn, Basil Brown, John Thompson, and Joseph Savoy were in fact enslaved.Photo National Archives and Records Administration Washington DC

In the early nineteenth century naval shipyard, the Ordinary was where naval ships were held in reserve, or for later need. Ships in Ordinary normally were older vessels awaiting restoration that had minimal crews of semi-retired or disabled sailors who remained on board to make sure that the vessels were kept in usable condition, provided security, kept the bilge pump operating, and ensured the lines were secure. Here enslaved African Americans worked as seamen, cooks, servants or laborers, performing many of the most unpleasant and difficult jobs. The work they did included scraping the hull, moving timber, and helping to suppress fires. Their wages were paid directly to their owners. At the navy yard enslaved workers were given limited medical treatment per the Secretary of the Navy's 1813 letter. This emergency medical care was provided solely to reassure and preserve the slaveholders property. Michael Shiner was treated on at least two occasions 1827 and 1829 for "fever". As an enslaved laborer Shiner's movements were on occasion carefully observed and recorded in the navy yard station log i.e. 27 and 28 December 1828.

At the Washington Navy Yard the names of enslaved men like Michael Shiner, were routinely entered on to military muster rolls as "ordinary seamen" to avoid congressional oversight. Shiner recounts "We belonge to the ordinary at that time..." in his entry for 6 September 1835. This subterfuge was a common device used by slaveholders, Michael Shiner's for example is enumerated number 39, on the Washington Navy Yard muster dated 1 January 1827, his rating is given as Ordinary Seaman or O.S., see thumbnail. Many of the others listed on the same document e.g.Thomas Penn, Basil Brown, John Thompson, and Joseph Savoy were also enslaved. This was a common ploy, Charles Ball at Washington Navy Yard and George Teamoh at Norfolk Navy Yard, both record similar experiences.In 1845 Commodore Jesse Wilkerson Commandant of the Norfolk Navy Yard confirmed the wide spread practice to Secretary of the Navy George Bancroft "It is my duty, however to appraise the Department, that a majority of them are negro slaves, and that a large portion of those employed in the Ordinary for many years, have been of that description, but by what authority I am unable to say as nothing can be found in the records of my office on the subject.

=== Working conditions ===
In the diary, Shiner, who worked as a laborer and painter helper, chronicled the daily routine at the Navy Yard, providing important significant details of early working conditions and social attitudes at the Yard toward slaves and freeman. He records one incident where he was surrounded by a mob of thugs who "lit me up torch fashion with firecrackers" and another where he had to flee a gang of sailors who mistook him for a runaway slave. Other incidents he recounted included nearly drowning after falling in the freezing water and seeing a fellow worker accidentally decapitated while working.

=== Unusual weather ===
Like many people who worked at the navy yard Shiner paid attention to the elements and is careful to record unusual weather such as the Year Without a Summer of 1816. For that year, he wrote of the extreme cold, the unusual formations on the sun and crop failures, "wher a hard Winter for they Wher three black spots in the sun after the Winter closed the sun become to as red as blood ther Wher a frost every night the hold summer the Where no corn Made scarrly aBout in different section of the country it Where all Whitherd up." Weather was of particular concern since most employees enslaved and free worked outdoors regardless of the weather. In 1829 he records: "went out to the fire at that time a little before the bell rang for twelve and stayed at the garrison until between 1 and 2 o'clock in the night and the coldest night i ever felt in my life the hose were led from the garrison to reservoir at the market house it were so cold that the hose freeze up they formed lines in different sections passed the water with a bucket to the fire they worked like men there were a little Disturbance occurred between a fire[men] from the city and Samuel Brigs a firemen[sic] of the an a casta [Anacostia River] But that was soon settled by captain Wm Easby interfering Which at that time were Master Boat Builder of the Washington Navy yard that Wher a Hard Winter they wasn't 2 cord of Wood on the commercial Wharf they wasn't no Wood in the navy yard [ illegible] and they were not ten ton of coal in the yard they were condemn from War" He also noted celestial phenomena e.g. Leonids meteor showers Nov. 12 1833: "The Meteors fell from the elements the 12 of November 1833 on Thursday in Washington. It frightened the people half to death." On another occasion Shiner chronicled the Solar Eclipse of 1831.

=== 1835 Labor Strike and Snow Riot ===
Shiner also described military/civilian relationships and the efforts of early federal workers for better pay and employment conditions, including the 1835 Washington Navy Yard labor strike, which disintegrated into the Snow riots, a race riot of whites against blacks that was finally brought under control by President Andrew Jackson and the U.S. Marines. Writing in July 1835, Shiner recounts how white mechanics through threats intimidated black caulkers into quitting work on the USS Columbia: "and they wher fifteen or twenty of them here at that time Caulkin on the Col lumbia and the Carpinters made all of them knock oft two." He added that a group of striking white navy yard mechanics went after free black restaurant owner Beverley Snow and later threatened to attack Commodore Isaac Hull: "all the Mechanics of classes gathered into snows Restaurant and broke him up Root and Branch and they were after snow but he flew for his life and that night after they had broke snow up they threatened to come to the navy yard after commodore Hull."

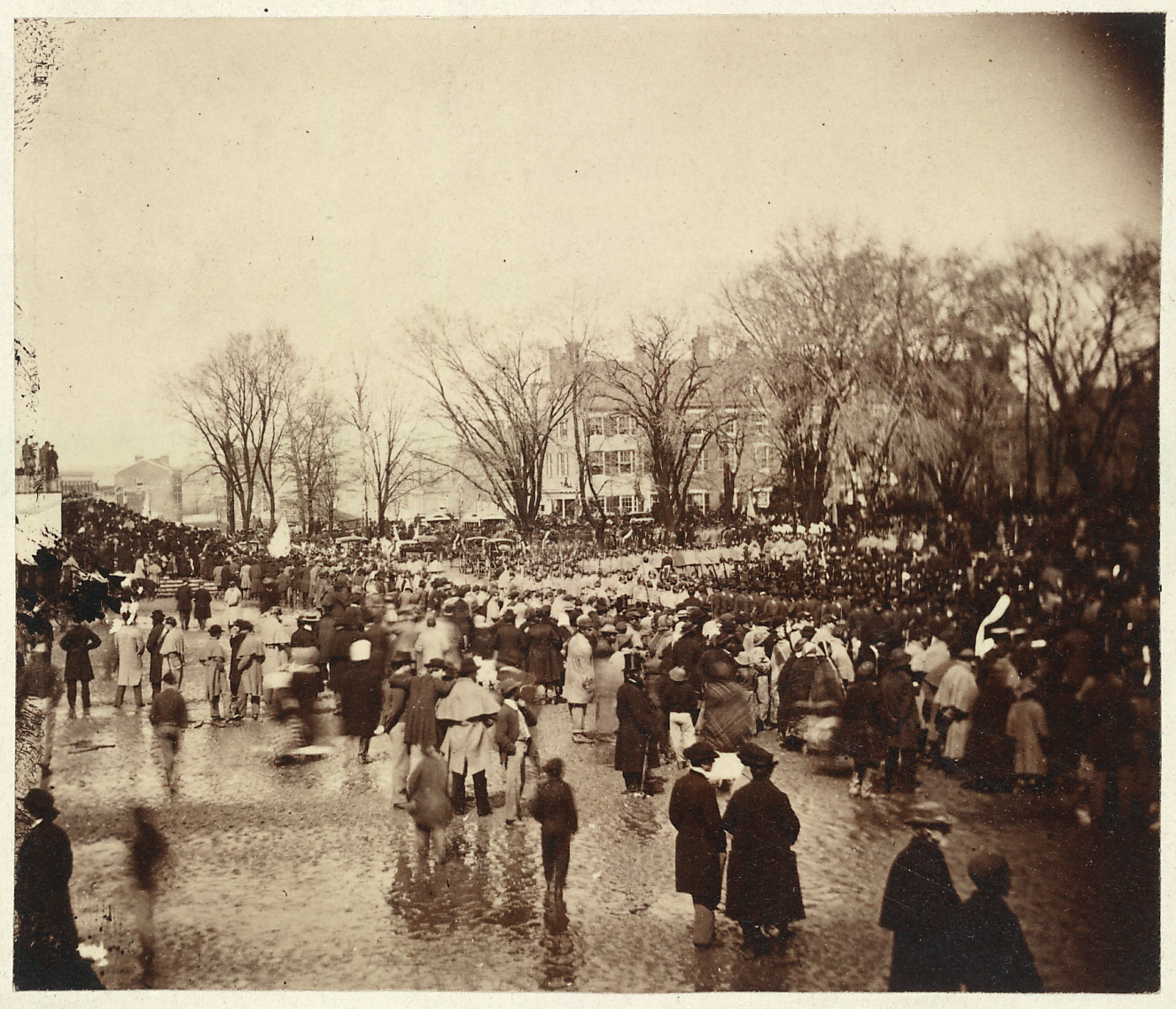
Large crowd and black troops at Lincoln's second inauguration, March 4, 1865; with, as author Tonya Bolden has suggested, "perhaps Michael Shiner."

=== Abraham Lincoln ===
Shiner enjoyed the public events of the capitol and attended nearly all presidential inaugurations from John Quincy Adams to Abraham Lincoln's 2nd inaugural. At Lincoln's second inaugural, Shiner related the size of the large crowd, and the unusual weather, with rain and overcast skies. Then he noted as President Lincoln stepped out onto the East Portico to deliver his soon-to-be famous address: "And on the fourth of March 1865 on Saturday the hon Abraham Lincoln taken his Seat Before he Came out on the porch to take his [seat] the wind blew and it rained with out intermission and as soon as Mr Lincoln came out the wind ceased blowing and the rain ceased raining and the Sun Came out and it was near as clear as it could be and calm and at the mean time there was a Star made its appearance west rite over the Capitol and it Shined just as bright as it could be ..." On 14 April 1865 after learning of Lincoln's assassination by Confederate sympathizer John Wilkes Booth, Shiner "clearly connected himself to the catastrophic event". He wrote "Hon abraham Licoln [Lincoln] was assassinated on the 14 of April on good Friday knight at fords theater in washing[ton]and he died on the 15 of April 1865 on Saturday. "And on Friday evening before he was assassinated Mr Lincoln and his Lady where Both down at the Washington navy on good Friday the 14 1865."

== Slavery and freedom ==
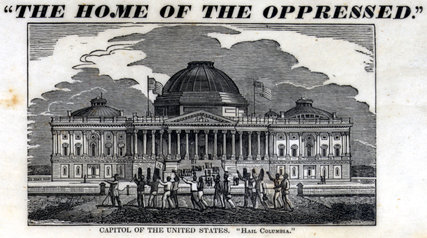

When William Pumphrey died in 1827, he stipulated in his will that all eight his slaves were to be sold as "term slaves" for a specific period of time, and afterwards manumitted. Michael Shiner was to be freed, after another fifteen years of enslavement . William Pumphrey's manumissions may have been prompted by his Methodist faith, but more likely they served to insure the solvency of his estate by promising his bondsmen; freedom after a specified time thus precluding fear of a massive slave sale and a follow on movement into the deep south. Pumphrey had used prospective manumission as early as November 1816 when he sold two women: Sarah Shins age 38, and her daughter Ellen Shins to a fellow slaveholder in the District of Columbia. Shiner was subsequently bought by Thomas Howard, clerk of the Navy Yard in 1828 for $250. When Thomas Howard died in 1832, his will stipulated that Shiner be "...manumitted and set him free, at the expiration of eight years,[1836] if he conducted himself worthy of such a privilege". The estate inventory enumerated Shiner as "Black Man, M.Shiner, Slave for four years [value] $ 100".

On 3 March 1833, William Pumphrey 's brother, slaveholder James Pumphrey, died. Following James' death, Shiner writes that his wife Phillis and their three children "wher snacht away from me and sold" on the street of Washington by slave dealers and confined to a slave pen in Alexandria. In fact Levi Pumphrey the estate heir was trying to sell Phillis and her children to settle estate debts. Levi Pumphrey had sold Phillis Shiner and her children to the notorious slave dealers John Armfield and Isaac Franklin who planned to move the Shiner's into the deep South via the Natchez trace. Slaveholder Levi Pumphrey was remembered by a former slave as "a perfect savage" he had close connections to slave dealers and owned a tavern at the corner of 6th and C street which was used by notorious slave dealers William Robey and Robert W. Fenwick as their place of business. Phillis Shiner was fortunate to secure the help of noted attorney Francis Scott Key, who filed a Petition For Freedom in District of Columbia Circuit Court, case of Phillis Shiner, Ann Shiner, Harriet Shiner and Mary Ann Shiner vs. Levi Pumphrey dated 1 May 1833.

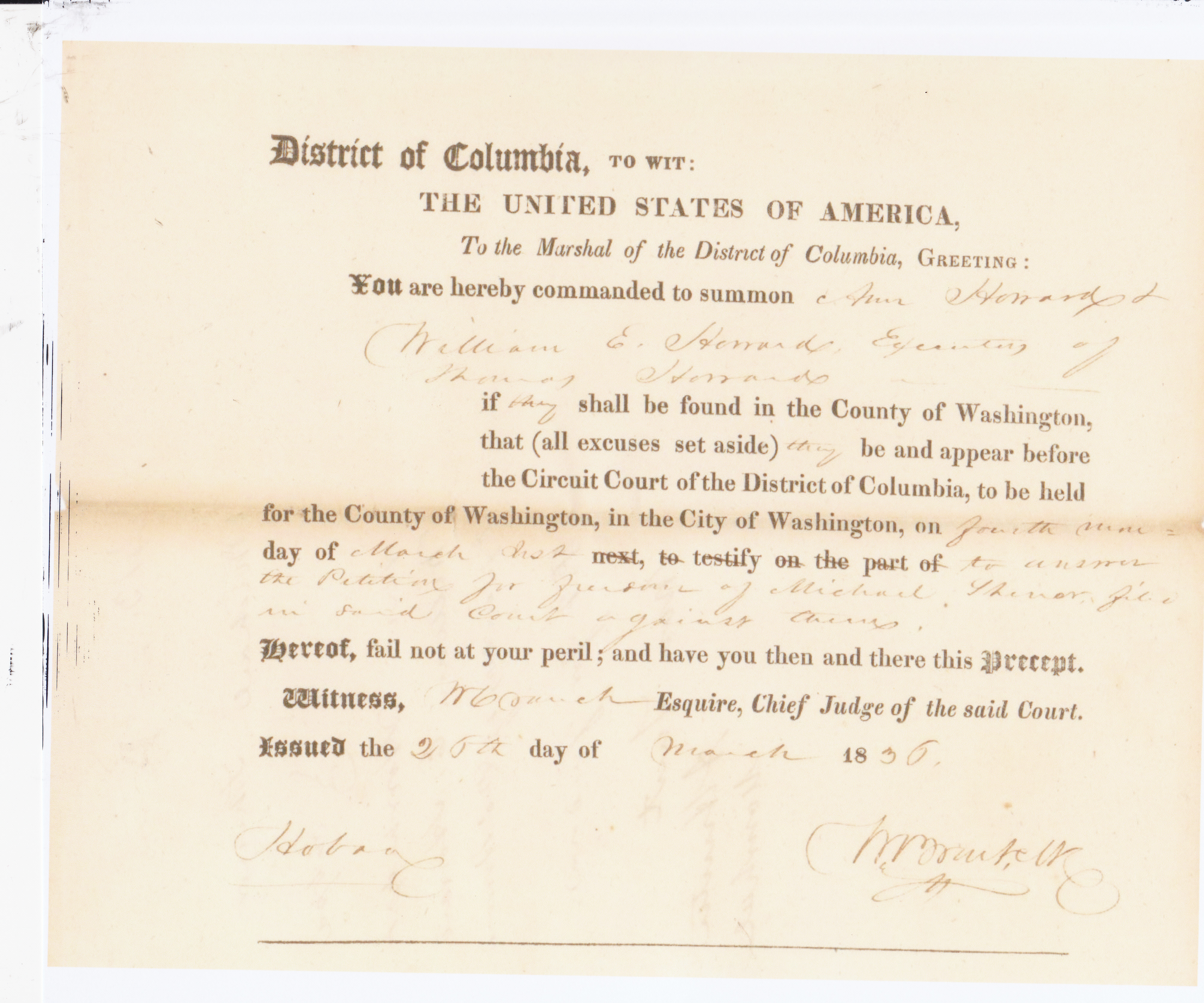
1836 Petition for Freedom by Michael Shiner to the District of Columbia Circuit Court. Source: National Archives and Records Administration RG 71 records of the Circuit Court

The petition stated "Phillis Skinner [Shiner], who sues for herself & her infant children Ann, Harriet & Mary Ann, complains of Levi Pumphrey, in custody &c of a plea of Trespass for this, to wit, that the said deft. on the day of at the County aforesaid, with force & arms, to wit with clubs, knives, sticks, & fists, made an assault upon the plffs & them her the said plffs did then & there beat, wound, & ill-treat & other injuries to the planiffs then & there did against the peace of the U. States & to the damage of the plffs" and placed in the firms slave prison, at Alexandria. After being held a few weeks in the Alexandria slave prison with help from Key and other wealthy and powerful connections; Phillis and the three children were declared free by manumission. "In a hierarchical slave city like Washington, the involvement of such influential white men was invaluable, and the forging of this powerful network of allies was only possible through Shiner's work in the Navy Yard."

When Shiner concluded Thomas Howard's heirs were defaulting on his promised manumission, he tenaciously pursued his own freedom. On 26 March 1836 in the Circuit Court of the District of Columbia he filed a petition for freedom with the help of attorney James Hoban Jr., declaring that he was "unjustly, and illegally held in bondage" by the executors of Thomas Howard's estate, Ann Nancy Howard and William E. Howard.

By 1840, Michael Shiner and his family were listed in the census as "free colored". As a freeman he continued to work at the Navy Yard as a painter where he was able to save money and provide for his family. The 1840 census confirms Shiner's freedom, for he and his family, were enumerated as "Free Color". Michael as the head of the family is the only inhabitant listed by name, his surname is given as "Shoner", male, between age 36–54 years of age, with the family listed as one female (Phillis) age 25-35, and three children. Shiner himself, worked as painters helper, "at the Navy Yard in the paint shop, grinding colors" until some time after 1870.

== Family and property ==
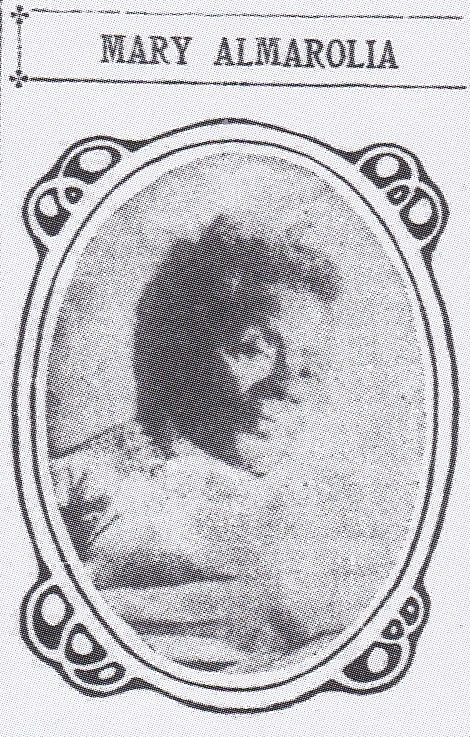
Photo of Mary Ann Shiner Almarolia, daughter of Michael Shiner, Washington Times (Washington, D.C.) September 5, 1904, p. 10

Shiner's wife Phillis died some time before 1849. In 1850 Michael Shiner was enumerated by the U.S. Census for the District of Columbia, as Michael, age 46, living in Washington DC with his second wife Jane Jackson, aged 19, and children Sarah E., age 12 Isaac M., age 5 and Braxton, age 0, (infant below first birthday). Shiner's new marriage may have complicated his financial situation with his children or stepchildren. On 13 November 1849, he placed a notice in the Daily National Intelligencer, stating he would," pay no debts contracted in my name by either of my children, and threatening legal action "on any person or persons who may harbor or traffic them with or without my knowledge." In the 1860 U.S. Census, the Shiner family were enumerated as: Michael G. Shiner, age 55, (colored), born Maryland, occupation painter, real estate $800.00, wife Jane Jackson Shiner, age 29, children Sarah, age 21, Isaac M,. age 15, Rose Ann, age 8 and Jane M. age 3. This is the first of a number of documents which list his name as "Michael G. Shiner."

Michael G. Shiner, although free, with steady employment and a property owner, still found he and his family lived in precarious balance. Although free blacks, they were subject to the infamous Black Code and the prejudice and discrimination of the era. All this left them exposed to daily indignities and false accusations, with little recourse. Through the introduction of “Black Codes,” which sought to solidify slavery as an institution and to strengthen the concept of racial segregation in the city, free blacks such as the Shiner family were required to carry freedom papers such as manumission documents, without which they could be stopped and placed in the city jail. One of the methods black parents used to legally protect their children, was to indenture them as apprentices. Michael Shiner utilized this method on 13 November 1849, when he placed a notice in the Daily National Intelligencer stating Samuel N. Jackson (a relative of his second wife, Jane Jackson) was his indentured apprentice.

One startling example occurred on 7 January 1861 when the Washington Evening Star, ran a story that "Mike Shiner and his wife(colored) had been arrested on suspicion, and warrants have been issued against he others supposed to be implicated in the burglary". A similar story ran the following day in the Daily National Republican, this titled provocatively " Robbery and Arson" and stated, " a colored man living in the neighborhood, by the name of Mike Shiner, and his wife were arrested on suspicion, but his premises being examined and nothing found and evidence of guilt appearing against his, he was released. On 9 January 1861, the Evening Star, admitted they had printed " The Wrong Name" and "explaining shamefacedly", "it was Joe Shiner not Mike Shiner, who was arrested at the Navy Yard that night." They then added "Mike Shiner is a very respectable colored man, an employee in the Navy Yard, his house was searched but nothing against him was discovered and he was discharged."

After the Civil War, Shiner prospered, was active in the Republican Party and became an outspoken champion of black rights. One indication of Shiner's prosperity is found in the 1870 U.S. Census for Washington D.C. On that document Michael Shiner is enumerated as “ Michael Schnier ” age 65, occupation, painter, value of real estate: $4000.00 (~$87,290 in 2024). During these years Shiner's daughter Mary Ann Shiner Almarolia (1833-1904), was "a well known character whom many regarded as a remarkable women." She married an Italian immigrant, Alexander Almarolia and with him managed a hotel and saloon. Mary Ann (see thumbnail) also became a registered midwife and a subject of gossip for her flamboyant lifestyle, alleged wealth, living openly with her spouse as an interracial couple and for leaving her large estate to her two white stepsons.

== Business and politics ==
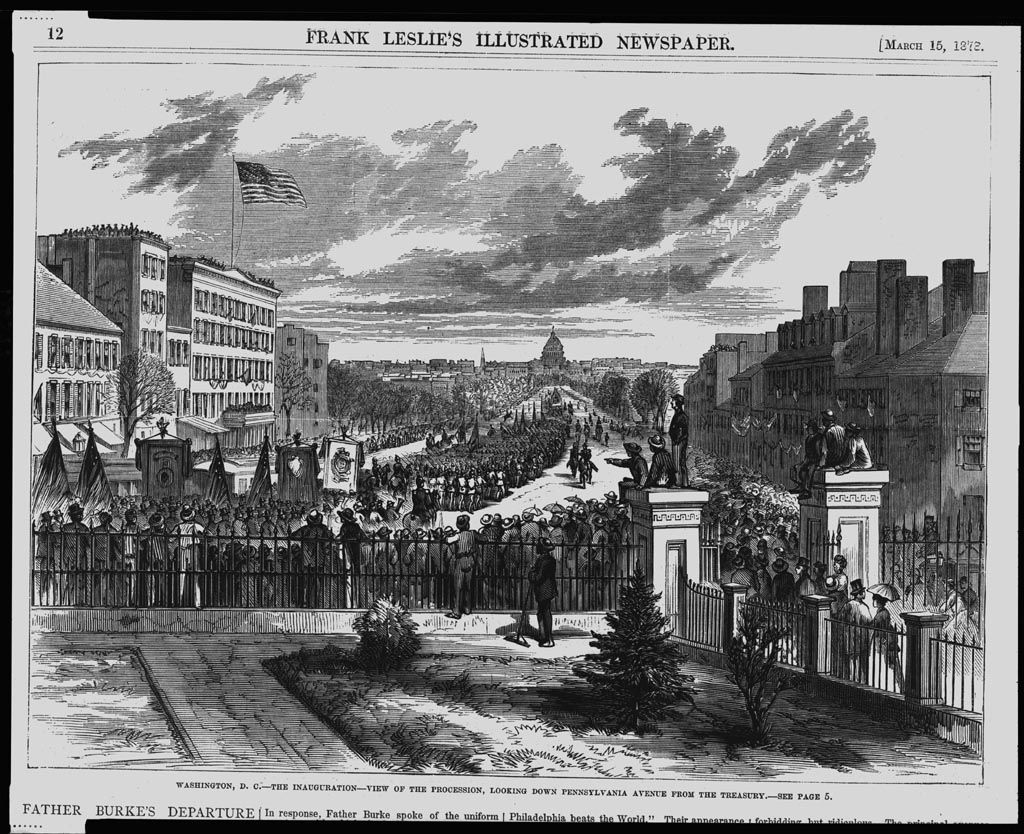
Shiner took part in many political events of Washington D.C., including The Inaugural Procession of Ullyses S Grant. View of the Procession looking down Pennsylvania Avenue from the Treasury.

Politically, Shiner was known to take " an active part in local politics of East Washington in suffrage times." and was a strong supporter of the Republican Party where he served on various campaigns and committees. In September 1871, he successfully bid on and received a contract from the District of Columbia, Board of Public Works, to gravel 11th Street East and lay sidewalks on the same street. This contract were let during the administration of Alexander Robey Shepherd, Governor of the District of Columbia. In the 1872 Shepherd's political enemies gained power and accused him and his supporters, of corruption. As part of an inquiry before the House of Representatives, Shiner was summoned to give testimony regarding a road contract that he had won. Shiner was not intimidated and firmly denied any wrongdoing by himself or Shepherd. Shiner began his testimony by stating,"I am a laboring man in the paint shop of the Washington Navy Yard." He continued by affirming, that he had received the road contract on his own merits, and that he had made application in the same manner as all the other bidders and that he also still owned the contract. Shiner acknowledged before the House committee, that he knew both Alexander Shepherd and his father, and that he believed them to be honest men. When asked if he thought Alexander Shepherd was an honest man ? He replied simply, "He is a gentleman."

Following emancipation Shiner and his son Isaac both took an active part in the civic life and politics of the District of Columbia. Both men marched in the 4 March 1869 inaugural procession of President elect Ulysses S. Grant. Shiner was also an annual presence at the anniversary of the Emancipation Proclamation of the District of Columbia, District of Columbia Compensated Emancipation Act. Shiner though gradually grew disenchanted with the Republican Party's persistent failure to protect the rights of newly freed blacks. Addressing the Sixth Ward Republicans in March 1869, Shiner called for prompt action while the Congress was in session by the Secretary of the Navy to protect jobs at the navy yard. He was particularly concerned that Rear Admiral Charles Henry Poor in charge of the shipyard, was opposed to employing blacks or their white friends. Speaking at meeting of the Twenty -first District Republican Club, in objection to a motion Shiner, spoke bluntly, informing the gathering ..." the only master he had now was the Constitution, and he intended to abide by the laws." At another party gathering, he "addressed the meeting on the rights of black men to identify themselves with any party which would act most honest by them. They were now in the hands of an unprincipled clique, who were maneuvering for the interests of "thieving". He then told the group "Michael Shiner has never sold out and never will be found to sell out" During the Civil War Shiner's son Joseph C. Shiner,(1836–1868) served as a private in the 3rd U.S. Colored Infantry.

== Death ==
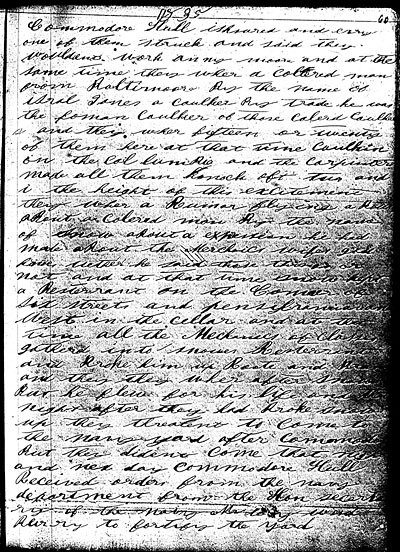
Diary of Michael Shiner page 60 recounting the Washington Navy Yard Strike of 1835

Michael G. Shiner died of smallpox on 17 January 1880. He was buried the next day, in the segregated Beckelts Cemetery AKA Union Beneficial Association Cemetery, located on C Street, SE, Washington D.C. On 19 January 1880, the Evening Star published a front-page obituary of Shiner, writing that Shiner was "a well known colored man..." and that he had "...the most retentive memory of anyone in the city, being able to give the name and date of every event which came under his observation, even in his boyhood."

After his death, the Shiner manuscript passed to his wife Jane Jackson Shiner, who with daughter Mary Ann Shiner Almarolia, filed the necessary papers to probate the estate. Following Jane Jackson Shiner's death, the estate went to Mary Ann Shiner Almarolia. The New York Sun reported, that a few weeks after Mary Ann's death in 1904, "... papers were found in her room directing her white foster son, Louis Alexander ... to open a locked wood box, wherein would be found important documents. Among the papers concealed in this box were two quarto volumes in manuscript, containing an old Negro's personal recollections of Washington - the place and the people in the period from 1813 to 1868." Louis Alexander apparently sold one of the volumes to a "U.S. Army captain W.H. Crowley for $10.00." This volume subsequently came into the possession of the Library of Congress. On the fly leaf, Crowley wrote: "This book is a very valuable book and is very interesting. It is worthy of perusal. The author Michael Shiner was a patriot may he rest in peace."

In 1904, various District of Columbia newspapers reported a protracted court battle for the estate. An article in The Washington Post, June 14, 1905, reports the estate increased substantially by the time of Shiner's death with an estimated value of $40,000 (~$1.08 million in 2024). The few articles that mention Michael Shiner over next three decades, say nothing further about "two quarto volumes in manuscript", but instead relate somewhat sensational information on his daughter Mary Ann Shiner Almarolia's personal life and legal disputes, surrounding her estate.

== Legacy ==
The Diary manuscript is recorded in the collection of the Library of Congress as early as 1906. At the Library of Congress, the diary was microfilmed sometime in the 1930s but remained largely unknown to the general public although periodically scholars quoted a few entries. In 1941 the Library of Congress received a grant from the Rockefeller Foundation for broadcasts of "Hidden History". Noted author, stage star and raconteur Alexander Woollcott read selected entries from the Diary. The presentation was described as "A breathless tale of antebellum days in the District of Columbia, written in bad, but lyrical English by Michael Shiner, a colored slave with a flair for pointed comment on monstrous events" The Diary/manuscript was featured in the March 2002 Library of Congress exhibit, An African-American Odyssey. One section of the exhibit focused on Shiner's successful attempt to purchase his family from slave dealers.

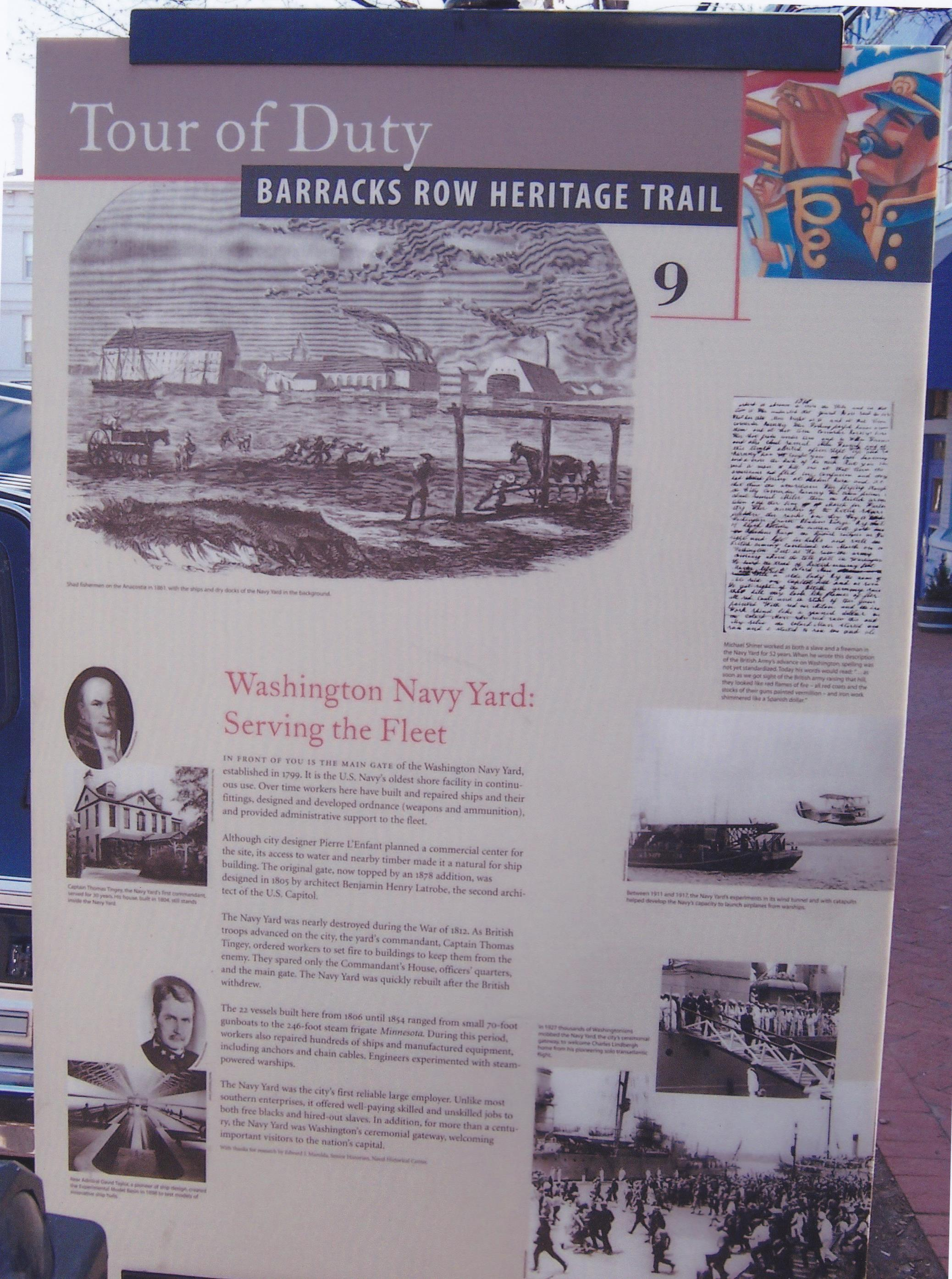
Heritage Trail number 9 showing Michael Shiner Diary, and Washington Navy Yard

In 2004, the District Columbia established the 'Heritage Trail" to commemorate important Washingtonians. On what is called 'Barracks Row" (8th Street S.W.) and only one block from the navy yard, Michael Shiner's life is now commemorated on Heritage Trail marker number 9 with a brief biography and depiction of his now famous 'book", (see thumbnail). The Michael Shiner Residence site is now celebrated by Cultural Tourism DC. In 1867 Shiner purchased Square 946, a 9,000-square foot, triangular property bordered by Ninth, Tenth, and D Streets, SE, and South Carolina Avenue, SE, and built a house there. The address for the Shiner house was 474 Ninth Street, after 1871; it became 338 Ninth Street. By 1891 the property was out of the Shiner family, and Grace Baptist Church was built on the site. That building is now Grace Church condominium, 350 Ninth Street, SE.

In 2005, the Naval District Washington, published John G. Sharp's History of the Washington Navy Yard Civilian Workforce 1799 -1962. This workforce history contained numerous extracts from Shiner's diary and plus a discussion of life and achievements. In 2007, for the first time, "his book", was completely transcribed, edited with an introduction, by John G. Sharp. The Naval History and Heritage Command subsequently published the Diary as The Diary of Michael Shiner Relating to the History of the Washington Navy Yard 1813-1869, with images from each page adjoining the transcribed text; ensuring worldwide availability.

Michael Shiner's life and legacy have been the subject of both increased popular and academic interest. Most recently (2015) for young readers Tonya Bolden's, Capital Days Michael Shiner's Journal and the Growth of our Nation's Capital and scholar Leslie Anderson's Life of Freed Slave Michael Shiner 2014. Kim Roberts 2018 A Literary Guide to Washington DC contains a discussion and appreciation of Shiner both as a Washingtonian and writer. In 2020 for high school students, Naval History and Heritage Command published The Experience of Michael Shiner, an African American at the Washington Navy Yard, 1813–1869: Student Packet Michael Shiner and his heroic legal struggle to free himself and his family; were recently chronicled by historian William G. Thomas III, who found the Shiner Diary, "perhaps the most remarkable on - the - ground perspective there is from an enslaved person in Washington D.C." Salt Marsh Productions, Animating History American Stories Brought to Life, premiered the film, The Diary of Michael Shiner on 29 February 2024, in Omaha Nebraska.
