= 1835 Washington Navy Yard labor strike =

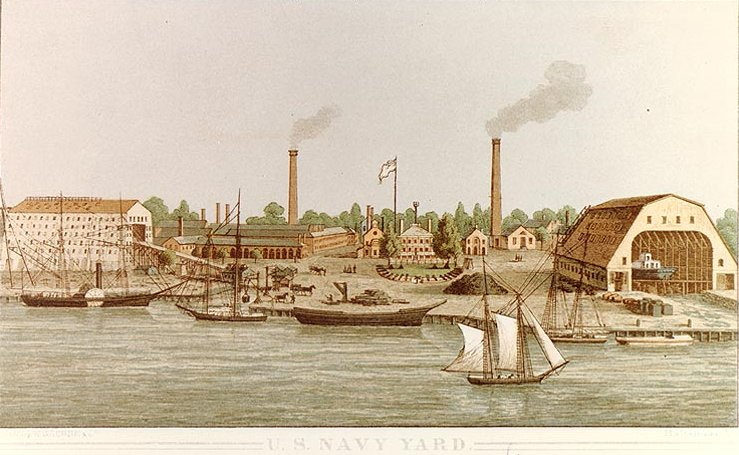
- Washington Navy Yard c. 1862
- Date: July 31 – August 15, 1835
- Duration: 15 days
- Venue: Washington Navy Yard
- Location: 38°52′24″N 76°59′49″W
- Type: Labor strike
- Cause: Order limiting workers' lunch privileges and ten-hour day.
- Organised by: Samuel Briggs, George Lyndall and John Miskill
- Participants: 175 workers
- Outcome: Strike failed in its objectives; workers returned to work.

The Washington Navy Yard labor strike of 1835 is considered the first strike of federal civilian employees. The strike began on Wednesday July 31, 1835, and ended August 15, 1835. The strike supported the movement advocating a ten-hour workday and redressing grievances such as newly imposed lunch-hour regulations. The strike failed in its objectives for two reasons, the Secretary of the Navy refused to change the shipyard working hours and the loss of public support due to the involvement of large numbers of mechanics and laborers in the race riot popularly known as the Snow Riot or Snow Storm.

== Historical background ==
1835 was an important year for American labor. Workers, particularly in Boston, Philadelphia, New York City, and Washington D.C. petitioned for higher wages, better working conditions, and a ten-hour workday. In Washington D.C., from early in the nineteenth century, workers agitated for a reduction in the arduous twelve-hour workday. At the Navy Yard, employment conditions and enslaved labor created problems and strife. For the first thirty years of the nineteenth century, the Navy Yard was the District's principal employer of enslaved African Americans. "Competition for jobs on the navy yard was constant ... white workers feared that competition from enslaved and even free blacks dragged down the wage scale." On the yard, enslaved African Americans worked as seamen, cooks, servants or laborers; they performed most of the unpleasant and onerous jobs. The white workers at the Navy Yard feared and resented the enslaved and hated free blacks as competitors who would drag down the wage scale. At the Navy Yard, most white workers "opposed slavery in their workplace but simultaneously were opposed to black freedom and abolition."

During Commodore Thomas Tingey's tenure from 1801 to 1829, his correspondence with the Board of Navy Commissioners reflects, that after wage demands; racially-based complaints were the most frequent issue needing resolution. The number of blacks, free and enslaved, rose rapidly and by 1808, muster lists reflect that blacks made up one-third of the workforce. The District of Columbia slave population reached its peak of 4,520 in 1820. After that, rapid demographic changes exerted profound social ones, as free blacks increased. The 1830 census for the District reflected that the black population was 9,109. For the first time, this figure included more free blacks, 4,604 (50.5%), than enslaved, 4,505 (49.5%). The number of free blacks continued to increase with each decade; by 1860, the black population totaled 14,316, of which 11,131 were free (77.8). So did the anxiety of white workers who feared ever-increasing economic competition. On the Navy Yard, slaveholders included naval officers and senior civilians who collected the wages of their slaves, rented to the Navy Yard. Labor trouble and racial tension broke out periodically as the restive and volatile workforce sought higher wages and better conditions. Most all naval shipyard workers were per diem or day labor. They were subject to the whims of the annual Congressional appropriation and periodic seasonal reductions in the workforce.

During the early nineteenth century, workers lived in constant anxiety regarding employment and wages. Wages were subject to considerable change, in some cases daily pay fluctuated dramatically, e.g. Washington Navy Yard carpenters' wages were reduced from a high of $2.50 per day in 1808 to $1.64 per day in 1820. Workers actively responded to pay cuts, as early as March 1807; the blacksmiths writing to Secretary of the Navy Robert Smith claimed the "right to Demand an Equal Participation with others in the Benefit of our Labour" and demanded their wages restored. The secretary in reply labeled them "a dissatisfied set of men" and threatened to "dismiss all complaining men as soon as publick convenience will permit" and replace them with a "set of orderly, hard working fellows". Three Washington Navy Yard "job actions" had occurred previously.

On September 29, 1806, Commodore Thomas Tingey reported to Secretary of the Navy Robert Smith his problems with "the Ship Carpenters, Smiths and Riggers". They were upset that their wages had been reduced. The ship "Joiners too, believed that they also were to remain at their former rate of pay. They therefore remonstrated but were informed it could not then be altered - A few days afterward (in the first week of August), they unanimously withdrew from work and deputized 3 or 4 of their numbers, who came to the yard presented a written paper to Captain Cassin, who offered it to me, I refused to receive or peruse it. ... It is undeniable that I consider them a steady and valuable set of workmen ... but I deem it inadmissible to advocate, raising their pay to 1.75 per diem." The second on 13 March 1827, when a dispute over wages provoked laborers to leave the yard briefly to express their displeasure. The third began on 23 March 1830, when the laborers were recorded "standing out" for a week to show that their per diem wage rate should have been granted sooner. These job actions represent a period when federal workers, though not unionized, could strike—an option later denied to government employees with the passage of the 1947 Taft–Hartley Act. Except for the brief entries made by the commanding officer to the secretary of the Navy or the officer of the watch in the station log, little is known about the exact circumstances of these early incidents.

In the United States during the first decades of the nineteenth century, "strikes constituted illegal conspiracies under common law, exposing labor to criminal prosecution". Although rarely enforced, strikes, sometimes led local authorities to call out the militia. Federal employee organizations were in their infancy and mostly limited to charitable endeavors. On the Washington Navy Yard, the first such organization was the Navy Yard Beneficial Society founded in 1804. While not representing workers' economic interests, the society did provide members with a nominal sum of fifty cents per pay period, the assurance of a decent funeral, and financial assistance to their spouse and minor children. Records regarding the Navy Yard Beneficial Society are scarce. However, early employee obituaries prove that it was very active as a charitable group from 1804 to the 1860s. The workday in all federal navy yards prior to 1835 was sunrise to sunset, with time off for breakfast and lunch. In May 1835, the Boston carpenters issued their famous "Ten Hour Circular", advocating a ten-hour day which found wide distribution throughout the major cities on the eastern seaboard and the District of Columbia and quickly became a rallying cry for reducing the length of the working day.

On 26 March 1835, the mechanics in the New York Navy Yard (Brooklyn), petitioned the Board of Navy Commissioners to reduce the workday to ten hours, they stated, "the present custom of laboring on the public works of the Naval Service, from sunrise to sunset, is in summer an inconvenience and hardship to the workman." They requested that the day of labor on the works of the naval service, may not exceed ten hours. Their petition was returned to them with the advice, "that in the Board of Navy Commissioners opinion, ... it would be inconsistent with the public interests, to regulate the working hours in the Navy Yards as proposed in the memorial". In the summer of 1835 Philadelphia Navy Yard, shipwrights, joiners, and other workers became leaders in this effort when they chose to combine direct action, a threatened strike, with political pressure to the executive branch. After first requesting the secretary of the Navy via shipyard Commandant Commodore James Barron, on August 29, 1835, they appealed directly to President Andrew Jackson. Commodore Barron endorsed his workers' request with the following acknowledgment "I would respectfully observe – Seems to be inevitable, sooner or later, for as the working man are seconded by all the Master workmen, city councils etc. there is no probability they will secede from their demands." Their petition was granted, and on August 31, 1835, the president ordered the secretary of the Navy to grant the ten-hour workday effective September 3, 1835. However, the change was only applicable to the Philadelphia Navy Yard. News of these events at Philadelphia Navy Yard was widely circulated in Washington D.C.

== Commodore Isaac Hull ==
Lastly, Commodore Isaac Hull, Washington Navy Yard Commandant from 1829 to 1835, was unpopular with the Navy Yard civilian workforce and frequently had employee difficulties. The Washington Navy Yard workers would have heard of Hull's litany of problems in 1822 while in command of Charlestown Navy Yard, known as Boston Navy Yard. Hull's tenure as commandant at Boston was marred and hindered by a lack of familiarity with the administration of a large shore installation, the management of the civilian workforce, and by the moves to dislodge him by some of his own senior and junior naval officers. Matters got worse when many officers and senior civilians made public accusations questioning Hull's overall command. Because of the serious nature of their charges, a Naval Court of Inquiry met in Charlestown during August 1822 to consider the accusations brought against Hull. On 15 October 1822, the court found Hull had acted properly and within his scope of authority and in his official duties had been "correct and meritorious." Nevertheless, the court cautioned Hull regarding placing his personal property in public stores and employing navy yard mechanics and laborers for private purposes. Nevertheless, the bitterness of the affair never really left Hull, for as he wrote, "This yard is much improved and in fine order for whoever may take it. I am tired of this kind of life and particularly of this place, and have nothing but constant quarrels with the Charleston people."

At Washington Navy Yard, Hull's acrimony toward mechanics and his changes to the established shipyard routine brought similar problems with the labor force. The workers felt he treated them with "silent contempt", which may have resulted from his deafness. Hull, for his part, came to believe that most Navy Yard mechanics were overpaid and underworked. In a revealing 1831 letter, Hull wrote to the president of the Board of Navy Commissioners:

If the men employed by day would perform fair days work, it would be much to the public interest to have the work done in that way, [rather than by contract] but experience has shewn me that all the care and attention possible to give them and all the driving and encouragement is thrown away on the mechanics of this place, for if they are at work by the day on a building that there is the least chance of keeping through the whole season they will be sure to do so though it might be completed by mid-summer.

== Strike ==
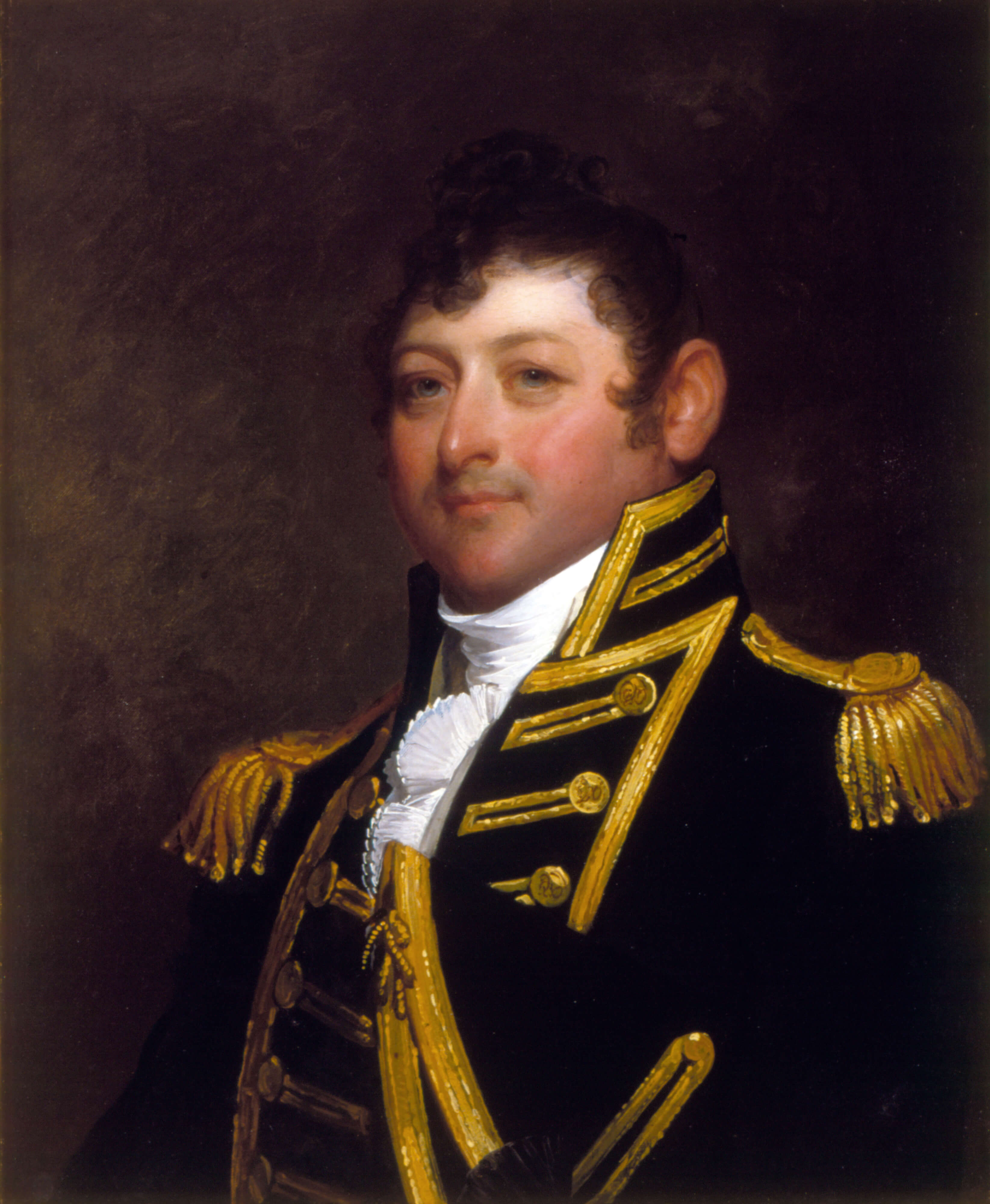
Isaac Hull, who issued the order that caused the strike

The spark that ignited the Washington Navy Yard strike occurred on July 29, 1835, when Commodore Isaac Hull issued a new and unprecedented regulation forbidding yard workers and mechanics from entering shop spaces during their lunch break and from bringing lunches on the yard property. The order read:

The Commandant of the Navy Yard at Washington D.C. finds it necessary to adopt the following regulations Vizt The Mechanics (with the exception of the Anchorsmiths & Engineers) and Laborers employed in the Navy Yard are prohibited entering the Workshops, Ship Houses and other places where the public property, Tools &c are deposited, during the hours allotted to Meals. The Mechanics and Laborers are forbidden to bring their Meals into the Yard either in Baskets, Bags or otherwise, and none will be permitted to eat their Meals within the Yard unless specially permitted by the Commandant.

Hull's regulation was issued in response to complaints from the master mechanics about the loss of tools and other small items. A watch was set up, and not long afterward, on 27 July 1835, Anthony Sumners, a blacksmith striker in the anchor shop, was found hiding a copper spike in his lunch basket. Afterward, a search of Sumners' house revealed more missing government property. Sumners later explained that he stole the items to sell and support his large family. Sumners was subsequently arrested, tried, and convicted of theft of government property. Sumners was later pardoned by President Andrew Jackson based on his service in the War of 1812 and the recommendation of the jury. When the workers found they no longer could carry even their own lunch into the yard, many viewed the order as nothing more than a presumption that they were all thieves. On Friday, 31 July 1835, when Francis Barry, the clerk of the roll, began reading the morning muster roll, a few men filed in to answer while their workmates stood nearby just outside the main Latrobe Gate yelling and urging them, "Don't answer! Don't answer!" Naval constructor William Doughty, a frequent critic of the commandant, denounced Hull's regulations telling the men Hull must "think them all rogues or thieves." Three-quarters of workers employed in August 1835, 175 of 231, left the yard and joined their colleagues on strike. According to Hull's figures, of the 175 workers who went on strike, 107 were still out on August 14, 1835. The most substantial group of holdouts remained the ship carpenters and their young apprentices, urged on by the inimitable William Doughty and his steadfast antipathy toward Hull.

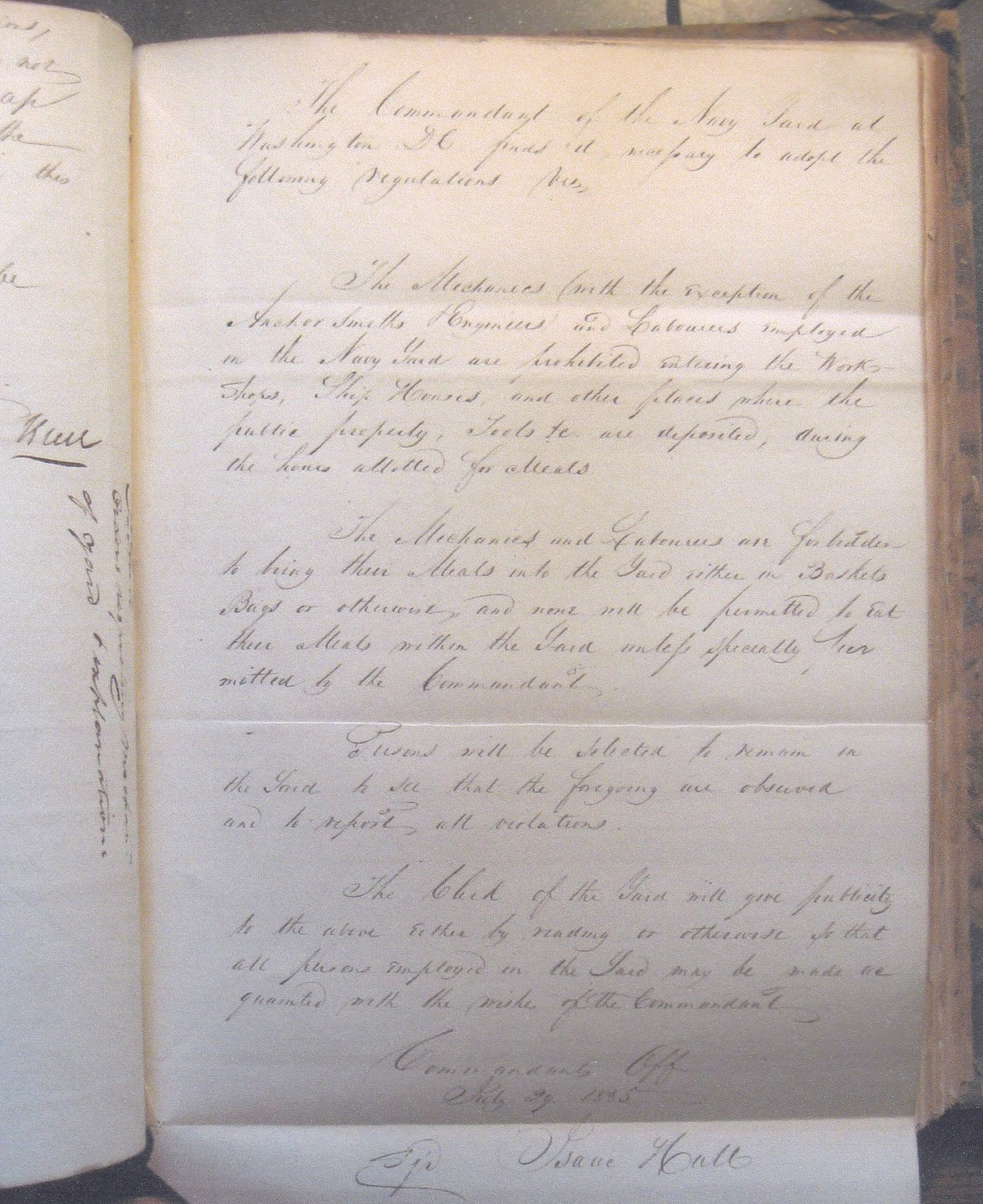
Commodore Isaac Hull's regulation of July 29, 1835, re employee meals and access to the Washington Navy Yard that touched off the August 1835 labor strike. This was the first labor strike of federal employees

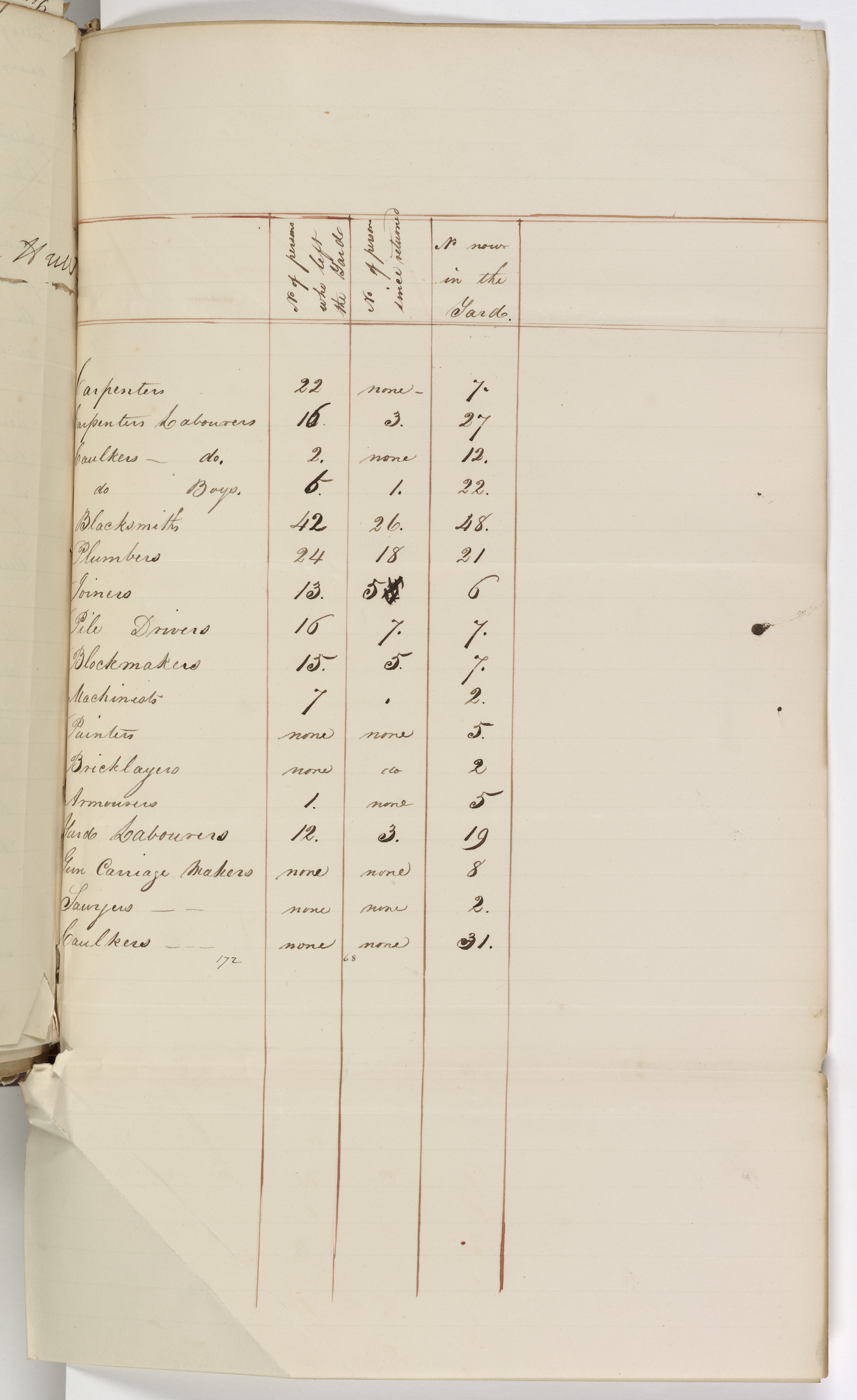
Enclosure to letter from Issac Hull to Mahlon Dickerson dated August 12, 1835, NARA RG 45 Office of Naval Records and Library. Enclosure enumerates striking WNY civilian employees by occupation.

Later on Friday afternoon, the strikers quickly formed a committee. They elected their leaders: Samuel Briggs (plumber), George Lyndall (ship joiner), and John Miskill (carpenter). Local papers reported that "great excitement prevails among the Mechanics in the Yard." The three elected leaders, followed by 150 of their fellow strikers, immediately carried their petition directly to the office of Secretary of the Navy Mahlon Dickerson, located just a mile and half away on Capitol Hill, "to pray for redress of grievances." Hull's predecessor Thomas Tingey had "understood the difficult conditions in which ordinary workmen, who were on daily wages, had to earn a living." Hull, who had spent much of his life at sea, could not comprehend or convey this to his workforce. His previous command at Charleston was racked by controversy with mechanics, which soured him. The mechanics and laborers quickly came to resent his gruff manner of address which they thought more suited for the quarterdeck. In their petition to the secretary, they vented their animosity toward Commodore Hull's whole demeanor "The very first step of his administration was marked by his despotic power, by parading us all before him to try the tempers of the men by swearing in most blasphemous manner that if they did not march before him, he would march them out the dam-d yard."

Dickerson, alarmed, quickly wrote Hull to question what had prompted workers to strike. On 1 August 1835, Hull replied with a copy of his original order and an explanation of what in his judgment incited the workers' action: "The regulation has met with disapprobation of the workmen generally and without stating their objections and without assigning their reasons for doing so have left the yard and ended their work. I cannot conceive of any good reason and I believe that the mechanics of this said yard have been acted upon by other causes." Hull's "acted upon by other causes" is underscored in the original and is his reference to the Board of Navy Commissioners' resistance to the ten-hour day. Hull was aware that his Navy Yard workers were striking over more than the newly imposed lunch restrictions. Hull, like other shipyard commandants, was mindful of the ten-hour day movement and the Board of Navy Commissioner's resistance to reducing the workweek. Hull also knew of the calls for a general strike that summer by the Philadelphia shipyard workers and probably thought they were the proximate cause of the strike. He must have feared these calls had found an attentive audience.

The strike and the subsequent Snow Riot in the District exacerbated long-standing white fears of black workers on the Navy Yard. In an undated diary entry for August 1835, African American diarist Michael Shiner confirmed intimidation by white workers and their demand that the black caulkers stop work: "Commodore Hull ishsared and every one of them struck and said they wouldn't work anny moore and at the same time they were collered man from Baltimore by the name of Israel Jones a caulker by Trade he was the forman Caulker of those Colerded Caulkers and they were fifteen or twenty of them here at that time Caulkin on the Columbia and the Carpenters made all of them knock oft two." Isaac Hull's report to the secretary of the Navy confirm Michael Shiner's account that the black caulkers did not strike. As Michael Shiner wrote, the white workers blamed Hull for bringing in black caulkers from Baltimore and believed that black workers were to be used to break their strike. Hull's report to Dickerson shows the black caulkers did not strike. This and other incidents raised always simmering racial tension in the city and yard. White mechanics and laborers went on a three-day rampage in which they threatened blacks and broke up their businesses and property. On August 14, 1835, Hull wrote a letter to Dickerson and expressed some apprehension for the safety of the black caulkers that he recently hired. Rather than make a decision, Hull looked to the secretary to solve his dilemma. "Information has been conveyed to me that the Excitement which has prevailed in the City for some days past is about to be extended to the Neighborhood of the Establishment; the immediate Cause I understand is there are employed in the Yard a number of Blacks, who were in consequence of the Scarcity of Caulkers in this City brought in from Baltimore to caulk the Ship now building. Under the Circumstances I have to request that you will be pleased to give me instructions, Shall I let the Blacks inside the yard and afford them such protection as the force and means at my Command will allow or shall I discharge them and afford them an opportunity to return to Baltimore?" As one historian has noted, Dickerson chose to throw the black caulkers to the mob as he promptly replied, "In answer to your letter of this date, I have to observe that for the present should think it not best to admit the colored people in the Navy Yard at night." After days of disorder and riot, President Andrew Jackson ordered a company of US Marines to restore order.

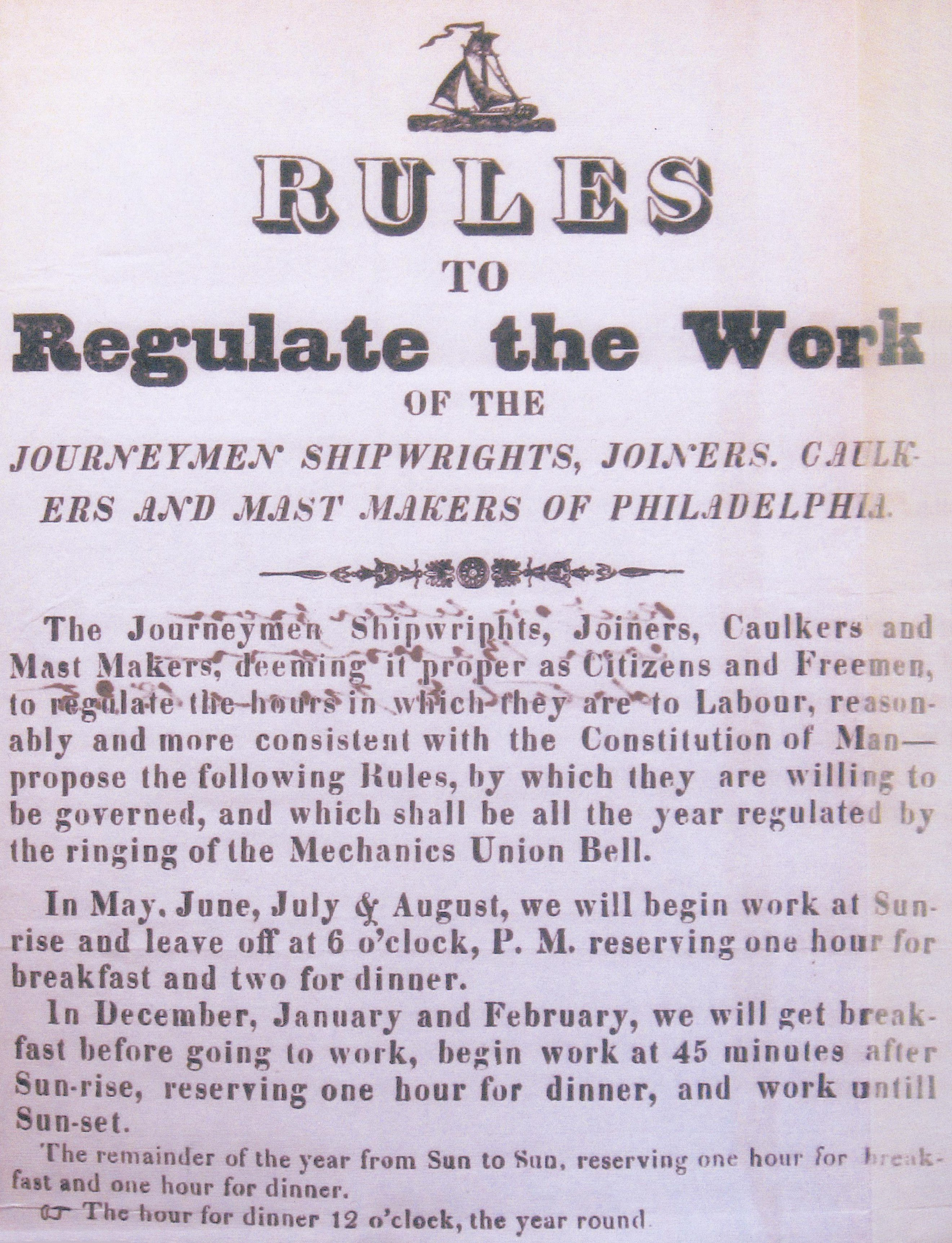
Image of the 1835 "Ten Hour Day Circular" by the Philadelphia shipwrights, joiners, caulkers, and mast makers to advocate for a reduction in working hours from 12 to 10. This circular was sent to the secretary of the Navy by Commodore James Barron. In 1835, labor leaders widely distributed the circular to Washington Navy Yard and other federal shipyards. Source: National Archives and Records Administration, Washington D.C., Board of Navy Commissioners, Letters Receive, RG 45, E314 Volume 91.

The strike, which began over regulations and work hours, had "quickly morphed into a race riot" as now angry unemployed white mechanics and laborers took out their resentment on the black population. Many of the Navy Yard "mechanics were primed for racial conflict." The strikers were particularly incensed that Hull had brought a group of free black caulkers from Baltimore to caulk the frigate USS Columbia. This action inflamed an already volatile situation and was an important reason why the mechanics threatened to attack the Navy Yard and Commodore Hull. At about the same time, a rumor rapidly circulated that a free black man named Beverly Snow, the owner of Epicurean Eating House, known for serving sophisticated and luxurious food, had insulted the wives of the Navy Yard mechanics. This resulted in a group of mechanics attacking Snow's restaurant. Michael Shiner relates that the Navy Yard strikers were angry at Snow and prepared to go after Isaac Hull. "Mechanics of classes gathered into snows Restaurant and broke him up Root and Branch and they were after snow but he flew for his life and that night after they had broke snow up they threatened to come to the navy yard after Commodore Hull. But they didn't come that night and the next day Commodore Hull Received orders from the navy department from the Hon secretary of the navy Mr levy Woodbury [Levi Woodbury] to fortify the yard". After breaking up his restaurant, the mechanics drank all Snow's stock of whiskey and champagne. Fortunately for Snow, the white rioters could not locate him; he had escaped by hiding in a sewer. In the capital, mobs of whites continued to attack all establishments run by free blacks: schools, churches, and businesses.

Josephine Seaton, a keen observer and the daughter of the publisher of the National Intelligencer, William Seaton, states the Navy Yard strikers played a significant role in the Snow riot: "Snow will certainly be torn to pieces by the mechanics if he be caught, and they are in full pursuit of him. Unfortunately, several hundred mechanics of the navy yard are out of employment, who, aided and abetted by their sympathizers, create the mob, — the first I have ever seen, not recollecting those of Sheffield, and it is truly alarming." Seaton was one of the few whites to record the strike, a strike which revealed the corrosive effects of racism on the Navy Yard workforce as white workers sought to blame their precarious economic situation on free and enslaved African Americans. The riot was widely publicized in national and local newspapers and alarmed the white community. "The drunken rioters acted with impunity so long as they limited their attacks to Black people. When they began to menace the homes of wealthy whites... the city government called out the militia" As their economic situation deteriorated and stung by public criticism of their actions, the Navy Yard mechanics and laborers sought to end the strike. The two sides came together in an agreement that both Hull and the workers accepted through the offices of an outside mediator, Dr. Alexander A. McWilliams, who had a medical practice adjacent to the Navy Yard and was known to both the workforce and Hull. As a result, the Department of the Navy encouraged mediation, and the Navy Yard labor strike ended on Saturday, 15 August 1835, when the mechanics returned to work.

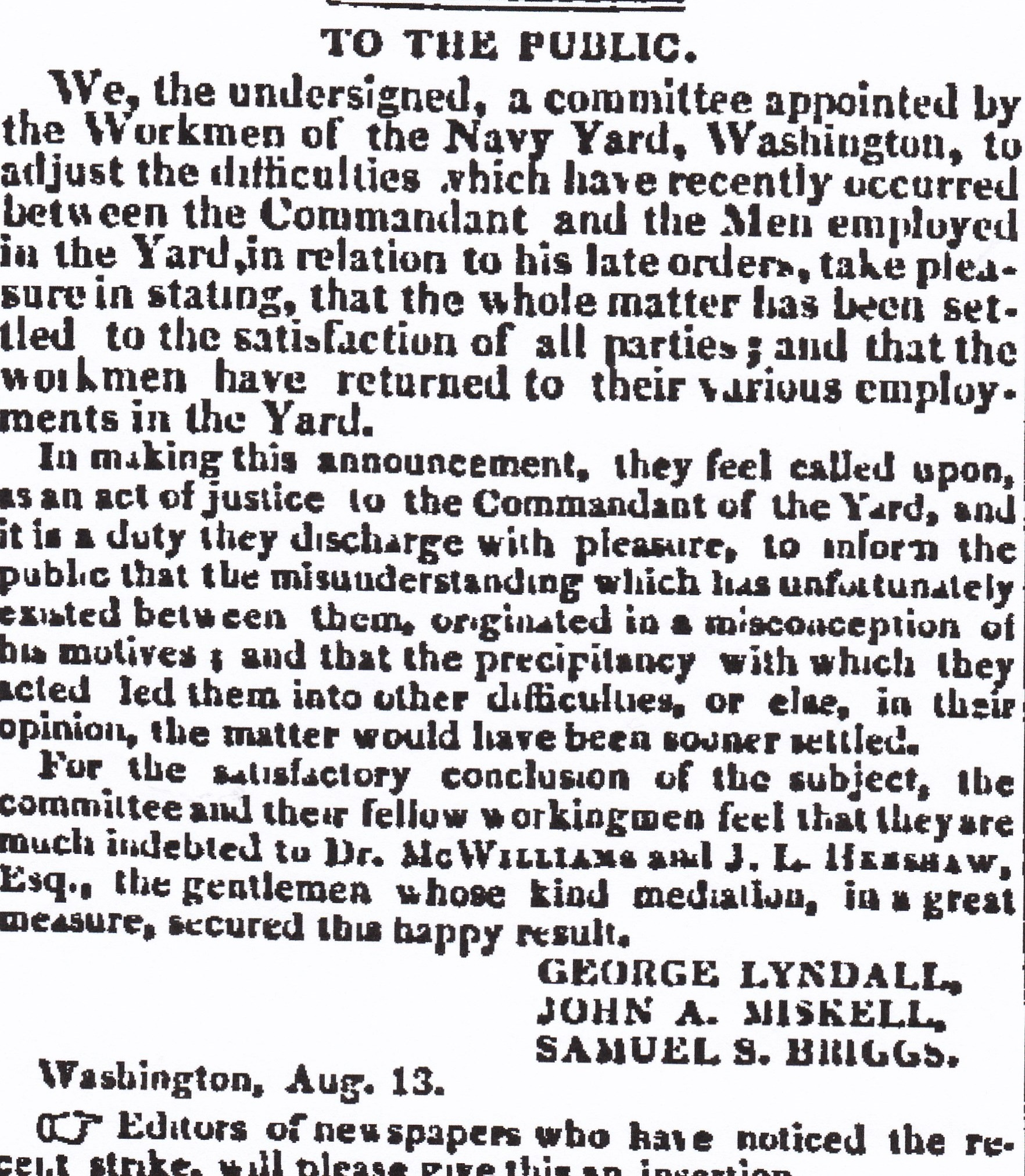
Notice to the public from the Washington Navy Yard strike leaders regarding the end of the strike. The strike leaders published this notice in the Daily National Intelligencer on 14 August 1835 to inform the public that the strike had ended through mediation. Note the last line for early use of the word strike for a labor dispute.

Later, " Hull allowed the men to comeback to their jobs without penalties. Most of the white mechanics returned to work at the Navy Yard. President Andrew Jackson met with the rioters and vowed to protect their happiness" by cracking down on free Blacks who violated restrictions on their lives." The City subsequently refused all compensation to the Black riot victims. It passed a restrictive ordinance barring them from being out at night.

== Legacy ==
On August 15, 1835, the Navy Yard strikers were allowed to return to work. The strike had ended through mediation with both Commodore Hull and the strikers acknowledging the two-week labor strike as simply a "misunderstanding" which "originated in a misconception." While publicly accepting mediation, neither party was happy with the result. The Commodore only reluctantly accepted the secretary of the Navy's recommendation to allow the strikers to return. The strikers, too, were not happy, for they had failed to achieve any of their goals. To calm worker agitation for the ten-hour day, the Board of Navy Commissioners, on August 26, 1835, issued a directive to naval shipyards establishing "the mean of the working hours for the year" for Washington D.C.: 9.53 hours. This BNC order set work hours to coincide with the available daylight hours during the year, dramatically skewing the workday; for example, from December 1 to 15, 1836, the day was 9.18 hours. However, from July 1 to 15, 1836, the workday was 14.42 hours! This was not the ten-hour day the workers sought, and this nominal change in calculating the basis of work hours failed to mollify workers and remained deeply unpopular.

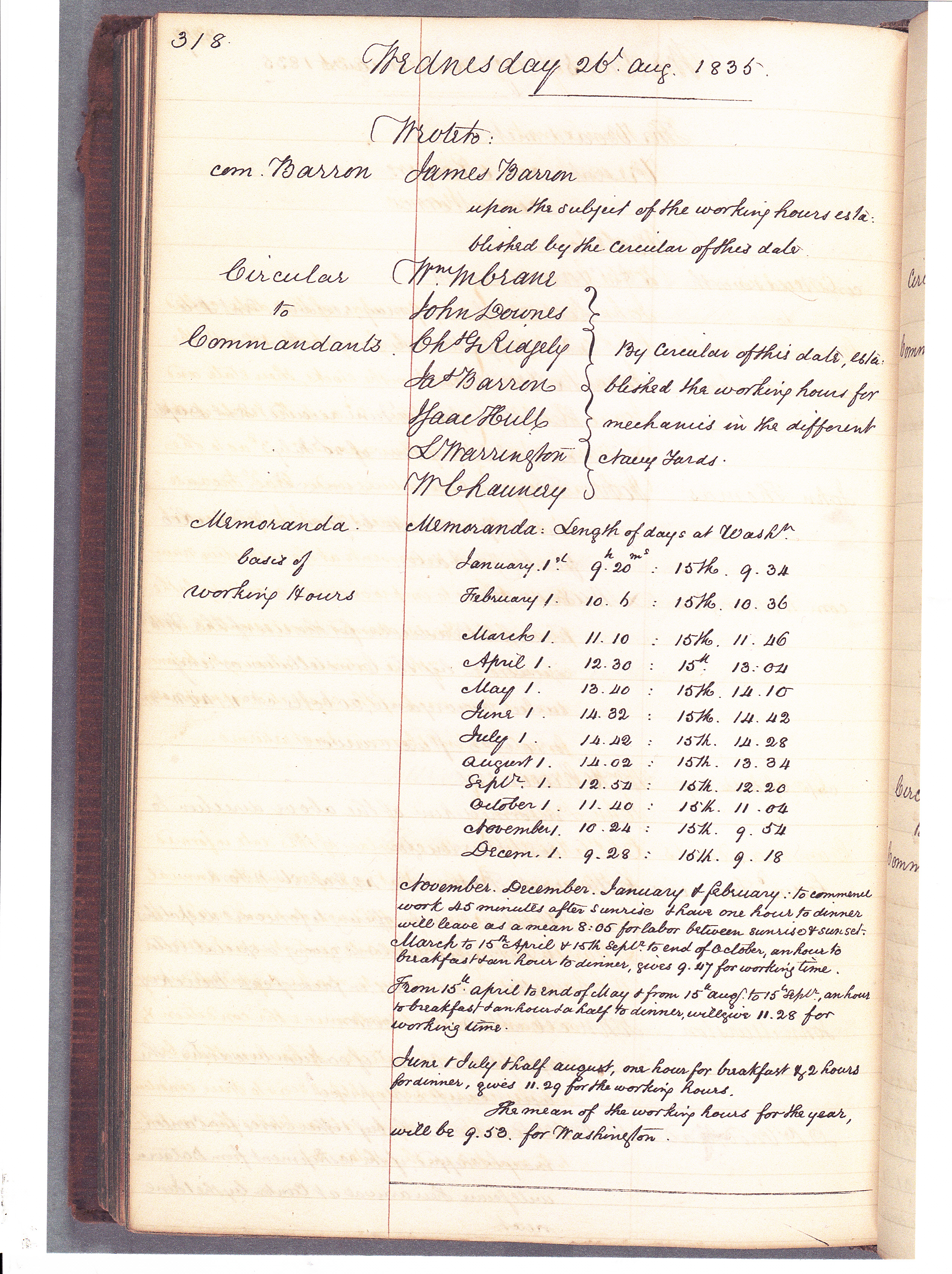
Board of Navy Commissioners circular to all naval shipyards dated August 26, 1835. The BNC directed change to the "basis of working hours" to coincide with hours of available daylight, with a goal of 9.53 mean hours for the year at Washington Navy Yard. This edict failed to appease worker demand for a ten-hour day. Instead, the new instruction dramatically skewed the existing workday by requiring workers to labor 9.18 hours in December but up to 14.42 hours in July.

Commodore Isaac Hull left the Navy Yard in September 1835, never to return. However, the regulation regarding the workers' lunch restrictions remained in place, and the work hours continued the same until 1840. For Navy Yard workers, the strike of 1835 revealed the weakness and tenuous nature of their bargaining situation. As day labor in a protracted dispute, absent effective organization and financial resources, they inevitably suffered. Most of all, the strike revealed the corrosive effects of racism on the workforce as white workers sought to blame their precarious economic situation on free and enslaved African Americans. Further, the strike left as part of its legacy a deep and abiding racial mistrust, which would linger. For the next century, the history of the Washington Navy Yard strike of 1835 and Snow race riot remained an embarrassment to be glossed over and disassociated from the District of Columbia and Washington Navy Yard's official histories. Historical understanding of the strike has improved with the transcription and publication of important documents such as the correspondence of Isaac Hull and the Diary of Michael Shiner. Prior to the 2007 publication of the complete Michael Shiner diary, one historian, for example, actually described the strike as an example of early inter-racial worker solidarity. "In a number of instances, however, Negro and white workers [at the WNY] worked and went on strike together. Thus white carpenters and caulkers and Negro caulkers employed in the navy yard in Washington joined in a strike in July 1835." Alternately, another historian has argued that the 1835 participants in the riot "were mostly mechanics" and "mostly Irish". More recent scholarship on Michael Shiner and Isaac Hull has focused on the participation of the 1835 Navy Yard strikers in the riot as noted in the letters of Josephine Seaton and correspondence of Isaac Hull.

Following the strike's collapse, the ten-hour workday would elude federal shipyard workers for another five years. President Martin Van Buren, on 31 March 1840, finally mandated a ten-hour workday for all mechanics and laborers employed on public works. Michael Shiner fully understood the significance and spoke for thousands when he declared this event "ought to be recorded in every working man's heart." At the Washington Navy Yard, the implementation order stated, "By Direction of the President of the United States all public establishments will hereafter be regulated as to working hours by the 'ten hour System'."

== See also ==
- 1835 Paterson textile strike
- 1835 Philadelphia general strike
