= George Teamoh =

American politician

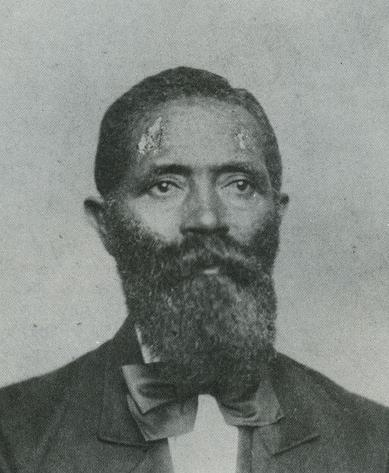

Member of the Virginia Senate from the Norfolk County and Portsmouth district
- In office October 5, 1869 – December 5, 1871
- Preceded by: George W. Grice
- Succeeded by: Matthew P. Rue

Personal details
- Born: 1818 Norfolk, Virginia, U.S.
- Died: after 1887
- Party: Republican
- Occupation: Caulker; carpenter; laborer; Virginia State Senator

George Teamoh (c. 1818 – after 1887) was an American author, politician, and community leader who rose to prominence in Virginia during the Reconstruction era. Born into slavery in Norfolk, Virginia, he worked at the Fort Monroe, the Norfolk Naval Yard and other military installations before the American Civil War, then escaped to freedom in New York and moved to Massachusetts circa 1853. After the war he returned to Virginia, working first as a caulker in a shipyard and becoming a leader in Portsmouth's Black community, then going on to serve in the Constitutional Convention of 1868 and Virginia's state senate, and finally writing an autobiography in his final years.

Teamoh's autobiography is remarkable for his clear rebuke of the military's use of slave labor and the federal government's role both in perpetuating slavery and failing to protect newly emancipated blacks.

I have worked in every Department in the Navy Yard and Dry-Dock, as a laborer, and this during very long years of unrequited toil, and the same might be said of the vast numbers, reaching to thousands of slaves who have been worked, lashed and bruised by the United States government ...

His narrative also contains important information on Reconstruction era Virginia, as he had first hand knowledge of the Constitutional Convention and the senate, discussing with candour the role played by African American delegates in the state convention, his efforts as a state senator to promote equitable work policies at the Norfolk Naval Shipyard, and the factionalism within the Republican party that led to his defeat.

== Early life ==
George Teamoh was born enslaved in 1818 in Norfolk, Virginia. His legal owners at birth were Josiah and Jane Thomas, and when he was about ten years of age he was moved with the Thomases to Portsmouth, Virginia. He fondly recalled Jane Thomas, his owner, saying she "harbored" and "gave comfort to a fugitive for the space of fifteen months" and assisted free Black people; she was known as "good old Miss Jane".

His autobiography contains only limited information regarding his parents, though he states his mother "bore the common name "Winnie"... [and] died when [he] was quite small." In another passage, he states that he was orphaned prior to adolescence. In the 1863 record of his second marriage, Teamoh gave the names of his parents as David James Teamoh and Lavinia Henrietta Evans. He had two younger half brothers: Thomas Teamoh, born circa 1835 and John William Teamoh, born circa 1832.

In 1832, while working in a brickyard, Teamoh taught himself to read and write by listening to white children. He would sing the alphabet and identify words on handbills and posters. In later years, he found a copy of John T. Walker's A Critical Pronouncing Dictionary and Expositor of the English Language, which helped him gain an extensive vocabulary. He was an admirer of William Shakespeare's plays, quoted dramatist Ben Jonson and Lord Byron and enjoyed going to the theater. He also came to love the writing of the Church of England and learned much of The Book of Common Prayer.

Later in life, Teamoh may have read "The Ship's career and other poems", an 1860 volume by mid-Victorian evangelist, abolitionist and poet George Joseph Williamson. This is supported by the fact that a line from Williamson's poem Missionary Enterprise, "God made man, man made the slave", appears also in Teamoh's own poetic effort, which he included in his manuscript. Both Teamoh and Williamson were former sailors, devout Methodists and temperance advocates, who sought to avoid conflict, build alliances and improve the lot of others.

In the late 1830s, Teamoh began to keep a journal to record "what transpired in this City and the Vicinity. In 1839 that whole year, I carried to record every hour of sun-shine, rain, cloud and thunder storm, marriages, births and deaths; distinguished visitors; ministers of the Gospel and where they hailed from; ... In indeed I put every thing that ear could hear an eye could see or hand might reach, under contribution to serve my ends." Unfortunately, these early journals have not survived. Teamoh was justly proud of his hard-won literacy and on the front cover of six of eighteenth school exercise books that he penned his autobiographical manuscript, he carefully wrote: "written by himself." His literacy quickly marked him out as other blacks, requested he write or read for them, but he quickly found his literacy made many whites uneasy or suspicious. Literacy among African Americans was a prized and treasured possession. Thomas Smallwood, a former slave who worked at the Washington Navy Yard in the 1840s, remembered how amazed whites were to learn that he could read: "What little I know of the letter was obtained in the following manner, for I never had a days schooling. The gentleman before mentioned, as my master, and his wife, learned me the English alphabet, and to spell in two syllables. When that became known to his neighbors they were amazed at the fact that a black or coloured person could learn the Alphabet, yea, learn to spell in two syllables. I appeared to be a walking curiosity in the village where I then lived, and when passing about the village I would be called into houses, and the neighbors collected around to hear me say the Alphabet and to spell baker and cider, to their great surprise ..."

Slaveholder Jane Thomas hired out George Teamoh in the 1830s to the 1840's as laborer, caulker and ship-carpenter at the Norfolk Navy Yard, Fort Monroe and to private businesses in the greater Norfolk area. By the 1830s, Norfolk Navy Yard (then known as Gosport Navy Yard) and other naval shipyards began to experience difficulties securing qualified ship caulkers. In the letter below, Captain Louis Warrington writing to the Board of Navy Commissioners, acknowledged qualified ship caulkers were essential and in short supply at Norfolk and requested to hire caulker apprentices. While not stated in Captain Warrington's message, ship caulking had become a trade predominately associated with African Americans. By the 1840s the shipyard had fifteen black caulkers and five white caulkers. "By the time I was of age – 21 – and had learned a branch of mechanics known as ( caulking- ship work) ... when I took a "job" of caulking at the same place on one of the government flats." Caulking was hard and dirty work, consequently often one by enslaved or free blacks. Typically caulkers worked done with a special hammer or wedge, then hot pitch was poured on the oakum and a hot caulking iron applied tar to seal the seam. Some slaveholders (including Jane Thomas), allowed their bondsmen to seek work on their own and to negotiate with potential employers. Frederick Douglass, who as a slave worked as a caulker in a Baltimore Maryland shipyard, described how the system worked:

I was to be allowed all my time; to make all bargains for work; to find my own employment, and to collect my own wages, and, in return for this liberty, I was required, or obliged, to pay ... three dollars at the end of each week, and to board and clothe myself, and buy my own calking tools. A failure in any of these particulars would put an end to my privilege. This was a hard bargain. The wear and tear of clothing, the losing and breaking of tools, and the expense of board, made it necessary for me to earn at least six dollars per week to keep even with the world. All who are acquainted with caulking know how uncertain and irregular that employment is. It can be done to advantage only in dry weather, for it is useless to put wet oakum into a seam. Rain or shine, however work or no work, at the end of each week the money must be forthcoming.

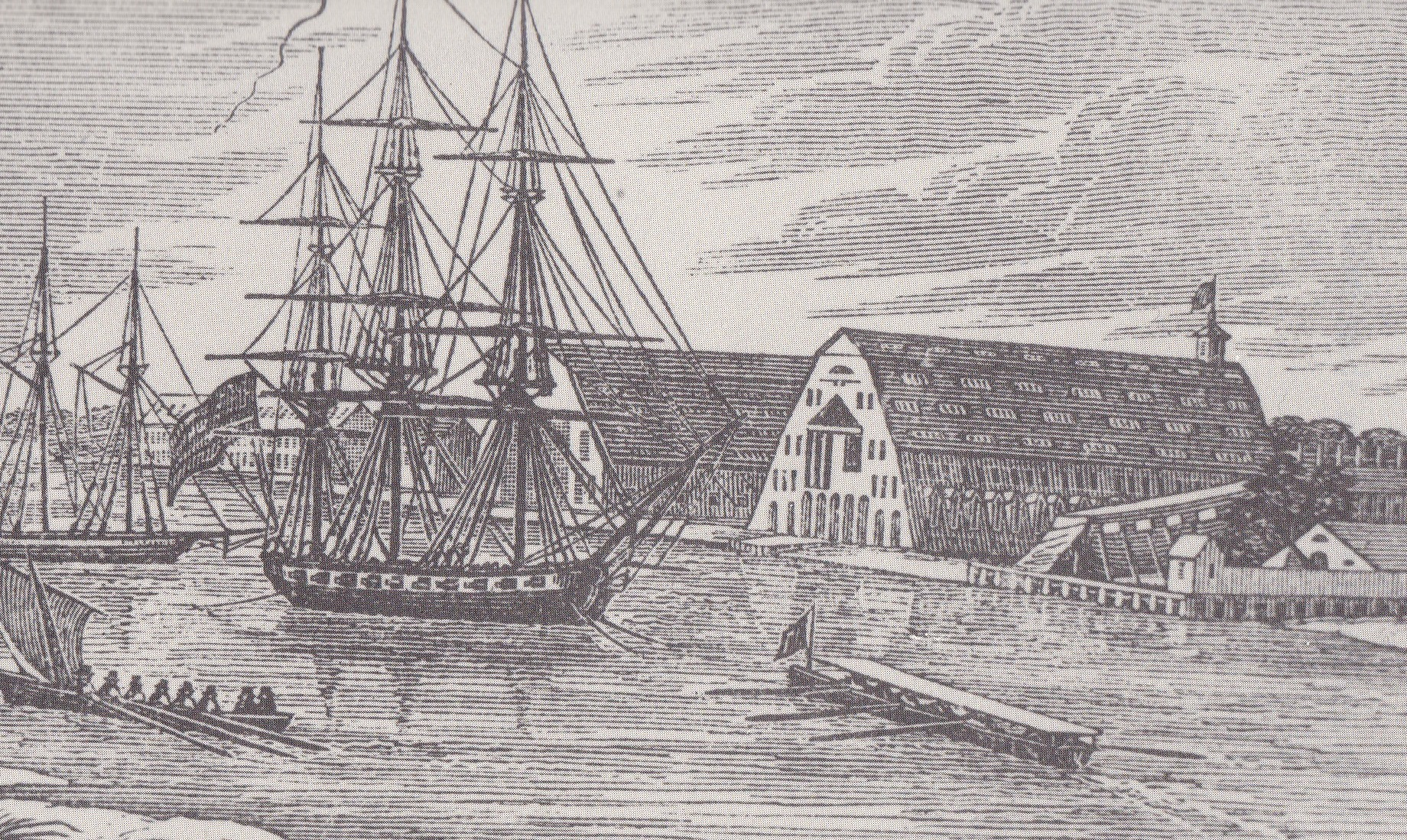
Gosport Navy Yard Portsmouth circa 1840 about the time George Teamoh first worked at the shipyard. Note vessels and ship houses. Image from Historical Recollections of Va, Henry Howe 1852, p. 401 LOC

When Teamoh first came into the shipyard, white shipyard workers were resentful of enslaved labor and fearful that free blacks might inspire the enslaved to revolt. Commodore Lewis Warrington in an 1831 letter to the Board of Navy Commissioners felt it necessary to respond to three petitions of Dry Dock workers and local residents, regarding their fears of enslaved labor. A large group of white stone masons had quit their positions and accused project chief engineer, Loammi Baldwin Jr. of the unfair hiring of enslaved labor in their stead. In their 6 January 1830 petition they wrote:"' On application severally by us for employment we were refused, in consequence of the subordinate officers hiring negroes by the year under the immediate cognizance of the chief Engineer, and placing them at stone cutting for which they are incompetent to the injury of we the undersigned who are men of families – and placed in the peculiar circumstance in which we stand, we view it as a most grievous imposition, detrimental to the laboring interests of the community and subversive to every principal of equality. We respectfully ask your interposition."

Warrington replied "White laborers cannot, be readily I apprehend obtained, and when obtained, will not certainly be procured "'on terms as advantageous to the public, as those now given to blacks" – The price of white laborers is from 75/ 100 to 87/100 and that of the blacks 62 ½ /100 - white laborers do not perform more labor then the blacks per day - So far from it, that in my opinion the latter, in this climate, perform the most - of course as there is no except of work on the part of the former, to compensate except of wages –The blacks are not difficult to govern in the Yard, and I have heard of no "'insurrectionary" "'disorderly or refractory" spirits exhibited by them - There are about two hundred and forty six blacks employed in the Yard and Dock altogether; of whom one hundred and thirty six are in the former and one hundred ten in the latter – We shall in the Course of this day or tomorrow discharge twenty which will leave but one hundred and twenty six on our roll – The evil of employing blacks, if it be one, is in a fair and rapid course of diminution, as our whole number, after the timber, now in the water is stowed, will not exceed sixty; and those employed at the Dock will be discharged from time to time, as their services can be dispensed with – when it is finished, there will be no, occasion for the employment of any –'

Teamoh recalled "Slavery was so interwoven at that time in the very ligaments of the that to assail it from any quarter was not only a herculean task, but on requiring great consideration caution and comprehensiveness." He goes onto say "At that I was occasionally at work in the Navy Yard, and with hundreds of others in my condition felt to remain there rather than being worse situated or sold.

Despite the hardships, Teamoth learned his trade at Norfolk Navy Yard with master ship caulker, and slaveholder, Peter Teabeault aka Peter Teabo. Teamoth was paid about a dollar and sixty-two cents a day; he noted white caulkers typically received two dollars a day. Still Teamoth was able to save some money and continued to work at the Norfolk for many years.

In 1839 the Navy Department attempted to stop the practice of white shipyard mechanics leasing their enslaved laborers to the shipyards. The response from the shipyard came quickly on 21 June 1839 Commodore Lewis Warrington wrote to Secretary of the Navy James Kirke Paulding a letter to request this action be deferred. He enclosed memorial (petition) from the navy yard master mechanics and workmen. One of the signatories was master ship caulker Peter Teabo. If Warrington believed, this would end the practice, he was wrong, for enslaved labor continued to be employed at Norfolk Navy Yard, hence the atmosphere was often tense.

In 1809 the United States Congress passed a law requiring bidding for contractual services, so that the Government publicly announced what it wished to buy and allowed everyone an opportunity to bid on the work. Although not specifically directed against the hire of slaves on naval shipyards and army installations, it was often interpreted as such. Consequently verbal contracts, "Gentleman's Agreements" and other subterfuges surmounted this barrier. One of the most egregious methods was to place enslaved workers as "Ordinary Seamen' on the shipyard employment rolls of "the ordinary". The ordinary was where naval ships being refitted or taken out service were held in reserve. African Americans Charles Ball and Michael Shiner were among many enslaved navy yard workers enumerated on the military muster as "Ordinary Seamen".

This subterfuge Teamoh noted was widespread at Norfolk Navy Yard, " I was again hired by the U.S. Government to work in its ordinary service. - was there some two years [1843-1844] on board Ship USS Constitution lying in ordinary off Norfolk Navy Yard ..." Teamoh was even issued a discharge dated 10 September 1845, certifying that George Teamoh Ordinary Seaman was "regularly discharged from the United States Ship Constitution in Ordinary at Navy Yard Norfolk, and from the sea service of the United States." That same year Commodore Jesse Wilkerson Commandant of the Gosport Navy Yard confirmed to Secretary of the Navy George Bancroft "It is my duty, however to appraise the Department, that a majority of them are negro slaves, and that a large portion of those employed in the Ordinary for many years, have been of that description, but by what authority I am unable to say as nothing can be found in the records of my office on the subject – These men have been examined by the Surgeon of the Yard and regularly Shipped for twelve months." Teamoh was not fooled, "that branch of the U.S service, so far as hirelings were concerned, was but little different from letting out to a building contractor, varying only in point of punishment - whipping post and cow hid - gang-way and cat-o.nine tails."

== Marriage and family ==
In 1841 Methodist minister, and chaplain to the Norfolk Navy Yard, the Reverend Vernon Eskridge married Teanoh to an enslaved woman named Sallie. The couple had at least one son (John) and two daughters (Jane, also identified as Lavinia, and Josephine). In 1853 Sallie and the children who were the property of slaveholder Olice Amidon were sold, despite Teamoh's pleading, to a slave dealer in Richmond, Virginia where she was eventually purchased by a Richmond resident "Henry Smith a low liquor dealer." Teamoh noted Smith's "morally depraved appetite" and makes clear Smith abused both wife and daughter. On 6 May 1863 Teamoh married Elizabeth Smith in Boston, Massachusetts. Teamoh characterized it as "An unhappy marriage of twenty-four months ..."

Robert T. Teamoh, the son of George's brother Thomas Teamoh, was a state senator in the 1894 Massachusetts legislature.

== Escape and life as free man ==
In 1853 according to Teamoh, Jane Thomas had promised his mother to manumit him at some future time. Virginia's laws made such manumissions difficult and expensive. Jane Thomas signed Teamoh as a carpenter on the merchant ship Currituck bound for Bremen, Germany. On the return voyage he decided to jump ship in New York City "where he hired a lawyer to secure his back-pay, declared himself formally free and then came to New Bedford, Massachusetts about 1 December 1853." As a fugitive and freeman Teamoh received some help initially from Underground Railroad agents Lucinda Clark Bush and Deacon William Bush, local innkeepers.

Despite the help and good will, Teamoh quickly learned " notwithstanding their repeated manifestations of kindness. I was doomed to share a hard lot in that wealthy city of New Bedford ... while seeking employ, I was often shifted from side to side of ware houses groaning under the weight of life's luxuries in order to catch some warmth from the sun." Teamoh found that seeking shelter in New Bedford, meant living in a city with large numbers of fugitives, all looking for work. For a brief period he found work as a caulker, but in a hard New England winter, he was laid off and the increased competition for laboring jobs, reduced him to snow shoveling, with no winter clothes, loading and unloading coal, consequently he moved to Boston Massachusetts, where he was able to find work with his half brothers John William and Thomas.

== Black Republican leader and state senator ==
After Union forces occupied Portsmouth in 1862, Teamoh returned to work as a caulker in the shipyard. He quickly rose to prominence as a leader of Portsmouth's African American community and advocated for fair wages for fellow shipyard workers. He was also able to locate his wife Sallie and daughter Josephine, whom he found living in a horse stable—both traumatized by years of abuse. His wife Sallie was "bed ridden, emaciated, pale and almost speechless. The child I had left with her [Josephine] had now grown to the age of young women, and made a mother per force of slavery by her licentious master and the master of all diabolism, Henry Smith a Richmond rum seller."

After securing his wife and daughter, Teamoh quickly jumped into state politics. He became a delegate at the Virginia Constitutional Convention of 1868, then served one term as a state senator (1869–71).

In January 1871, Teamoh spoke in favor of an unsuccessful bill to outlaw whipping, noting that many former slaves like himself had endured such punishments. Moreover, the Conservative bill would have disbarred anyone punished by whipping black or white from voting. Teamoh noted that " the rich man never ... steals on a small scale ... No danger of his being stretched upon that whipping post." He had one major focus, by his own admission during his time in office: the pay and work hours of Norfolk Navy Station workers. "While my efforts were untiring in other directions in support of the party, never have I labored with more determined zeal ... than that of establishing an equalization of the labor an pay in the Norfolk Navy Yard among all classes of its operatives." While Teamoh and other representatives were able to secure and eight hour work day, the Navy Department responded by cutting wages 20%, and argued reduced hours justified the pay cut. President Ulysses S. Grant had to intervene—he issued a proclamation directing that the wages of government workers should not be reduced on account of the reduced hours. The eight-hour day for federal workers came into being in 1868. At first, the law was limited to labors and mechanics largely at shipyards and army installations and did not apply to white collar office workers, yet it set labor benchmark.

== Final years and death ==
Not only did Teamoh experience the failure of the Reconstruction era government, he lost his home due to a loan that was secured on property he purchased in 1871. Teamoh blamed this faulty loan on the Tide Water Trust company and a local minister whom he referred to as "This high apostle of real estate brokerage." If the loss of his property was a bitter blow, the triumph of the so-called Redeemers, self-styled Conservatives and their opposition to the black franchise and their dismantling of all racial progress, was even more so. The ascendant Democrats also strongly opposed Reconstruction, and regained control of the United States House of Representatives in 1874. In 1877, U.S. Army Troops were removed from the South, which ended Reconstruction and all real hope of protection for newly enfranchised blacks.

In his last two decades Teamoh concentrated on writing and revising his autobiography. He said he wrote it at "the request of many friends." The manuscript was finally published, with the help of his descendants, in 1990, by Mercer University Press.

George Teamoh died sometime after 1887, at an unknown time or place. 1887 is the last year his name appears on local tax records. His wife Sallie died on 2 September 1892.

== See also ==
- African American officeholders from the end of the Civil War until before 1900
