= Thomas A. Carew =

American sculptor

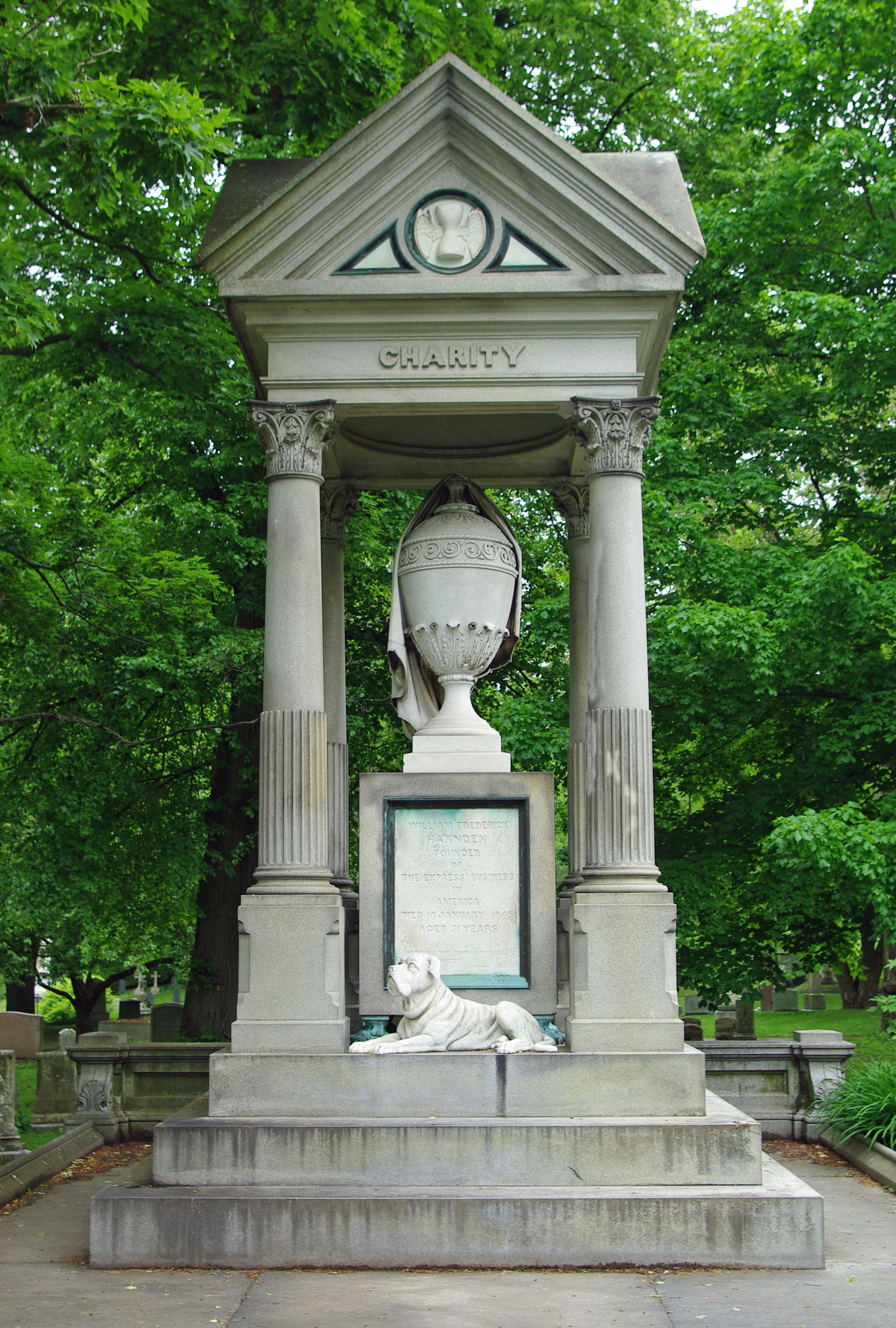
William F. Harnden Monument, Mount Auburn Cemetery

Thomas A. Carew was an American sculptor in Boston, Massachusetts, active between 1843 and 1860 in collaboration with Joseph Carew as the firm Carew & Brother.

== Selected works ==
- Charles T. Torrey, "Slave Monument" (late 1840s), Mount Auburn Cemetery
- Ralph Waldo Emerson, marble bas-relief, 1857
