= Joseph Carew =

American sculptor

Joseph Carew (c. 1820–1870) was a sculptor in Boston, Massachusetts, active between 1840 and 1870, and collaborated with Thomas A. Carew as the firm Carew & Brother. He exhibited his works frequently at the Boston Athenæum, with major exhibitions in 1853, 1859 and 1860. He also carved monuments for Mount Auburn Cemetery.

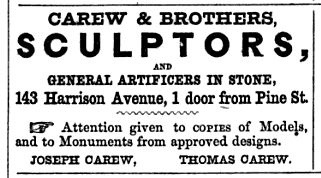
1848 ad for Carew Bros., Boston

== Selected works ==
- Charles Turner Torrey, "Slave Monument" (late 1840s), Mount Auburn Cemetery
- Ralph Waldo Emerson, marble bas-relief, 1857
