= Charles Turner Torrey =

American abolitionist (1813–1846)

A sketch of Torrey, c. 1840, from Memoir of Rev. Charles T. Torrey, Joseph P. Lovejoy, ed. (Boston: John P. Jewett & Co.), 1847

Charles Turner Torrey (November 21, 1813 – May 9, 1846) was a leading American abolitionist. Although largely lost to historians until recently, Torrey pushed the abolitionist movement to more political and aggressive strategies, including setting up one of the first highly organized lines for the Underground Railroad and personally freeing approximately 400 slaves. Torrey also worked closely with free blacks, thus becoming one of the first to consider them partners. John Brown cited Torrey as one of the three abolitionists he looked to as models for his own efforts.

== Education and early career ==
Torrey was born November 21, 1813, in Scituate, Massachusetts. By the time he was 4 years old, his mother, father, and baby sister had all died from tuberculosis, so he went to live with his maternal grandparents in a part of Scituate that later became Norwell. His maternal grandfather, once a member of the U.S. House of Representatives, remained active in local affairs, and introduced his grandson to political issues.

Torrey attended Exeter Academy in New Hampshire and was then admitted to Yale College, predecessor of Yale University, at age 16. While at Yale, Torrey attended a revival meeting, pledged his life to Jesus Christ, and thereafter took his vow very seriously. Following graduation in 1833, Torrey tried teaching secondary school for a year, but after a year decided to become a Congregational minister instead.

== Early work as an abolitionist ==
In 1834, Torrey enrolled at the Andover Theological Seminary, where slavery's abolition was a major topic of discussion. Torrey adopted the cause as his own and although tuberculosis caused him to suspend his studies for a year, he became an active worker for the Massachusetts Anti-Slavery Society, which was headed by William Lloyd Garrison. Garrison believed that slavery could best be abolished by "moral suasion," i.e., changing the way people thought about it through lectures and pamphlets.

After graduation, Torrey served Congregational pastorates in Providence, Rhode Island, and Salem, Massachusetts. However, he relinquished his professional duties to devote himself to anti-slavery activism in Maryland, having come to believe in a much more activist approach than his mentor. Torrey and Garrison disagreed on other issues as well. For example, Garrison and his female abolitionist followers wished to incorporate women's rights into the anti-slavery movement, whereas Torrey and the majority of other abolitionists thought such mixture of issues unwise.

In January 1839, Torrey and colleagues Amos Phelps, Henry Stanton, and Alanson St. Clair, challenged Garrison's leadership at the Massachusetts Anti-Slavery Society's Annual meeting. Garrison had packed the meeting with his followers, and easily beat back the challenge in a dramatic confrontation. Torrey and his allies responded by establishing a new abolitionist association, commonly referred to as the New Organization, to distinguish it from Garrison's Old Organization. This split became known as the great schism in the abolitionist movement.

The New Organization immediately adopted a more activist, and overtly political, approach to the abolition of slavery. In July 1839, almost 500 delegates met in Albany to discuss the formation of a political party devoted exclusively to abolitionism. Finally, on April 1, 1840, at another meeting in Albany, the Liberty Party was formed. Torrey was one of the vice-presidents of the organizing meeting. Following the meeting, he became the Liberty Party organizer for Massachusetts.

Torrey was one of the original founders of the Boston Vigilance Committee in 1841, and served briefly as its secretary.

== Freeing slaves ==
By the end of 1841, Torrey had tired of the slow pace of political abolitionism and went to Washington, D.C., as a reporter for several abolitionist newspapers. It seems likely that he had already formulated a plan to free slaves. He immediately began attending black churches and befriending abolitionist members of Congress, especially Joshua Giddings of Ohio. In January 1842, Torrey, as a reporter, attended a convention of Maryland slaveholders in Annapolis, where he was arrested, charged with writing "incendiary" material, and jailed for four days.

Following his release from jail, Torrey continued using his cover as a reporter but immediately organized an elaborate Underground Railroad route from Washington to Baltimore, Philadelphia, and Albany. He worked closely with Thomas Smallwood, a free black. Together, they solicited slaves in Washington to run away, then transported them north to freedom in Pennsylvania. There, they were conducted through a series of safe houses, mostly owned by Quakers, to Philadelphia, Albany, and ultimately, for many, Canada. Torrey and his colleagues rented horses and wagons and often transported as many as 15 or 20 slaves at a time. Torrey and Smallwood specifically targeted slaves owned by Southern members of Congress and important political figures so as to cause as much public disruption as possible. Professor Stanley Harrold offered the first academic account of Torrey's slave-freeing exploits.

By October 1842, Torrey had been targeted by the police in Washington for his activities, so he moved to Albany. Smallwood continued to recruit slaves to run away until the spring of 1843, by which time they had freed approximately 400 slaves. Smallwood then also moved north because of the danger of arrest.

Much of the funding for Torrey and Smallwood's work apparently came from Gerrit Smith, a wealthy abolitionist from upstate New York. In November 1843, Torrey and Smallwood returned to Washington, despite both being wanted by the police, and narrowly escaped arrest. Smallwood thereafter settled in Toronto, but Torrey went to Baltimore, where he continued the freeing of slaves. Finally, in June 1844, Torrey was arrested and put in jail. He was said to have been armed with two pistols at the time of his arrest.

== Prison and death ==
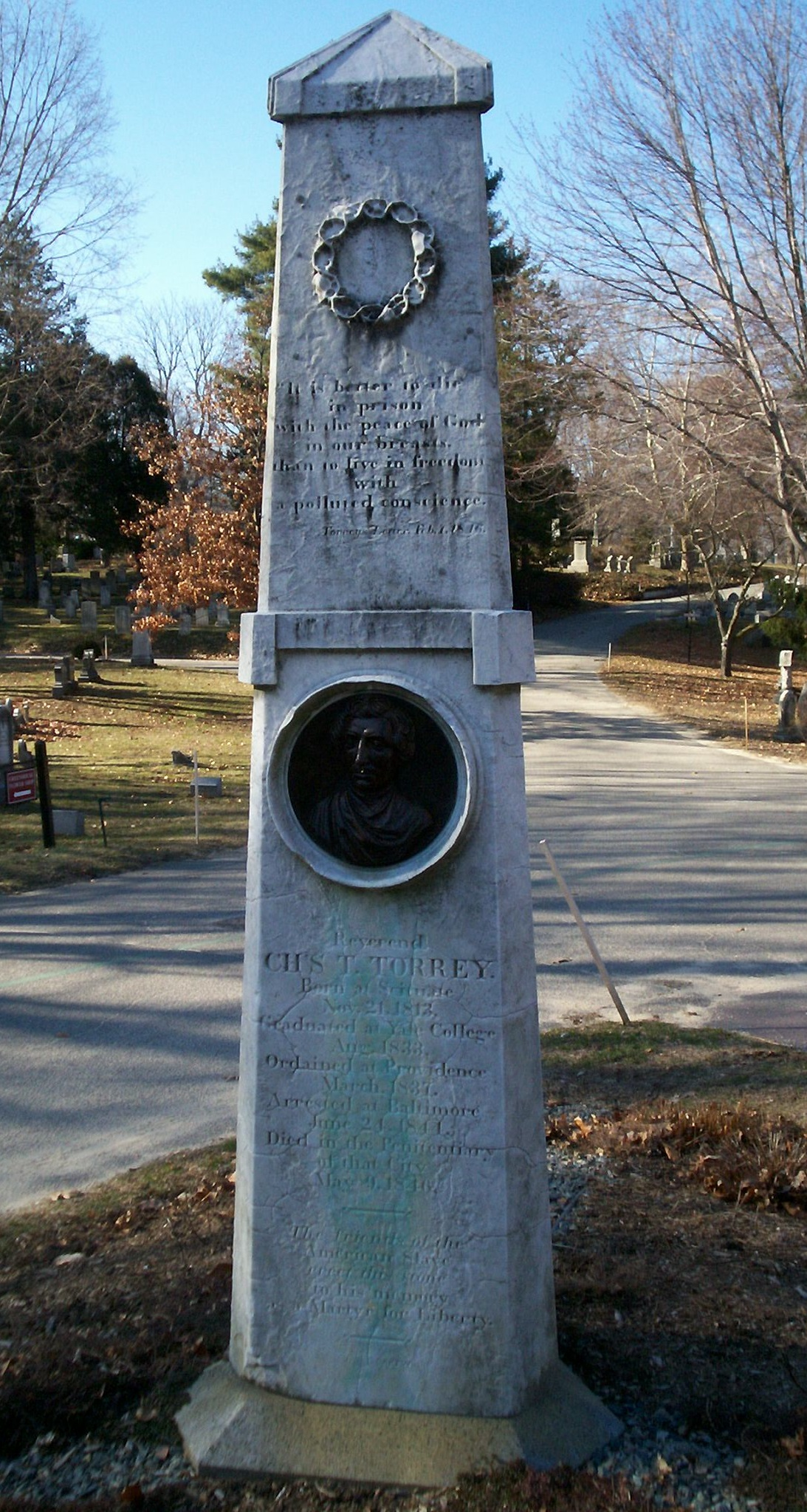
Monument for Charles Turner Torrey by sculptor Joseph Carew at Mount Auburn Cemetery

Torrey was charged with three counts of stealing slaves. He initially regarded his arrest as an opportunity to challenge the constitutional legitimacy of slaveholding in general; if it was not legitimate, then freeing slaves would not be a crime. By September 1844, it was clear that this strategy was not going to work, so he attempted to break out of jail and almost succeeded. He wrote to his wife that the jailbreak was foiled by the betrayal of a fellow prisoner, by the name of Dryer, who was, as it happened, a "negro trader" in prison on charges of counterfeiting money.

In December, Torrey was tried, convicted, and sentenced to six years in the state penitentiary. Prison conditions caused the return of Torrey's tuberculosis. Throughout New England, including Lowell, Massachusetts, people established Torrey Committees to raise money in support of Torrey's legal defense. Clemency requests were made by Linus Child (Agent/CEO of the Boott Cotton Mills) Lowell, Massachusetts to Governor Francis Thomas of Maryland, which were denied initially; however, when the Governor gave in and sent his pardon, the letter arrived to the prison on the same day Torrey died (May 9, 1846).

His corpse was taken to Boston, and many people attended his funeral at Tremont Temple. He was buried at Mount Auburn Cemetery in Cambridge, Massachusetts, where a monument with a figure of a female slave was erected over his grave. The Anti-Slavery Society and abolitionist Photius Fisk funded the monument. "Torrey's blood crieth out" became an abolitionist battle cry, and the story of his sufferings and death excited eager interest both in the United States and in Europe, giving new impetus to the anti-slavery cause.

He was replaced as head of the Washington Underground Railroad by William L. Chaplin.

Joseph Cammett Lovejoy, whose brother Elijah Lovejoy was murdered by a mob for publishing an abolitionist newspaper, wrote Memoir of Rev. Charles T. Torrey: Who Died in the Penitentiary of Maryland, where He was Confined for Showing Mercy to the Poor, published in 1847.

== Assessment ==
Following the end of the Civil War, Charles Torrey was essentially lost to history. The main reason for this was that the history of the abolitionist movement was mostly written by Garrison and his supporters, most of whom were still alive. By contrast, most of Torrey's supporters had died. Despite his relatively brief abolitionist career, Torrey made major contributions to the freeing of slaves.

- He co-led the 1839 challenge to William Lloyd Garrison's leadership, resulting in the permanent schism between Garrison's "old" and Torrey's "new" abolitionists. The new group was much more aggressive in their tactics. Garrison and Torrey were hated rivals.
- He cofounded the 1840 Liberty Party, whose sole platform was the abolition of slavery.
- He established in 1842 the first highly organized Underground Railroad route, running from Washington, DC, to Albany, NY. He was referred to by some at that time as the "father" of the Underground Railroad.
- He personally freed about 400 slaves, more than most other abolitionists. Torrey took the slaves from the Washington and Baltimore region and specifically recruited slaves owned by Southern members of Congress and other high government officials.
- He was one of the first white abolitionists to work closely with black counterparts, staying at their homes and sharing the dangers of their task.
- He strongly influenced the aggressive abolitionists who followed him. John Brown, for example, cited Torrey as one of the three abolitionists he looked to as models for his own efforts.

== Publications ==
- Home, or the Pilgrim's Faith Revived, a volume of sketches of life in Massachusetts, which Torrey prepared in prison (1846)
