= Thomas Smallwood =

- Born: 1801 February 22; Prince George's County, Maryland
- Died: 1883 May 10; Necropolis Cemetery, Toronto, Ontario, Canada
- Spouse: Elizabeth Smallwood

Thomas Smallwood (1801–1883) was a freedman, "a daring activist and searing writer" who worked alongside fellow abolitionist Charles Turner Torrey on the Underground Railroad. The two men created what some historians believe was the first branch of the underground railroad that ran through Washington, D.C., which they operated from 1842 to 1844. After their involvement ceased, the network continued to exist in Washington for another two decades. Smallwood also wrote for Torrey's Albany, New York antislavery newspaper, Tocsin of Liberty, as its Washington correspondent.

== Biography ==
Thomas Smallwood was born into slavery in Prince George's County, Maryland on 22 February 1801. As a small child, he and his sister Catherine's ownership was transferred through inheritance to Sarah and the Rev. John B. Ferguson. The Reverend Ferguson taught young Thomas Smallwood to read and write. He later filed a deed of manumission in 1815 when Thomas was fourteen, pledging to set him free at age 30 in exchange for $500 and filed a similar manumission for his sister Kitty. Smallwood was freed in 1831 and began work in Washington as a shoemaker. From 1822 to 1830, Smallwood was a strong advocate for the African Colonization Society. However, he was misled on the true beliefs that this society stood for. He believed their goal was to abolish slavery, however, it was the opposite, they wanted to get rid of the free African population by relocating them to Africa.

Smallwood was deeply motivated by the humiliations he experienced as a slave and his Christian beliefs to engage in antislavery activity. Smallwood opposed manumission, or the legal purchasing of slaves to secure their freedom. But his options for bolder action were limited by the fact that he was living in a region of the country controlled by slaveholders.

In Washington, Smallwood worked near Washington Navy Yard where he operated a small shoe making and repair business. Acquaintances began to refer to him as "Smallwood of the Yard" although surviving muster and pay records do not show him directly employed by the navy. He also attended Ebenezer Methodist church on Capitol Hill in the 1820s and 1830s where many employees of the navy yard worshiped. At Ebenezer, Smallwood and his family found fellowship, and camaraderie and had the opportunity to take part in a progressive and active religious community. Many African Americans during this period found Methodism congenial. The appeal of this relatively new religion was both the emphasis on individual personal conversion, and in theory, the equality of all the faithful before God. Slaves and free people of color took part in adult classes, religious instruction, and gained the opportunity in church sponsored adult classes to learn to write and read scripture. Attendees included a wide range of community leaders including diarist Michael Shiner, Moses Liverpool, Nicholas Franklin and Sophia Bell all leaders in the African American community. In 1836 Thomas Smallwood was in the same adult class no.16, as Michael Shiner's wife Phillis.

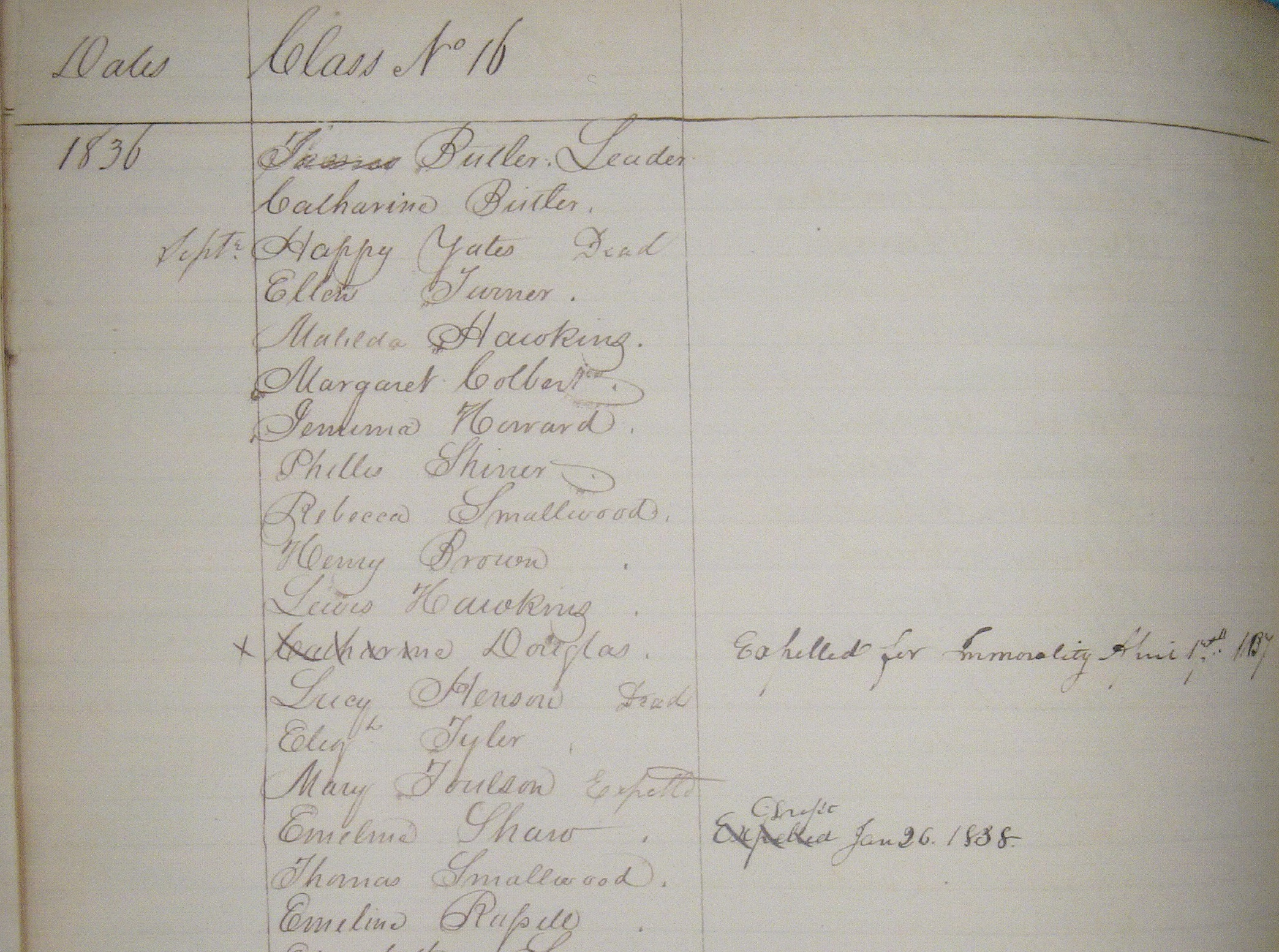
Phillis Shiner & noted Abolitionist Thomas Smallwood,1836, Ebenezer Methodist church class

Then, in early 1842, Smallwood read about Charles Turner Torrey, an antislavery activist who was jailed in Annapolis, Maryland for attempting to report on a legislative convention of Maryland slaveholders. Smallwood became familiarized with Torrey through his wife because she worked in his home. Smallwood arranged their introduction. According to Smallwood, Torrey immediately invited him to help plan the escape of a slave family owned by George E. Badger. The North Carolina plantation owner had plans to sell the family down south. But escape plans fell apart when the mother opted to try to raise money for her family's freedom instead. In 1842 -1843 Thomas Smallwood began writing letters to the Albany Patriot, an abolitionist paper, published by Charles Torrey. In his regular letters Smallwood used humor to denigrate slaveholders, and expose the terror they imposed on the enslaved. He also celebrated freedom seekers and their clever ruses. Smallwood's column did not hold back, he named and shamed for example, his 14 June 1843 letter, which described Captain Pendegrass USN of the Washington Navy Yard, whipping an enslaved woman in public on the navy yard itself, with impunity.

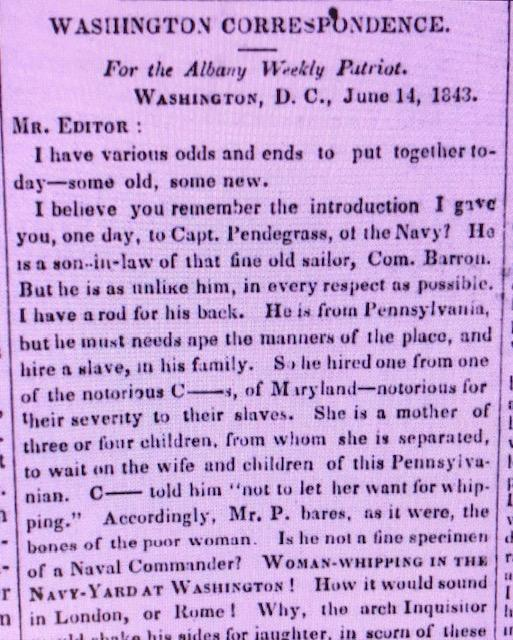
1843 Letter by Thomas Smallwood aka Samuel Weller Jr., describing whipping of enslaved Black woman

Smallwood and Torrey proceeded anyway with building an underground railroad network in Washington. They had two places that they collected deposits from for those that they helped travel along the Underground Railroad. This was necessary as he had to pay the teamsters and any means of conveyances.

The fugitives they secreted north were mostly local slaves whom Torrey or Smallwood met in church, or whom Smallwood met through work at Navy Yard or through the literacy classes he taught. The two men recruited and guided escaped slaves while Smallwood's wife, Elizabeth Smallwood, and his landlady sometimes harbored the fugitives in Smallwood's Washington home. At least once, Captain John H. Goddard, the leader of Washington's police force and de facto antislavery patrol, searched the Smallwood household as a fugitive slave fled out the back door. The pair often paid local black men to assist them. They also relied on the help of a freedman, Jacob Gibbs, who ran an underground network in Baltimore. Smallwood also went to lengths to exclude from their new network people he felt were motivated by profit.

Daily Herald 1843-12-06 (3) New Haven Connecticut notice re Thomas Smallwood and escaped slave

Smallwood and Torrey's first fugitive party was a group of 15 men, women, and children who successfully escaped to Canada. After Torrey relocated to Albany, Smallwood led several more northward escapes by himself. But fears that he was no longer safe from arrest convinced Smallwood to move to Toronto in June 1843. He moved his wife and children to the city that October. Shortly thereafter, Smallwood and Torrey launched their final joint mission, an ill-fated attempt to rescue the families of four escaped black men who approached Smallwood in Toronto. With material support from northern abolitionists such as Thomas Garrett, Torrey and Smallwood met the escapees in Washington. But they narrowly missed capture by Goddard. Smallwood was encountering many obstacles while trying to help slaves and their journey to the North. He became well known to slaveholders; therefore, it was extremely risky for him to stay in the United States, and he was encouraged by Torrey to return to Canada indefinitely

Smallwood fled on foot to Baltimore, where Gibbs helped arrange his return to Toronto. He arrived in Toronto, Canada on December 23, 1843. Smallwood lived the rest of his life in Toronto, where he operated a saw mill and became a prominent member of the city's black leadership. He also expressed opposition to the Refugee Home Society which was created by Henry Bibb because he believed that Blacks should be independent and not take any funds from whites, as well as opposition to the enforcement of segregation.

== Family ==
After Smallwood was freed, he married a free Black woman Elizabeth Anderson and they had five children together. While their marriage was officially recorded in court records in 1836, Smallwood in his memoir dates their union to a decade earlier, in 1826. By Smallwood's own account Elizabeth actively and continually assist him in organizing escapes. He wrote she was able to find a generous benefactor to aid those fleeing North and praised her presence of mind and ingenuity to remove obstacles.

== Career and life in Toronto ==
From 1846 to his death in 1883, Thomas Smallwood worked many jobs which were captured through the home and city directories in Toronto, Ontario. During this period, he worked in the saw business as a saw sharpener, setter, filer, and dresser. These jobs began on York Street, carried into Queen Street West, and ended on 18 Elizabeth Street. From 1874 to 1878, Smallwood also took on a second job as a bricklayer. Similarly, his son William Smallwood (1861-1927), took on the role as bricklayer in the year of 1874, alongside his father on Chestnut Street.

== Death ==
Smallwood died of old age in Toronto on May 10, 1883, and was buried in the Toronto Necropolis the following day.
