= Court House Square (Charleston) =

Coordinates: 32°46′35.814″N 79°55′52.75″W

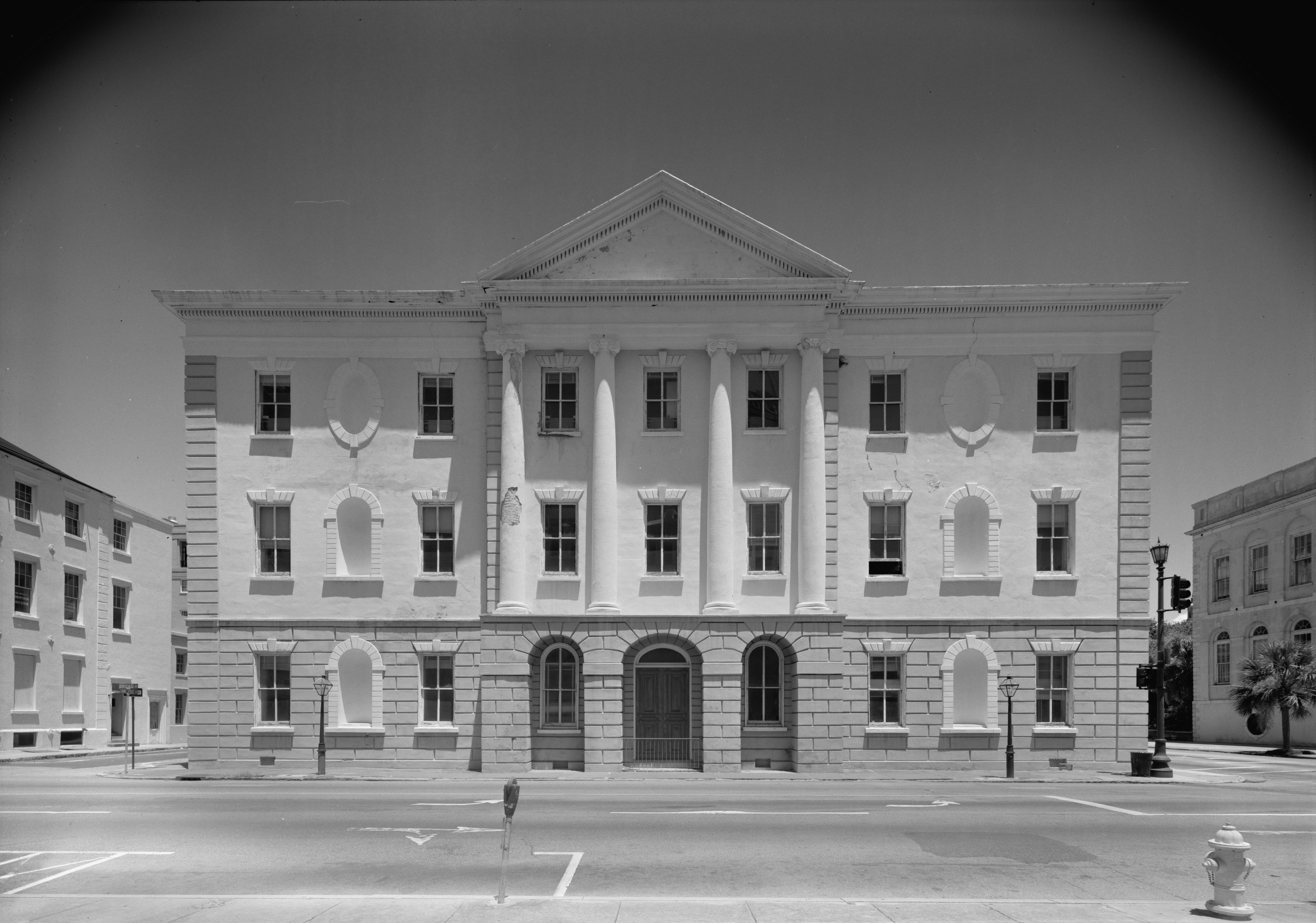
Charleston County Courthouse (1790–92), James Hoban, architect. A likely model for The White House.

Court House Square is the location of Charleston County Courthouse in downtown Charleston, South Carolina, at the intersection of Meeting and Broad Streets. It is historically known as "the Four Corners of Law" because the intersection hosted buildings from each level of government: the Courthouse (state law), City Hall (municipal law), the Federal Building and U.S. Post Office (federal law), and Saint Michael's Episcopal Church (canon law).

Charleston County Courthouse (1790–92) was designed by the Irish-born American architect James Hoban. President George Washington visited Charleston in May 1791, may have met with Hoban, and summoned the architect to Philadelphia, Pennsylvania (the temporary national capital) in June 1792. The following month, Hoban was named winner of the design competition for The White House in Washington, DC.

The Courthouse itself is still in use, located in the historic district near the park at Washington Square. It was built on the site of and incorporated the ruins of the South Carolina Statehouse (1753, burned 1788), the capitol building for the Colony of South Carolina under British Rule.
