= Charleston County Courthouse =

- U.S. National Historic Landmark District – Contributing property
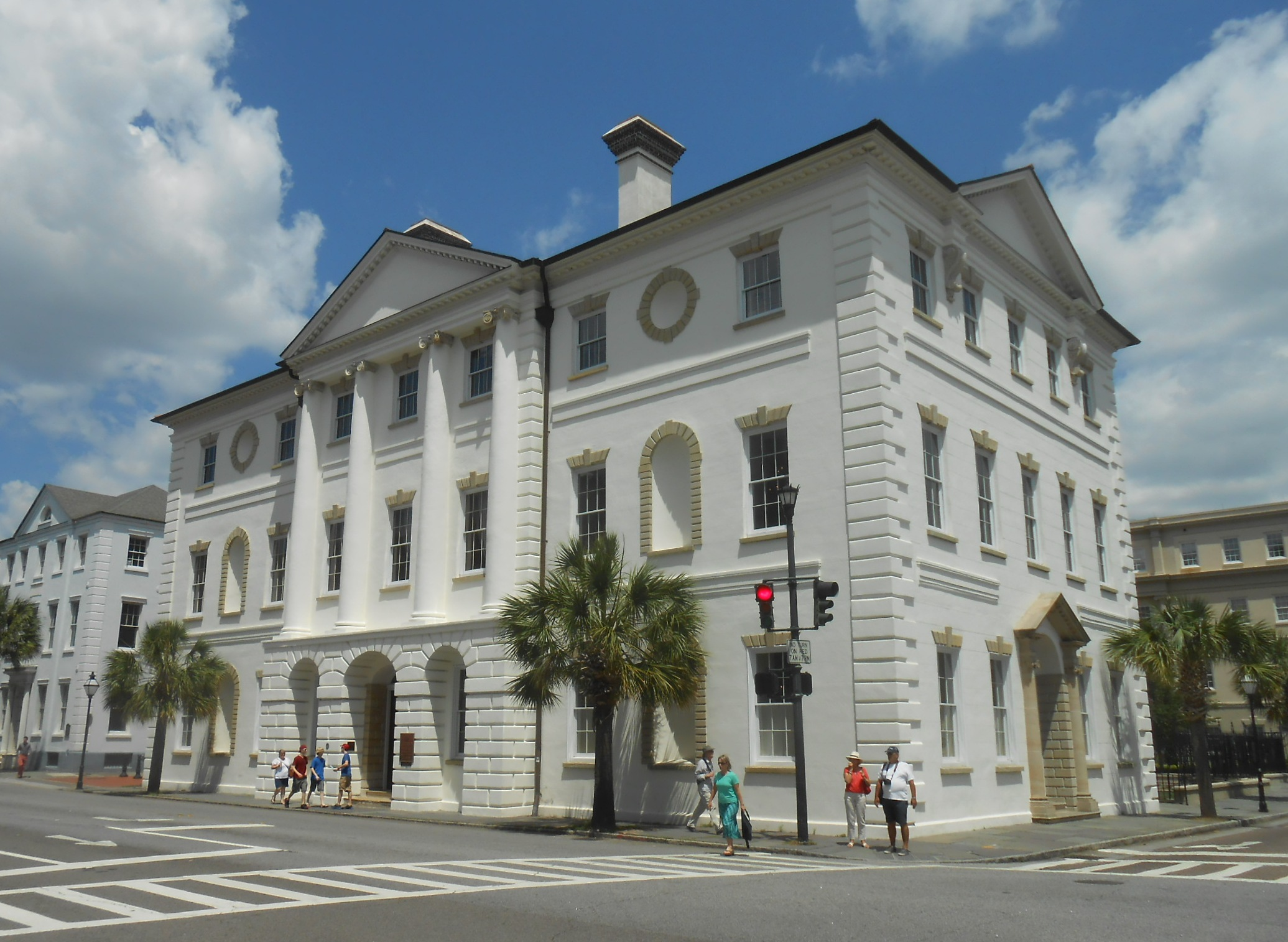
- Charleston County Courthouse, southeast corner

- Location within South Carolina Location within the United States
- Interactive map showing the location of Charleston County Courthouse
- Location: 84 Broad Street, Charleston, South Carolina, U.S.
- Coordinates: 32°46′35.814″N 79°55′52.752″W
- Built: 1790–1792
- Architect: James Hoban
- Architectural style: Neoclassical
- Part of: Charleston Old and Historic District

Charleston County Courthouse (1790–1792) is a Neoclassical building in Charleston, South Carolina, designed by Irish architect James Hoban. It was a likely model for Hoban's most famous building, the White House, and both buildings are modeled after Leinster House, the current seat of the Irish Parliament in Dublin.

President George Washington visited Charleston on his Southern Tour in May 1791, may have met with Hoban, and summoned the architect to Philadelphia, the national capital at the time, in June 1792. The following month, Hoban was named the winner of the design competition for the presidential mansion, later named the White House, in Washington, D.C. He later altered his design under Washington's influence.

In 1883–1884, the courthouse underwent a large renovation performed by Kerrigan & Grant.

The Courthouse remains in use, located in the historic district near the park at Washington Square. It was built on the site of and incorporated the ruins of the South Carolina Statehouse (1753, burned 1788), the capitol building for the Colony of South Carolina under British colonial rule. Hoban also designed a new statehouse building nearby, which was burned down during the Civil War.

== See also ==
- Court House Square (Charleston)
- Charleston Historic District
- South Carolina Provincial Congress
