= The King's Hospital =

Private school in Palmerstown, Dublin, Ireland

- Scoil Ospidéal an Rí
- Hospitium Regis

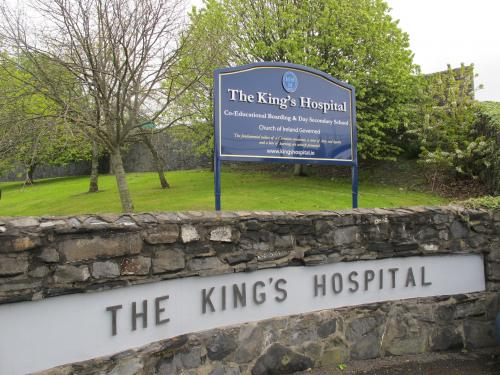
- Entrance to King's Hospital

Location
- Palmerstown, Dublin; Ireland; 53.3588°N 6.3859°W

Information
- Type: Private day and boarding school Public School
- Motto: A School And A Way Of Life
- Religious affiliation: Church of Ireland
- Established: 1669; 357 years ago
- Chairman: Angus Potterton (Chairman of the Board of Governors)
- Principal: Mark Wallace
- Years: Forms 1-6 Age 12-18
- Gender: male and female
- Age: 12+
- Enrollment: 700 (approximately 1/3 are boarders ).
- Houses: Mercer House, Desmond House, Blackhall House, Swift House, Stuart House, Bluecoat House, Ormonde House, Ivory House, Morgan House, Grace House
- Colours: Navy blue and Yellow
- Website: kingshospital.ie

The Hospital and Free School of King Charles II, Oxmantown, also called The King's Hospital (KH; Irish: Scoil Ospidéal an Rí) is a Church of Ireland co-educational private day and boarding school situated in Palmerstown, Dublin, Ireland. It is on an 80-acre campus beside the River Liffey, called Brooklawn, named after the country houses situated on the site and in which the headmaster and his family reside. The school is also a member of the HMC Headmasters' and Headmistresses' Conference and the BSA.

Founded in 1669, it is one of the oldest schools in Ireland and was also known as the Blue Coat School. Although priority is given to those of the main Protestant denominations, as a Christian school, it is attended by students of other Christian denominations and other faiths. The school's colours are navy and gold. The school crest is three burning castles with the date "1669", almost identical to the crest for Dublin city. The current headmaster is Mark Wallace.

== History ==
=== Founding ===
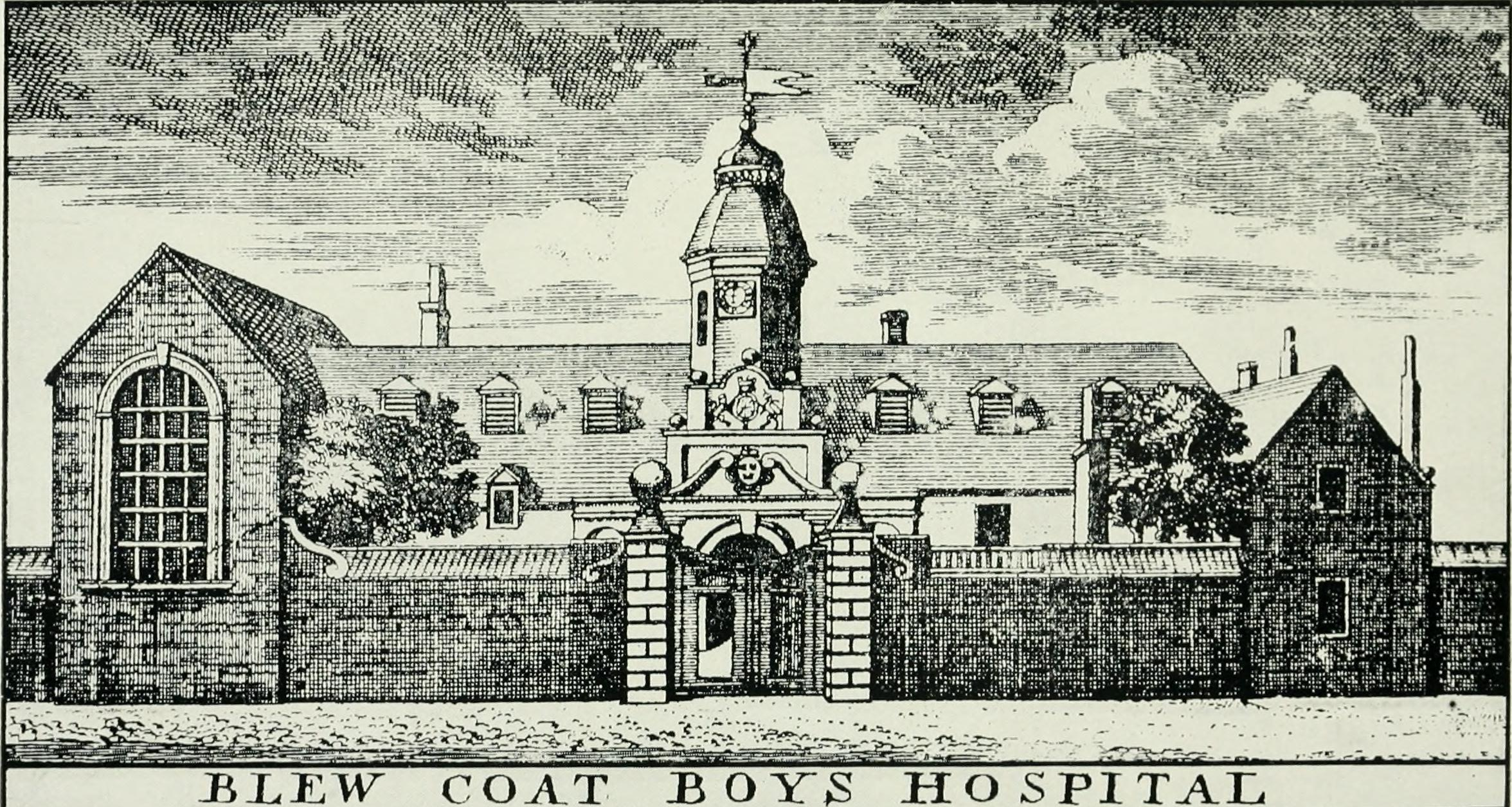
An illustration of the school from Charles Brooking's map of Dublin (1728). The building was constructed between 1669 and 1673 and was demolished around 1772.

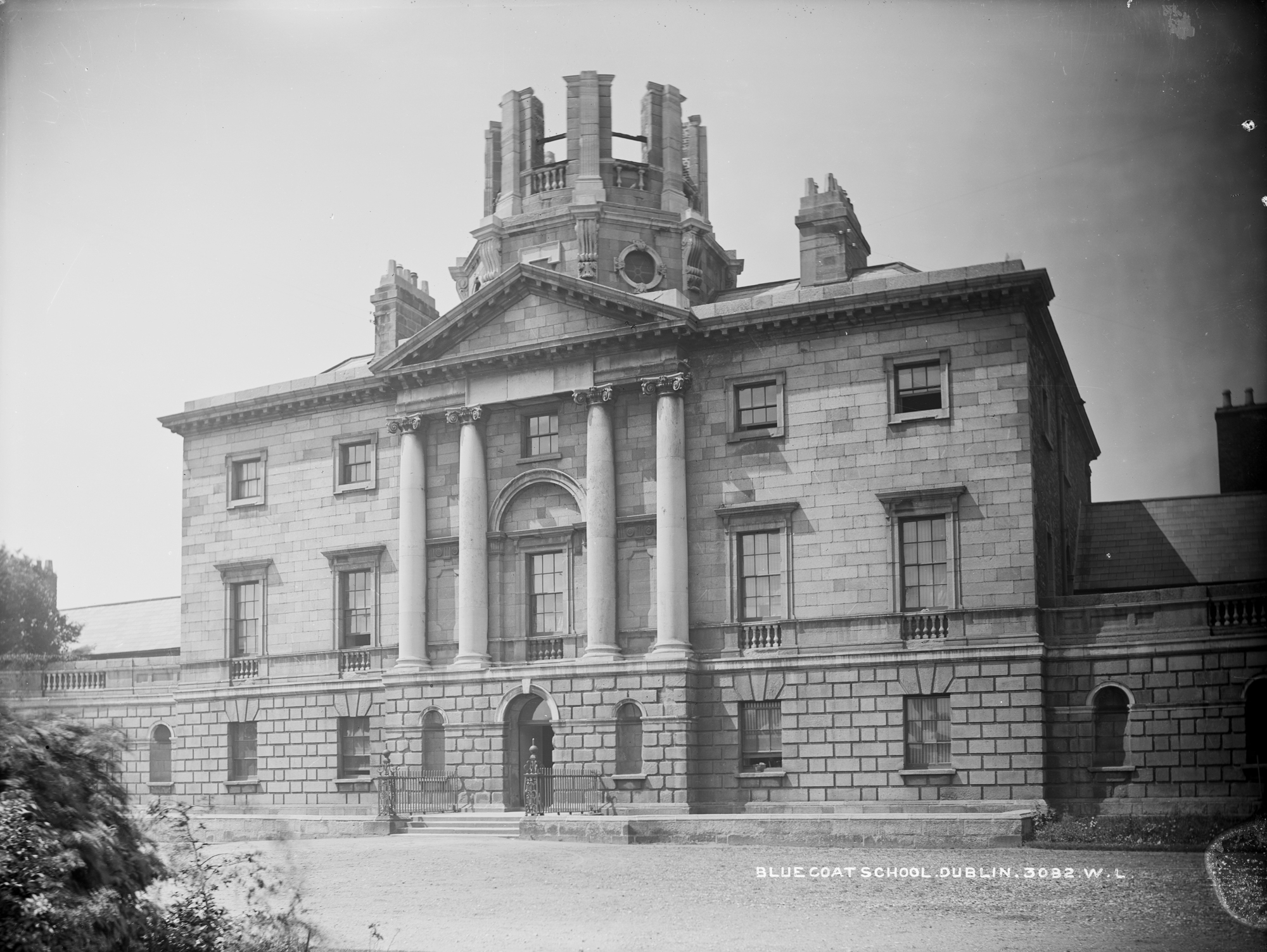
The Blackhall Place building, circa 1890. A new cupola was being added.

The school was founded in 1669 as The Hospital and Free School of King Charles II and was located in Queen Street, Dublin. King's Hospital was a continuation of the old Free School of Dublin. On 5 May 1674, the school opened with 60 pupils, including 3 girls.

During the early seventeenth and early eighteenth centuries, it was used as the site of elections to the Irish Parliament's Dublin City constituency. When this was changed to the Tholsel for the 1713 general election, it led to the Dublin election riot.

=== New building of 1783 ===
From 1783 to 1971, the school was located in Blackhall Place, Dublin, later the headquarters of the Law Society of Ireland in a building and amongst a street plan that was designed by the architect Thomas Ivory and encompassed much of what was previously the land of Oxmantown Green.

The take-over of Morgan's School (1957) contributed to steadily increasing numbers of students, and by 1970, a need for extra space and facilities led to the move from the city centre to a modern purpose-built school set in its own 100-acre (400,000 m^{2}) site on the banks of the River Liffey in Palmerstown, County Dublin.

=== Erwin Schrödinger ===
A 57-year-old manuscript by the Nobel Prize in Physics winning physicist Erwin Schrödinger resurfaced at the school in 2012. Entitled "Fragment From An Unpublished Dialogue Of Galileo", it was written for the school's 1955 edition of the annual Blue Coat magazine to coincide with Schrödinger leaving Dublin to take up his appointment as Chair of Physics at the University of Vienna. Schrödinger wrote the manuscript for the school's former English teacher and Editor of the Blue Coat magazine, Ronnie Anderson (now deceased), a friend of Schrödinger when he lived in Dublin. It is now in the possession of King's Hospital alumnus Professor Jonathan Coleman in CRANN at Trinity College Dublin.

== 2016 allegation of abuse ==
In December 2016, there was an allegation that in November 2016 a thirteen-year-old boy who was a boarder at the school had been sexually abused by eight other pupils, and forced to fight with another boy. There were said to have been around fifteen boys looking on. The Gardaí investigated, as did Tusla. Eight pupils were suspended by the school. There were comments by government ministers on the case; Richard Bruton, the minister for education, was described as "exceptionally distressed" by it. Leo Varadkar said the allegation was "very serious and troubling". The school was criticised for not informing the Gardaí for several days. The magazine Village said that "The story centred on a failure by school authorities to inform the child-protection body TUSLA in a timely manner". The scene described in the allegation was compared to the Lord of the Flies. In January 2017, the Gardaí said that they were at an "advanced stage" of their investigations, but it was unlikely that charges would be brought. They continued to be "deeply unhappy" with the school's delay in reporting.

== Structure ==
The school is co-educational and caters for some 720 pupils, with 408 day pupils and 292 boarders in 2023/24. The King's Hospital has students from all over Ireland and from overseas. Students from Germany and Spain are the most common international students.

The School is divided into five boarding houses: Bluecoat, Mercer, Grace, Morgan and Ormonde and five-day pupil houses. Each boarding house has its own resident housemaster or housemistress.

== Sport ==
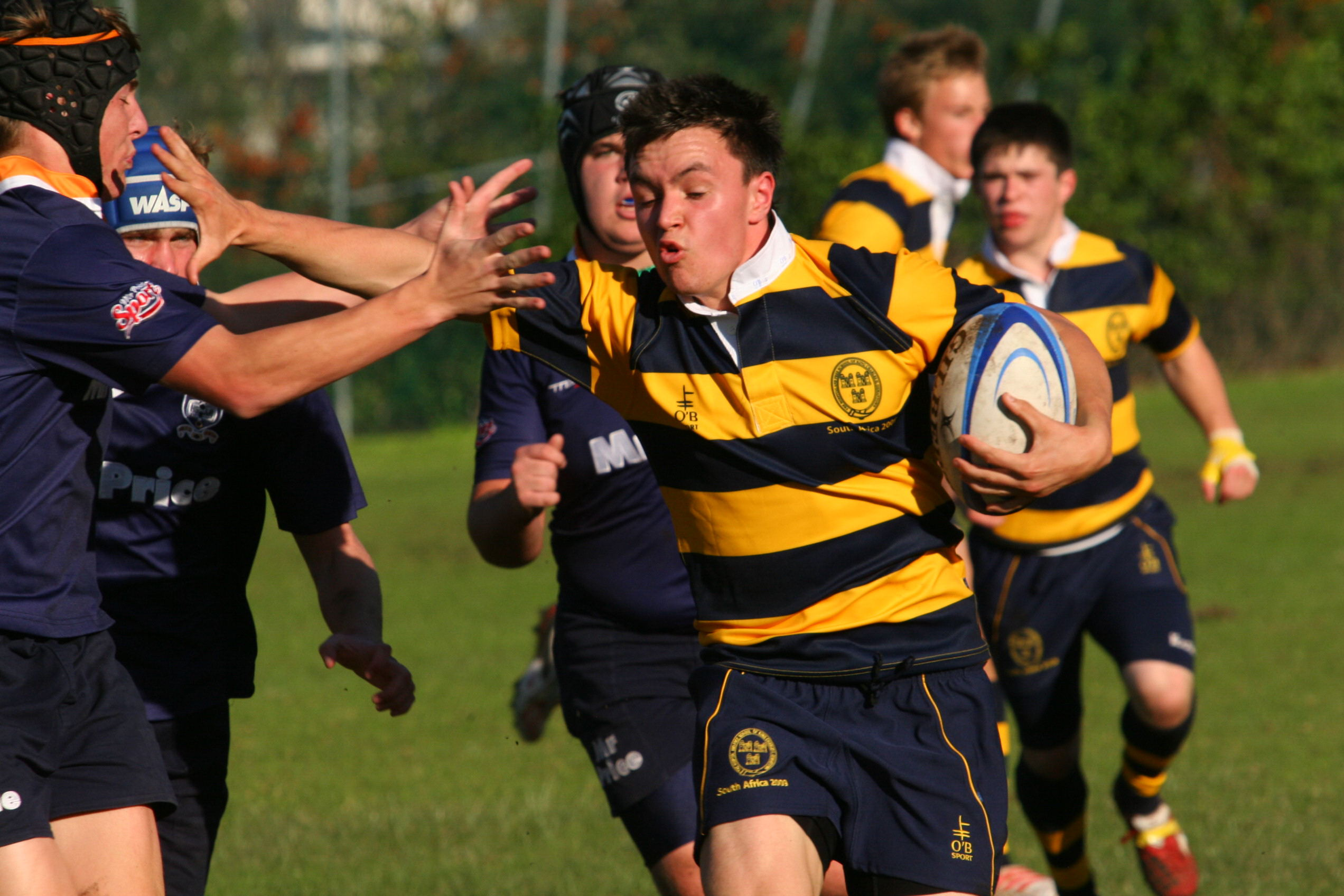
Rugby being played at King's Hospital

The school has a gymnasium and sports hall with an advanced fitness centre. The school also has access to a swimming pool, astroturf hockey pitches, rugby pitches and tennis courts.

Various sports are played on campus and training is provided by staff. The school has teams for rugby, hockey, cricket, athletics, cross-country, badminton, soccer, basketball and swimming.

Rugby has been the most competitive boys sport for many years with the team playing at a high level. They regularly compete in the Leinster Schools Senior Cup reaching the final in 1982 and have won the Vinnie Murray Cup on two occasions in 2006 and 2015. They have also won the Leinster Schools Senior League twice in 1997 and 2004.They have produced two men's senior internationals as well as three Rugby Sevens Olympians.

== Notable past pupils ==
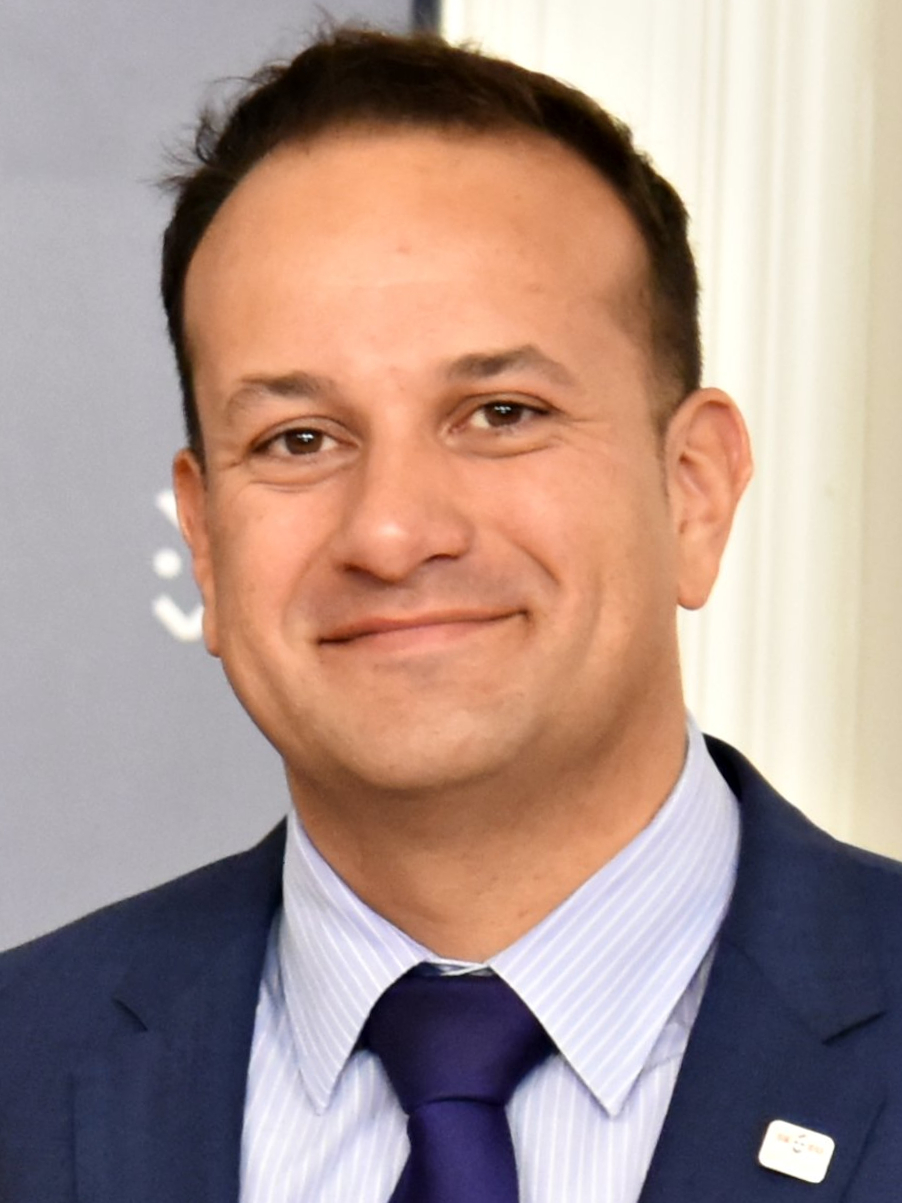
Past pupil Taoiseach Leo Varadkar TD

- Jack Boothman - Former President of the GAA (1994 and 1997)
- Jonathan Coleman - lecturer in the School of Physics in CRANN at Trinity College Dublin and the 2011 Science Foundation Ireland 'Researcher of the Year'
- Harvey du Cros - financier; the founder of the pneumatic tire industry based on the discovery of John Boyd Dunlop
- Niall Hogan - co-founder of Touchtech Payments, bought by billion-dollar online global payments company Stripe in 2019
- Laura Modi - founder of American infant formula company Bobbie.
- Randal Plunkett, 21st Baron of Dunsany - film producer
- Charles Tyndall - 13th Bishop of Kilmore, Elphin and Ardagh.
- Robert Warke - 18th Bishop of Cork, Cloyne and Ross
- John Weir - Loyalist murderer and member of the Glenanne gang;

=== Politics ===
- Robert Dowds - former Labour Party TD for the Dublin Mid-West constituency from 2011 to 2016.
- Roderic O'Gorman - Green Party leader and former Minister for Children, Equality, Disability, Integration and Youth
- Leo Varadkar - 14th Taoiseach of Ireland (2017–2020 and 2022–2024)

=== Music and Arts ===
- Denise Chaila - Irish and Zambian rapper, singer, poet, grime and hip-hop artist based in Limerick.
- John and Edward Grimes - members of the pop duo Jedward
- Lisa Hannigan - Irish folk/pop singer famous for her recordings with Damien Rice
- Lara McDonnell - Irish actress
- Tom Murphy - Tony Award-winning Irish actor
- Andy Orr - member of the pop group Six
- Christopher Moriarty - international clarinettist, winner of 2016 Irish Musician of the Year
- Kathryn Thomas - Irish television presenter

=== Sports ===
- Grainne Clancy - former Irish international cricketer.
- Noel Mahony - first-class cricketer for Ireland and president of the Irish Cricket Union, also taught mathematics at the school.
- Angus McKeen - former Leinster and Ireland rugby prop forward
- Robin Roe - former captain of the Ireland national rugby union team. Also capped with the British & Irish Lions and The Barbarians

==== Olympians ====
(Republic of Ireland) Ireland

- Kathy Baker - Rugby Sevens in 2024
- Natalya Coyle - Modern Pentathlon in 2012, 2016
- Ian Fitzpatrick - Rugby Sevens in 2020
- Heike Holstein - Dressage in 1996, 2000, 2004, 2020
- Erin King - Rugby Sevens in 2024
- Patrick McMillan - Downhill Skiing in 2018
- Sara Tracey - Track and Field in 2012, 2016
- Carlos O'Connell - Decathlon in 1988
- Judy Reynolds - Dressage in 2016
- Camilla Speirs - Dressage in 2012

Nigeria

- Seye Ogunlewe - Sprinter in 2016

== Notable headmasters ==
- 1922–1927: John Mason Harden
