= Thomas Ivory (Irish architect) =

- Born: County Cork, Ireland
- Died: 1786; Dublin
- Occupation: Architect
- Buildings: Blue Coat School; Newcomen Bank

Thomas Ivory (died 1786) was an Irish architect, one of the significant figures in the building of Georgian Dublin. He is often called "Thomas Ivory of Cork", and is to be distinguished from his contemporary Thomas Ivory of Norwich.

== Life ==
Said to have been a carpenter's apprentice self-educated, and from Cork, Ivory worked in Dublin under the gunsmith Thomas Truelock (1720-1798), who was later Sheriff of Dublin City in 1774.

He then studied under the draughtsman "Mr Bell Mires" (Jonas Blaymire).

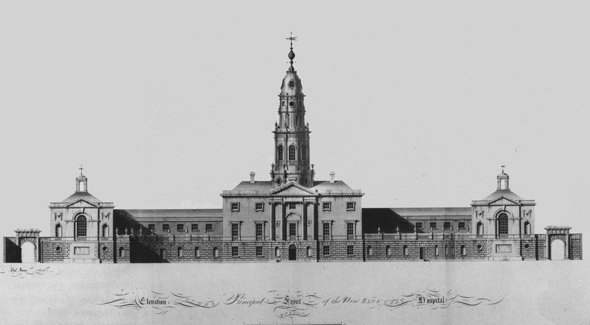
Engraving after Thomas Ivory, competition entry (1772) for the Blue Coat School, Dublin

Ivory practised in Dublin, and was appointed master of architectural drawing in the schools of the Royal Dublin Society on Grafton Street in 1759. He held the post till his death, and among his pupils were Henry Aaron Baker, James Hoban and Martin Archer Shee. Thomas Roberts was articled to him.

Ivory died in Dublin in December 1786.

== Works ==
In 1765, Ivory prepared designs and an estimate for additional buildings to the Royal Dublin Society premises in Shaw's Court, but these were not executed. Ivory's major work was Blue Coat School in Blackhall Place (commonly known as the Blue Coat Hospital), in the classic style. The first stone was laid on 16 June 1773, but from want of money the central cupola was not finished.

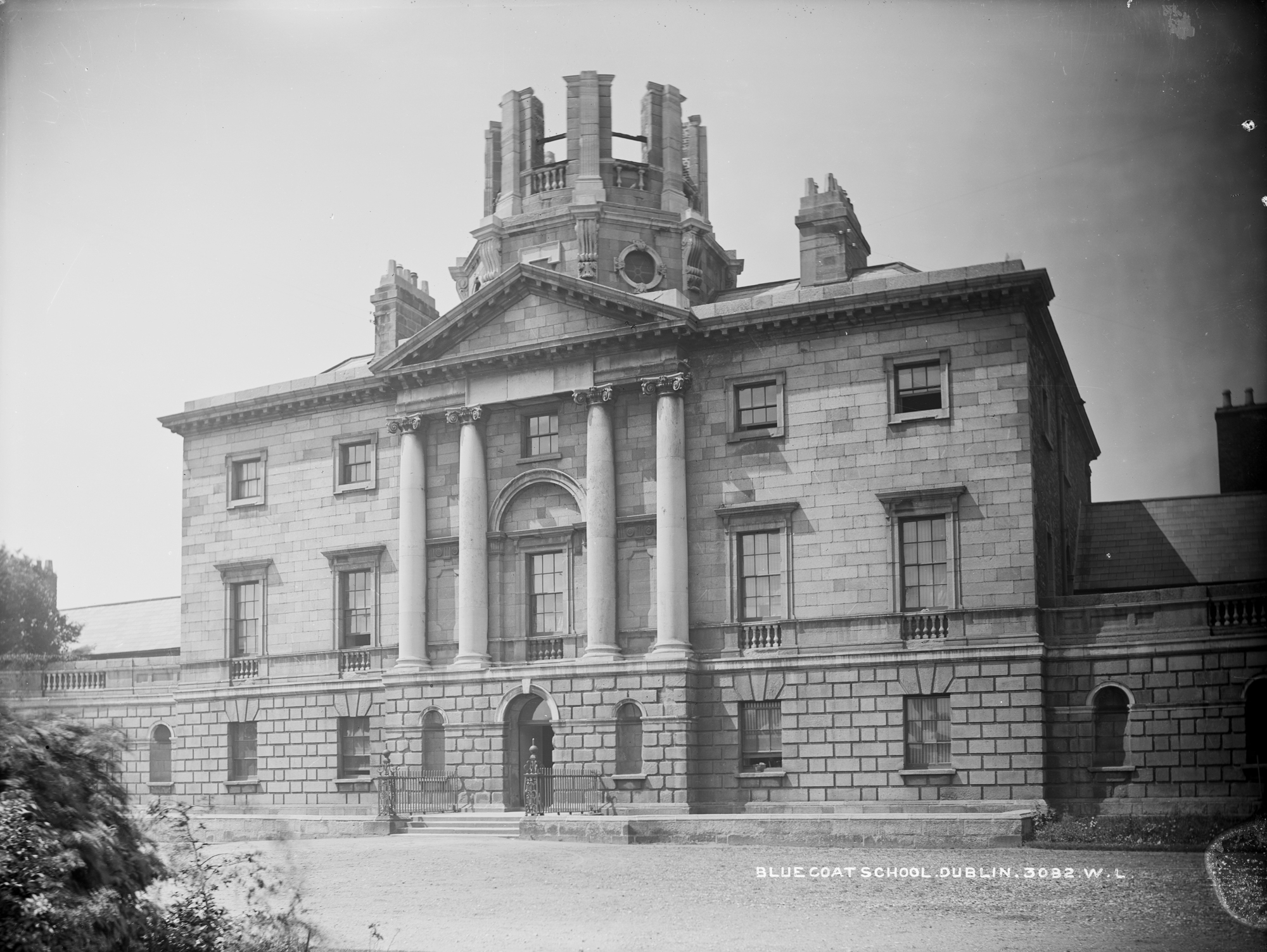
Blue Coat School, Dublin, by Thomas Ivory, photograph from the end of the nineteenth century, before the unfinished cupola had been demolished. The building now houses the Law Society of Ireland

Ivory designed Lord Newcomen's bank, built in 1781, at the corner of Castle Street and Cork Hill; it later became a public health office.

The Royal Hibernian Marine School, often attributed to him, was more probably the work of Thomas Cooley.

He made a drawing of the Casino at Marino, near Dublin, which was engraved by Edward Rooker.

In the board-room of the King's Hospital was a picture (assigned to 1775 and John Trotter said to represent Ivory and eight others sitting at or standing round a table on which are spread plans of the new building.

One of his few notable Cork buildings was the Bishop's Palace on Bishop Street from 1777.

He later designed the custom house at Coleraine, County Londonderry which was begun in 1783.

== Notes ==
Attribution

This article incorporates text from a publication now in the public domain: Lee, Sidney, ed. (1892). "Ivory, Thomas (d.1786)". Dictionary of National Biography. Vol. 29. London: Smith, Elder & Co.
