= Stefano Sanvito =

Italian Physicist

Professor Stefano Sanvito
- Born: Italy
- Education: University of Milan Lancaster University
- Awards: Fellow of the Institute of Physics (2013), Member of the Royal Irish Academy (2016), Knight of the Star of Italy (2016)
- Scientific career
- Fields: Physics, Computational Materials Science, Spintronics
- Workplaces: Trinity College Dublin
- Doctoral advisor: Colin J. Lambert, John J. Jefferson
- Website: spincomp.com

Stefano Sanvito is an Italian physicist and academic, currently the Chair of Condensed Matter Theory at Trinity College Dublin in Ireland. He is Director of the CRANN Institute and a principal investigator at AMBER Centre, where he leads the Computational Spintronics Group. Sanvito is one of the developers of Smeagol, a software for nanoscale device modeling. He has a h-index of 82 with over 32,000 citations.

== Education ==
Sanvito received his Laurea (BSc + MSc equivalent) in Theoretical Physics from the University of Milan in 1994. He completed his Ph.D. in Theoretical Physics at Lancaster University in 1999, under the supervision of Colin J. Lambert and John H. Jefferson.

== Career ==
Sanvito began his research career as a research assistant at the University of Milan and Pirelli Cavi. From 1999 to 2002, he was a postdoctoral research fellow at the University of California, Santa Barbara, where he worked on the theory of magnetic semiconductors.

In 2002, he joined Trinity College Dublin as a Lecturer in the School of Physics, becoming a full Professor in 2006 and subsequently appointed to the Chair of Condensed Matter Theory in 2012. During his time in Trinity College Dublin, he has also served as Dean of Graduate Studies (2005–2009), Deputy Director of CRANN (2009–2013), Director of AMBER Centre (2013–2015) and Director of CRANN (2013–present).

He has led the Computational Spintronics Group, focused on theoretical and computational studies of spin transport, magnetic materials, and device physics. Sanvito is a principal developer of Smeagol, a quantum transport code coupling density functional theory and non-equilibrium Green's functions, now used by over 200 research groups worldwide.

== Honors and awards ==
- 2006 – Elected Fellow of Trinity College Dublin
- 2013 – Elected Fellow of the Institute of Physics
- 2016 – Elected Member of the Royal Irish Academy
- 2016 – Awarded the Order of the Star of Italy
- 2020–2023 – Recognized as a Clarivate Highly Cited Researcher

== Selected publications ==
- Rocha, A. R., et al. "Towards molecular spintronics." Nature Materials 4.4 (2005): 335.
- Motta, C., et al. "Revealing the role of organic cations in hybrid halide perovskites." Nature Communications 6 (2015): 7026.
- Lunghi, A., et al. "The role of anharmonic phonons in spin relaxation." Nature Communications 8 (2017): 14620.
- Sanvito, S., et al. "Accelerated discovery of new magnets in the Heusler alloy family." Science Advances 3 (2017): e1602241.
