= Michael Coey =

Irish physicist (1945–2025)

- Born: 24 February 1945; Belfast, Northern Ireland
- Died: 6 October 2025 (aged 80)
- Education: Jesus College, Cambridge (BA); University of Manitoba (PhD)
- Known for: Amorphous magnetic phases
- Spouse: Wong May
- Awards: Gold Medal of the Royal Irish Academy
- Scientific career
- Fields: Magnetism, Spintronics, Magnetoelectrochemistry
- Workplaces: Trinity College, Dublin
- Thesis: Mössbauer Effect of ^{57}Fe in Magnetic Oxides (1971)
- Doctoral advisor: Allan H. Morrish

John Michael David Coey (24 February 1945 – 6 October 2025), known as Michael Coey, was a Northern Irish-born experimental physicist working in the fields of magnetism and spintronics. He was a professor at the Trinity College Dublin (TCD).

== Life and career ==
=== Education ===
Michael Coey completed a BA in Physics at Jesus College, Cambridge in 1966; he then travelled across Europe and Asia, teaching English and Physics in India. He completed his PhD from University of Manitoba (1971) for a thesis on "Mössbauer Effect of ^{57}Fe in Magnetic Oxides" with advisor Allan H. Morrish.

He was at the physics department of Trinity College Dublin (TCD) from 1978. He obtained his ScD in 1987 and passed his Habilitation from the University of Grenoble in 1986, and an honorary doctorate in 1994. He served as Erasmus Smith's Professor of Natural and Experimental Philosophy at TCD from 2007 to 2012. After retirement, he was an Emeritus professor at TCD.

=== Career ===
Coey was a Professor of Physics at TCD from 1987, and was appointed Erasmus Smith's Professor of Natural and Experimental Philosophy (2007–2012), a chair that dates from 1724.

In 1994 Coey founded Magnetic Solutions and went on to be the cofounder of CRANN Ireland's Nanoscience Research institute (2002) and conceived Dublin's unique Science Gallery (2006).

His textbook Magnetism and Magnetic Materials has been well received.

He delivered a public lecture on the History of Magnetism in Paris in 2010. He held positions at National University Singapore and the Max Planck Institute for Chemical Physics of Solids in Dresden. He also worked with Beihang University in Beijing for five years.

He was part of numerous collaborations including: IBM Yorktown Heights (1979), Institute of Physics Peking (1980), McGill University (1982), University of Bordeaux (1984), CEN-Grenoble (1985), Johns Hopkins APL (1986), Universite de Paris IV (1992), University of California, San Diego (1997), Florida State University (1998), University of Paris XI (1998), Leman University Geneva (2001/3), University of Strasbourg (2006).

Coey pioneered a co-operation project between academic and industrial laboratories in the Concerted European Action on Magnets (1985–95). Throughout his career he strongly identified himself with the European spirit and tradition of collaboration.

By 2009, he had published more than 600 articles and filed 25 patents. In late 2025, his H-index was 116.

=== Personal life and death ===
Coey was married to poet Wong May Coey in 1973 and had two sons.

Coey died on 6 October 2025, at the age of 80.

== Honours and awards ==
Coey was a member of the Royal Irish Academy (1987), a Fellow of the Royal Society (2003) and a Foreign Associate of the US National Academy of Sciences (2005). He was also a fellow of the Institute of Physics, the Mineralogical Society of America and the American Physical Society.

His numerous awards included a Fulbright Fellowship, the Charles Chree Medal of the Institute of Physics (1997), the Gold Medal of the Royal Irish Academy (2005) the RDS INTEL Prize Lecture on Nanoscience (2012) in addition to being the recipient of the Gutenberg (2015) and Max Born Medal and Prize (2019) awards. He also won the Humboldt Prize in 2013. He received the Max Born Medal and Prize from the Institute of Physics in 2012.

He received an honorary doctorate from the Institute National Polytechnique Grenoble (1994) and had been a Distinguished Lecturer, IEEE Magnetics Study (2006) and the Albert Einstein Professor of the Chinese Academy of Sciences (2010). In 2023, he was awarded an honorary D.Sc. by Trinity College Dublin.

In 2000, he was awarded funding from Science Foundation Ireland, which went towards the creation of the Centre for Research on Adaptive Nanostructures and Nanodevices at TCD.

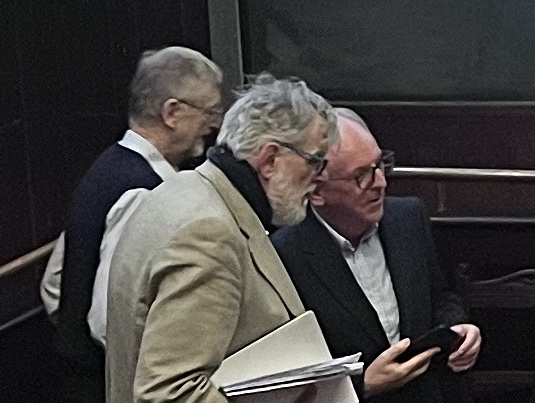
Professors Iggy McGovern, Mike Coey and John Donegan at the Physics 300 talks in Trinity College Dublin

== Books ==
- Magnetism and Magnetic Materials (Cambridge University Press, 2010)
- (with R. Skomski) Permanent Magnetism (IOP 1999)
- (with K Moorjani) Magnetic Glasses (Elsevier 1984)
- (edited) Rare Earth Iron Permanent Magnets (Oxford 1996)
- (edited) Concerted European Action on Magnets (Elsevier 1989)
- (edited) Structural and Magnetic Phase Transitions in Minerals (Springer 1988)
- (edited) Current Topics in Magnetism (CJP 1987)

== Sources ==
- Fox, A.M. (2011). "Magnetism and Magnetic Materials, by J.M.D. Coey". Contemporary Physics. 52 (1). Informa UK Limited: 83–84. doi:10.1080/00107514.2010.514061. ISSN 0010-7514. S2CID 118132280.
- Lifland, J. (27 May 2009). "Profile of John Michael David Coey". Proceedings of the National Academy of Sciences. 106 (22): 8808–8810. Bibcode:2009PNAS..106.8808L. doi:10.1073/pnas.0904444106. ISSN 0027-8424. PMC 2690015. PMID 19474296.
