= Newcomen Bank =

Georgian neo-classical building in Dublin, Ireland

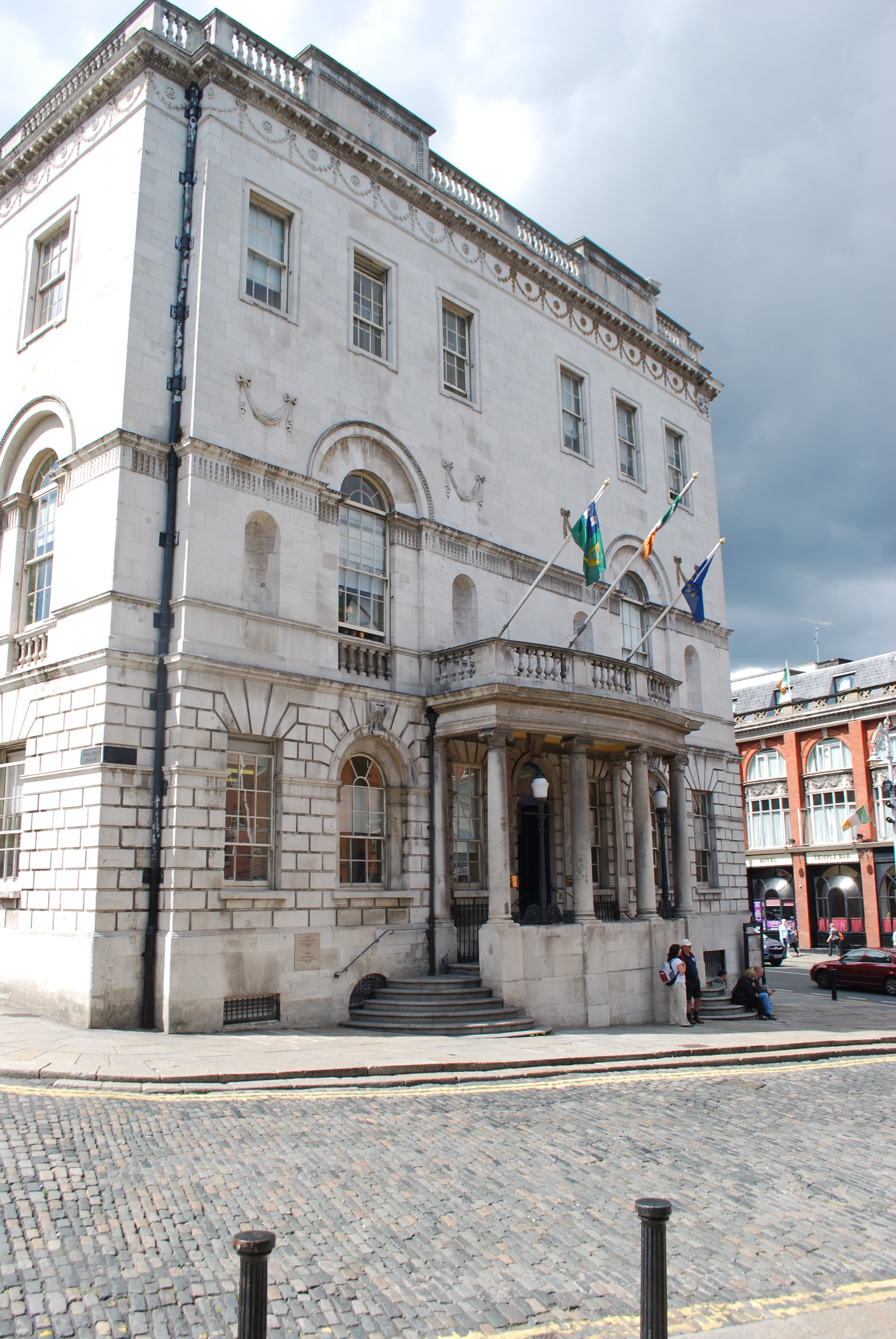
- Interactive map of the Newcomen Bank area

General information
- Status: Office
- Type: House
- Architectural style: Georgian; Neoclassical
- Location: Dublin, Ireland
- Coordinates: 53.3438702°N 6.2677291°W
- Estimated completion: 1781
- Owner: Dublin City Council

Technical details
- Material: Portland stone
- Floor count: 5 over basement

Design and construction
- Architects: Thomas Ivory and James Hoban (1781); William Caldbeck (1856-62)
- Developer: Sir William Gleadowe-Newcomen, 1st Baronet

Newcomen Bank is a former Georgian bank building and private residence on the junction of Cork Hill, Lord Edward Street and Castle Street, designed by architect Thomas Ivory in 1781 with the assistance of James Hoban.

The bank itself was usually referred to as Newcomen's bank, Newcomen bank or Gleadowe-Newcomen's bank.

The building was constructed and named for the Newcomen family.

== History ==
The banking business originated as Swift's bank at 17 Eustace Street (then number 22 Eustace Street), founded around 1722 by the merchant James Swift.

In 1742 the bank moved to Castle Street and by 1745 James Swift had died and the business was taken over by the new firm of Thomas Gleadowe & Company. In 1767, Thomas was succeeded by his son William Gleadowe. Five years later William had married an heiress, Charlotte Gleadowe-Newcomen, 1st Viscountess Newcomen and assumed the Newcomen name.

After the business collapsed in 1825, the building was later acquired by the Hibernian bank out of bankruptcy. The Hibernian bank had been founded in April 1825 as a response to anti catholic discrimination by the Bank of Ireland and had its first premises at 81 Marlborough Street before moving to the old Newcomen bank building in 1831. The Hibernian bank was itself later taken over by the Bank of Ireland in 1958.

=== 1820s Banking crash ===
By 1820, there were around 28 banks in Ireland. In May 1820 Stephen and James Roche's bank in Cork collapsed and this was followed soon after by Leslie and Company also in Cork. Over the following months and years there followed a generalised Irish banking crash and economic malaise which followed a deflationary period after the end of the Napoleonic wars.

Newcomen bank as well as several other banks in the city of Dublin such as Sir William Alexander's bank also collapsed in the 1820s. The Newcomen family and several other prominent families were financially ruined leading to Thomas Gleadowe-Newcomen, 2nd Viscount Newcomen shooting himself in his office either at the bank or at his residence at Killester House on 15 January 1825.

== Building ==
The building was constructed as a private residence in a neo-classical Georgian style in 1781 and faced in white portland stone. It was located opposite some of Dublin's most notable buildings including the Royal Exchange, Dublin Castle, La Touche Bank and Benjamin Burton's Bank (1700-33) in what was then a prestigious location.

Some of the interior stucco work was carried out by Vincent Waldré while the sculptor Simon Vierpyl carved the friezes and impost courses throughout the building.

Further works were later carried out by William Caldbeck at the bank between 1856-62 doubling the Cork Hill bowed frontage and adding an Ionic portico also in matching portland stone.

The northern end gable was added by Dublin Corporation architect Daniel J Freeman in 1884.

The bank was acquired by Dublin Corporation in 1886 and was later usually referred to as the rates office. It remained in use as the rates office until the early 2000s.

As of 2023, it is planned to restore the building for use as a multipurpose events and conferencing space.

== See also ==
- List of banks in the Republic of Ireland
