= James Hoban Jr. =

American lawyer (1808–1846)

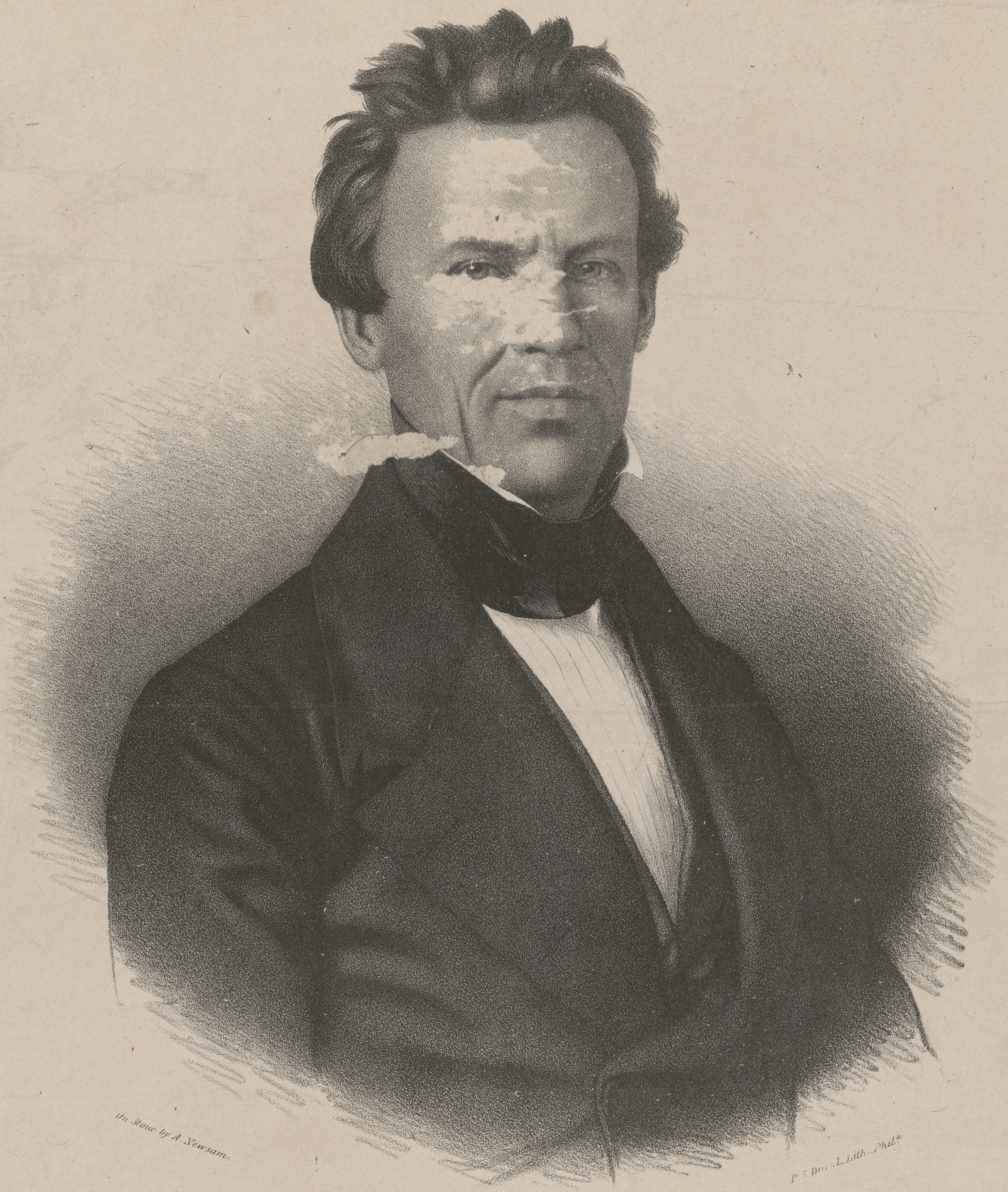
- 1846 lithograph of Hoban by Albert Newsam
- Born: 1808; U.S.
- Died: January 19, 1846 (aged 37–38); U.S.
- Occupation: Lawyer
- Spouse: Marion Blackwell French (m. 1831)
- Children: 6
- Father: James Hoban

Signature
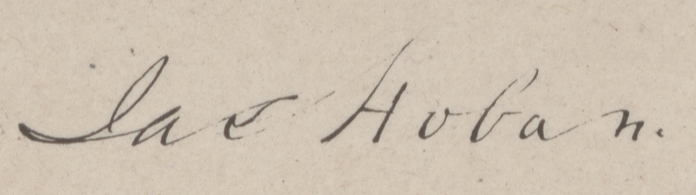

James Hoban Jr. (1808 – January 19, 1846) was an American lawyer who served as United States Attorney for the District of Columbia in the 1840s.

== Early life ==
James Hoban Jr. was born to James Hoban. His father was an Irish-American architect who designed the White House. Hoban was noted as looking very similar to his father.

== Career ==
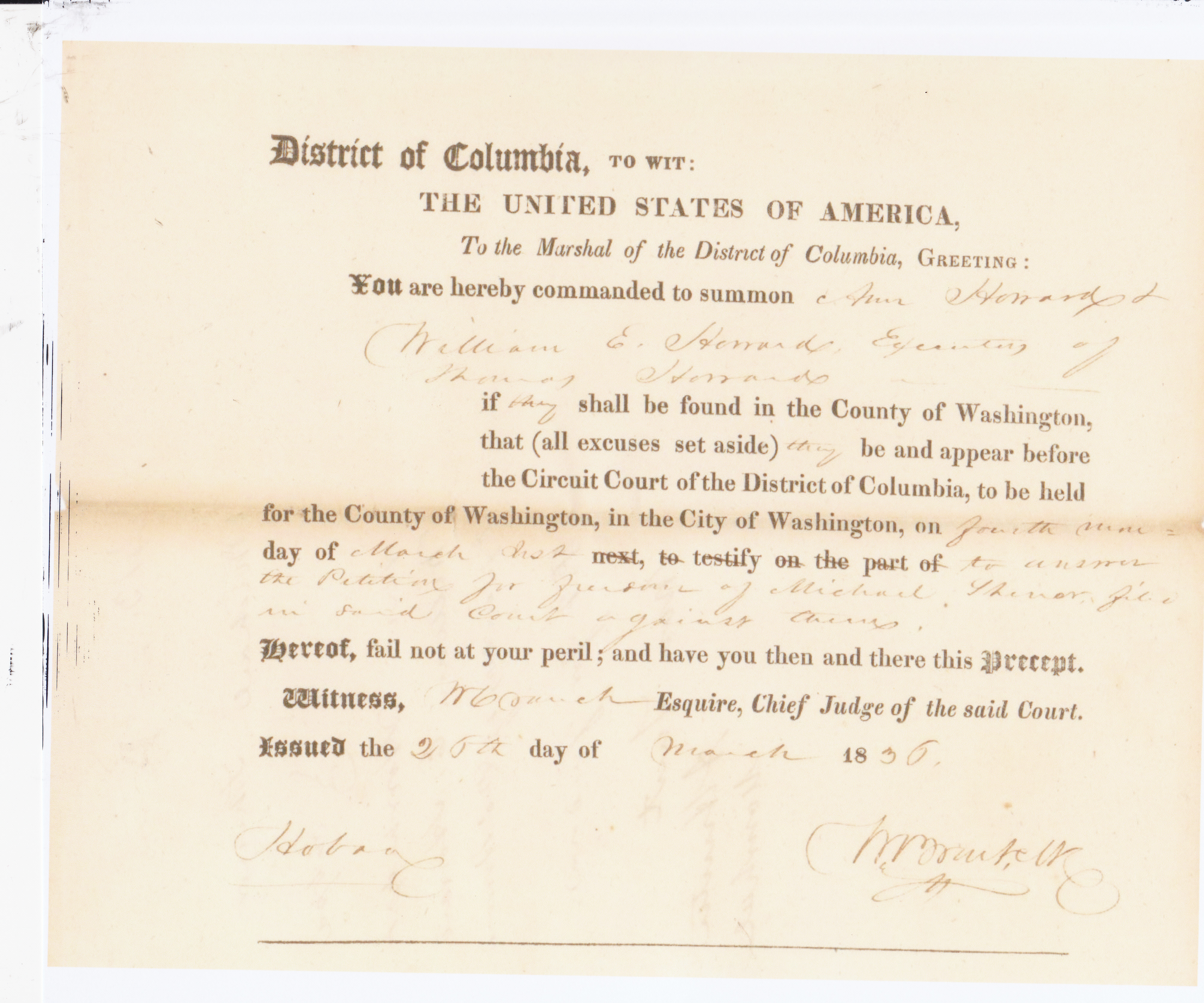
1836 freedom petition signed by Hoban for Michael Shiner

As a lawyer, Hoban helped a Washington, D.C., slave Michael Shiner obtain his freedom in a 1836 freedom petition. At the time of his death, Hoban was serving as the United States Attorney for the District of Columbia.

== Personal life ==
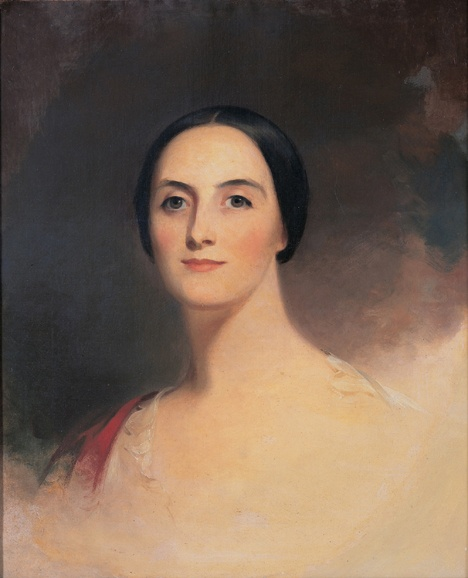
Purported portrait of Marion Blackwell French by Thomas Sully

Hoban married Marion Blackwell French (1813–1890) on November 22, 1831, in Washington, D.C. They had six children, Helen, Anna, Marion, James, Frederick and Lawrence.

Hoban died on January 19, 1846.
