= Amorphous magnet =

Type of magnetic order

Schematic representation of a crystalline ferromagnetic phase (top) and a disordered phase of an amorphous magnet (bottom)

In physics, amorphous magnet refers to a magnet made from amorphous solids. Below a certain temperature, these magnets present permanent magnetic phases produced by randomly located magnetic moments. Three common types of amorphous magnetic phases are asperomagnetism, speromagnetism and sperimagnetism, which correspond to ferromagnetism, antiferromagnetism and ferrimagnetism, respectively, of crystalline solids. Spin glass models can present these amorphous types of magnetism. Due to random frustration, amorphous magnets possess many nearly degenerate ground states.

The terms for the amorphous magnetic phases were coined by Michael Coey in 1970s. The Greek root spero/speri (Greek: διασπειρω, romanized: diaspeiro) means 'to scatter'. (Note: Sperimagnetism was coined in 1973 by Coey and P.W. Reinhard, but was later relabelled to speromagnetism.)

== Phases ==
=== Single species ===
==== Asperomagnetism ====
Asperomagnetism is the equivalent of ferromagnetism for a disordered system with random magnetic moments. It is defined by short range correlations of locked magnetic moments within small noncrystalline regions, with average long range correlations. Asperomagnets possess a permanent net magnetic moment.

An example of an asperomagnets is amorphous YFe_{3} and DyNi_{3}.

==== Speromagnetism ====
Speromagnetism is the equivalent of antiferromagnetism for a disordered system with random magnetic moments. It is defined by short range correlations of locked magnetic moments within small noncrystalline regions, without average long range correlations. Speromagnets do not have a net magnetic moment.

An example of a solid presenting speromagnetism is amorphous YFe_{2} and can be detected using Mössbauer spectroscopy.

=== Multiple species ===
==== Sperimagnetism ====
Sperimagnetism is the equivalent of ferrimagnetism for a disordered system with two or more species of magnetic moments, with at least one species locked in random magnetic moments. Sperimagnets possess a permanent net magnetic moment. When all species are the same, this phase is equivalent to asperomagnetism.
