= Blackhall Place =

Street in Dublin, Ireland

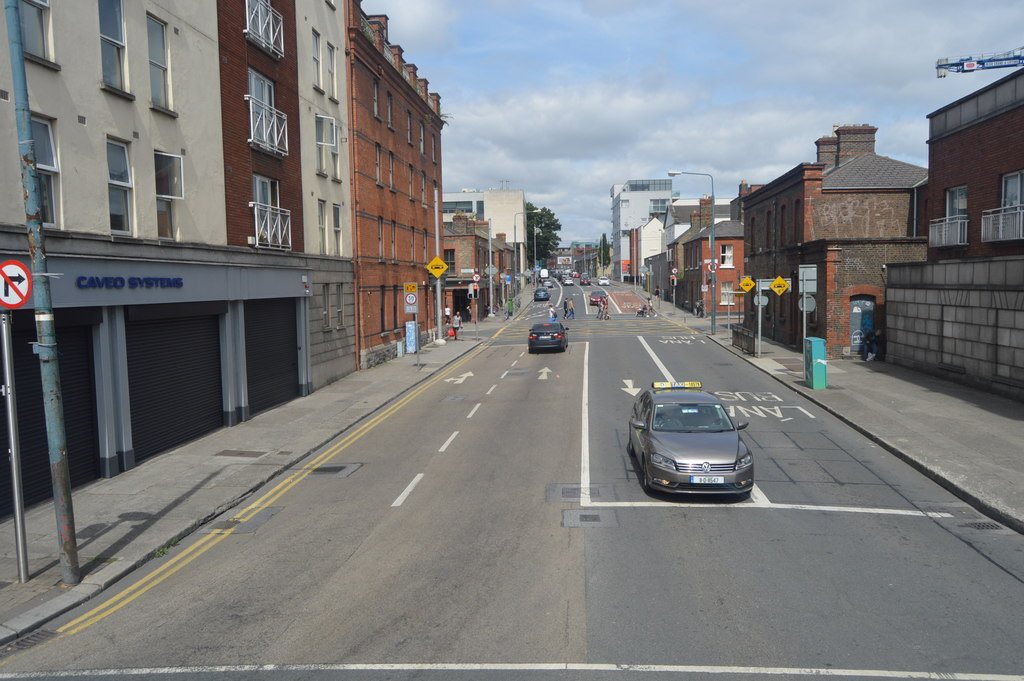
- Blackhall Place
- Native name: Plás Blackhall (Irish)
- Namesake: Sir Thomas Blackhall
- Location: Dublin, Ireland
- Postal code: D07
- north end: Stoneybatter
- south end: James Joyce Bridge

Blackhall Place (Irish: Plás Blackhall) is a street in Dublin, Ireland which was laid out in the 1780s on the area which previously formed Oxmantown green.

It runs from Stoneybatter in the north to the River Liffey and the James Joyce Bridge.

== History ==
Blackhall Place, along with the adjoining Blackhall Parade, Blackhall Street, Blackhall Green, and Blackhall Row in Dublin 7 are all named for Sir Thomas Blackhall, a former Lord Mayor of Dublin in 1769-70 and governor of the Blue Coat School at the time of the new building's construction. Blackhall Place first appears on maps in 1822 while earlier Blackhall Street appears from 1789 and Blackhall market and row from 1787. It broadly follows the plan for the area surrounding the school first set out by Thomas Ivory in 1775 and continued after his death in 1786. The main school building has been occupied by the Law Society of Ireland since the 1970s after being vacated by the school in 1969.

Much of the area around the street was originally occupied by the nearby St. Paul's Church and churchyard from around 1700 onwards.

The original street did not meet the river, and was extended to meet Benburb Street in 1886.

Most of the original Georgian houses have been demolished, with a small number of surviving examples. On the corner of Blackhall Place and Hendrick Street, there is a former Methodist chapel, known as the Gravel Walk Methodist Church. This was rebuilt in 1841.

The area around Blackhall Place, and the construction of the James Joyce Bridge was part of the 1996 Historic Area Rejuvenation Project.

== Housing scheme ==
In the late 19th century, the Dublin City Council developed a plot to create a new street as well as renovating existing tenements located in Blackhall Place. This plot involved the local finance and leases committee selling the property to the Artisans' Dwellings Committee. The site in question was Blackhall Place, Blackhall Street, Blackhall Parade and North King Street.

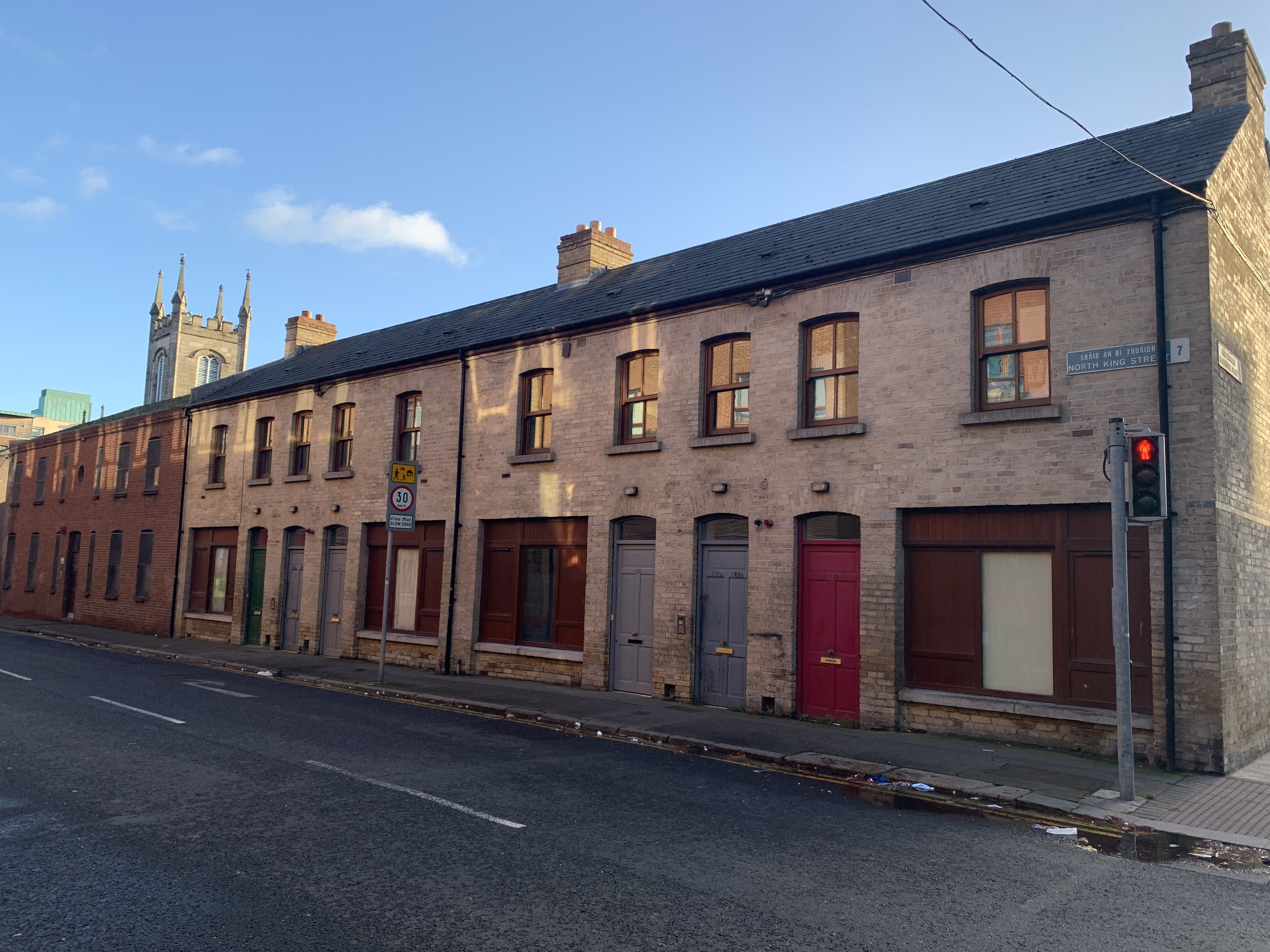
Housing in North King Street

The plan created was to build 59 new houses with some being multiple occupancy. These houses would be divided up into four different classes from A-D. Class A would have 8 houses, class B to have 6 houses, C to have 15 and class D were to have 30 houses. On top of this, a newly developed road was to be built where 29 two-storey tenements containing four dwellings each were to be built for the A class residents. The cost to rent a ground floor tenement was 3s. 6d. per week. These ground floor tenements had a garden which was 19x17 feet. The upper floor of these tenements would cost 2s. 6d. per week to rent, with each tenement having a toilet. The Artisans Dwelling Company had also planned for 5 two-storey houses looking onto North King Street. The ground floor would be occupied with shops as well as a coal bunker, meat safe and a yard available to rent for 6s. 6d per week for Class B residents. Class C would have the availability to rent 15 two-storey houses in single occupancy in Blackhall Place including 2 bedrooms and a yard which could be rented for 7s. 6d. per week. 8 one-storey occupancy houses were wished to be built by the Corporation for Class D with the rent being 4s. 6d. per week. The Class E dwellings were different to the other dwellings as it was proposed to renovate existing houses on Blackhall Street with five tenements per house with the rent being varied for the upper and ground floors.

=== Criticism ===
==== Sir Charles Cameron ====
Sir Charles Cameron, the Superintendent Medical Officer for Health at this time clearly voiced his views which were reported in Report 102/1891. He believed that the rent costs for these dwellings were too much for the residents and the local people who needed these dwellings for a place to live. He believed that the rent for all these locations should not exceed 3s. 6d. per week. He also thought that the corporation should revert to using single family homes instead of being renovated. Cameron's opinion carried huge weight and the corporation held him and his opinion in high esteem. This was evident as the Treasury decided to lower the rent depending on the category of class assigned.

==== Spencer Harty ====
The City Surveyor during this time was Spencer Harty. He spoke out to the fact of the rent being so high, describing how he deliberately chose to put the rents this high as Blackhall Place was a respectable area. The Corporation provided an insight into the employments of the residents living in these dwellings. These jobs were not seen as being ones which would employ a 'working class artisan', such as cooper, carpenter, tailor and a police constable.

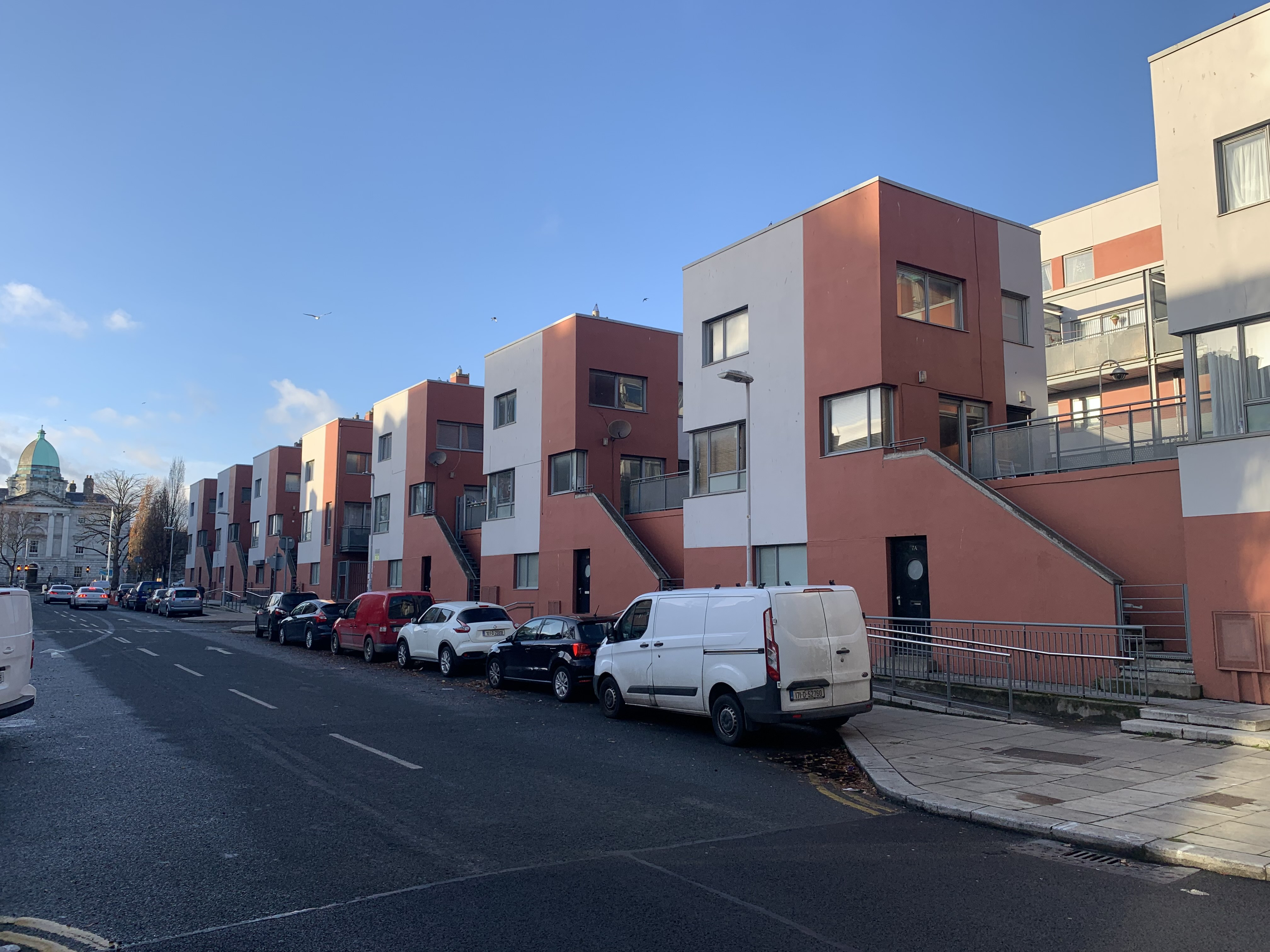
Redevelopment of Blackhall Street

=== Architecture ===
Due to Spencer Harty's concern to build respectable houses in the area, the council then decided to build in brick rather than in breeze concrete, even though the concrete was cheaper to buy. They also used the old bricks from the demolished buildings for use in the reconstruction of these new dwellings. Blackhall Place was then officially opened on 3 October 1896. Speeches were made where a common theme was that each family should have a house to their own.

=== Modern redevelopment ===
Blackhall Place and some surrounding areas have been redeveloped on a number of occasions since its development. Some redesigning, including block flats, has been a common occurrence in its redevelopment however the street frontages have mainly survived throughout the past decades and are still good examples of single occupancy housing as well as the shops with flats.

== Modern housing ==
=== Social housing ===
In 2021, the developer Bartra built a seven-storey block with 23 apartments on a derelict site in Blackhall Place. For the next 25 years, the company has agreed to lease the entire building to Dublin City Council who intend to use it as social housing at a cost of €500,000. Under the long-term leasing scheme, local authorities pay between 82% and 95% of the market rent.

=== Student housing ===
In 2016, with Blackhall Place being located near Dublin Institute of Technology's (now TU Dublin) campus in Grangegorman, student accommodation including office blocks was amongst buildings for sale in Blackhall Place. As of 2021, these are available to rent as a student starting from €220 a week.
