= Wong May =

Chinese poet (born 1944)

Wong May (born 1944) is a poet who was born in China, grew up in Singapore, and now lives in Ireland. She won the Windham-Campbell Literature Prize for poetry in 2022.

== Early life and education ==
Wong was born in Chongqing, China in 1944 and moved to Singapore with her mother in 1950. Her mother, Wang Mei-Chuang, was a classical Chinese poet who taught history and Chinese literature. Wong May received her Bachelor of Arts degree in English Literature, from the University of Singapore in 1965. She used to be Singaporean, but had to relinquish her citizenship after Singapore stopped allowing dual citizenship. Wong May has described the relinquishing of her Singapore citizenship as "a severance which still pains me".

In 1966, she went to the Iowa Writers' Workshop where she received her Master of Fine Arts degree from the University of Iowa in 1968.

== Career ==
Wong's first book of poetry, A Bad Girl's Book of Animals, was published by Harcourt, Brace and Jovanovich in 1969. While at MacDowell Colony in 1969, Wong May met Hilda Morley. Stylistically their poetry is closely associated.

Wong May's next book, Reports, published by Harcourt Brace Jovanovich, came out in 1972. Her Wannsee Poems, written during a DAAD (German Academic Exchange Service) fellowship in Berlin, were translated as Wannsee Gedichte by Nicolas Born. In 1978 she published a collection of poetry called Superstitions. In 2014 Picasso's Tears, her fourth book of poems including work from 1978–2013, was published by Octopus Books.

In the Same Light: 200 Tang Poems for Our Century appeared in 2022 with UK publisher Carcanet and US publisher The Song Cave. This is a collection of Tang dynasty poems translated from the Chinese, in Wong's distinctive poetic voice and style. The 'Afterword' to the book is a poetic-prose meditation on Tang poetry, its historical background and its translation, and more besides. The book was awarded one of the US Windham–Campbell Literature Prizes for 2022. It was also the UK's Poetry Book Society Spring 2022 Translation Choice.

== Personal life ==
Wong lives in Dublin, where she writes poetry and paints. She has stated a preference to describe herself as a "cultural worker" who writes poetry and paints, rather than a poet.

In 1973, Wong May married Michael Coey, Professor of Physics at Trinity College in Dublin, Ireland and they had two sons. Michael died on 6 October 2025.

== Selected publications ==
=== Poetry ===
- A Bad Girl's Book of Animals (1969)
- Reports (1972)
- Wannsee-Gedichte (1975)
- Superstitions (1978)
- Picasso's Tears (2014)

=== Translations ===
- In the Same Light: 200 Tang Poems for Our Century (2014)
