= John Donegan =

Irish physicist (born 1960)

- Born: 1960 (age 65–66); Castlebar, County Mayo, Ireland
- Education: University College Galway (now University of Galway)
- Known for: Photonics, Optical Communications, Nanophotonics
- Scientific career
- Fields: Physics, Photonics, Nanophotonics
- Workplaces: Trinity College Dublin
- Doctoral advisor: G.F. Imbusch

John Donegan is an Irish physicist and academic specializing in photonics, nanophotonics, and optical communications. He is the Professor of Physics and Applications of Light at Trinity College Dublin and Deputy Director of the CRANN Nanoscience Research Centre having previously served as Head of the School of Physics at Trinity. A Fellow of Trinity College and the Institute of Physics, he has contributed to research and industry collaboration in optical and photonic sciences in Ireland and internationally.

== Education ==
Donegan received his B.Sc. in Physics (First Class Honours) in 1982 from the University College Galway (now University of Galway). He went on to complete his M.Sc. in Physics in 1984 and his Ph.D. in Physics in 1986 at the same institution. His doctoral research was supervised by Professor G.F. Imbusch. In 1997, he was awarded an M.A. (j.o.) from the University of Dublin, Trinity College.

== Career ==
Following his doctoral studies, Donegan undertook postdoctoral research at Lehigh University, Bethlehem, Pennsylvania, USA (1986–1988), working in the Sherman Fairchild Laboratory. He then held a further postdoctoral position at the Max-Planck-Institut für Festkörperforschung, Stuttgart, Germany (1988–1989).

In 1989, he returned to Ireland and joined Optronics Ireland, a newly established research centre at Trinity College Dublin, where he worked as a Senior Research Officer until 1993 under the direction of John Hegarty.

He joined the Department of Physics at Trinity College Dublin in 1993 as a Lecturer (Assistant Professor equivalent), and progressed through the ranks from Senior Lecturer to Professor of Physics and Applications of Light in 2018. Throughout his time at Trinity College Dublin, Donegan served as the Head of School of Physics, Trinity College Dublin (2008 – 2010), Deputy Head of School (2010 - present), Director of Research, School of Physics: (2005–2008), Chairman, Personnel and Appointments Committee, (2007–2008), Board Member, Trinity College Fellows Constituency (2007–2008) and as Course Director, Physics and Chemistry of Advanced Materials (1999–2002). Donegan is an investigator at both AMBER and CONNECT. He has led academic–industry research collaborations, particularly through AMBER, working with companies such as Western Digital, Nokia Bell Labs, and Pilot Photonics.

== Research and contributions ==
Donegan co-authored a paper in Science Advances that demonstrated a previously unknown form of light. Through a combination of theory and experiment, the study revealed that in reduced dimensions, photons can possess half-integer total angular momentum.

He has also made contributions to research on 2D materials. Donegan was part of the collaborative team that demonstrated Liquid Phase Exfoliation, a useful method for large-scale production of 2D materials. The resulting paper, published in Science, has been cited over 7,000 times. His work was part of two papers in Nature Communications that quantified both light scattering in 2D sheets and use optical effects to estimate sheet size.
