= Grainne Clancy =

Irish cricketer

Personal information
- Full name: Grainne Mary Clancy
- Born: 29 April 1961 (age 65); County Donegal, Ireland
- Batting: Right-handed
- Bowling: Right-arm medium

International information
- National side: Ireland (1983–1988)
- ODI debut (cap 3): 28 June 1987 v Australia
- Last ODI: 17 December 1988 v New Zealand
- Source: CricketArchive, 1 September 2016

Grainne Mary Clancy (born 29 April 1961) is a former Irish international cricketer who represented the Irish national team between 1983 and 1988. She played as a right-arm medium-pace bowler.

Clancy was born in County Donegal, but educated at the King's Hospital School in Dublin. She made her international debut for Ireland at the 1983 Centenary Tournament in the Netherlands. In late 1985, Clancy was selected for a tour of the West Indies. In one match against Trinidad and Tobago she dismissed two former West Indies internationals, Jasmine Sammy and Louise Browne, finishing with figures of 2/20 from seven overs. Clancy's One Day International (ODI) debut came against Australia in June 1987, in Ireland's first ODI series. The following year, she was selected in the Irish squad for the 1988 World Cup in Australia, which was to be her last international tournament. She appeared in all nine of her team's matches and took five wickets, with a best of 2/40 against the Netherlands.
