= John Pethica =

British physicist

Sir John Pethica FRS FREng

Chief Scientific Adviser, National Physical Laboratory
- In office 2007–2017

SFI Research Professor and Professor of Physics, Trinity College, Dublin
- In office 2001–2018

Professor of Materials Science, University of Oxford
- In office 1996–2001

Personal details
- Born: John Bernard Pethica; 1953 (age 72–73)

Sir John Bernard Pethica (born 1953) is a British chemist and Science Foundation Ireland (S.F.I.) professor of material science at Trinity College, Dublin, Chief Scientific Advisor at the UK's National Physical Laboratory, and a visiting professor at Oxford University. Pethica is most noted for his work on the development of nanoindentation and atom resolution atomic force microscopy.

== Education ==
John Pethica was a pupil at St Ambrose College in Hale Barns, Trafford, Manchester. He studied natural sciences (physics) at Trinity Hall, Cambridge, graduating with a B.A and a Ph.D. from the University of Cambridge during the late 1970s.

== Career ==
Pethica was a scientist employed at Brown, Boveri & Cie in Switzerland from 1980 to 1982. After this he held the position of Fellow at the University of Cambridge from 1983 to 1987. He became a lecturer at The University of Oxford in 1996, subsequently assuming the role of Professor of Materials Science.

In 2001, Pethica was one of the first ten people awarded an S.F.I. principal investigator award. Following the award, he transferred his activities from Oxford to Dublin, becoming an SFI Research Professor in Trinity College Dublin.

In February 2005, it was announced that Pethica will be the director of the Naughton Institute which will house CRANN, a new purpose built nanotechnology centre in Trinity College Dublin.

In October 2007, Pethica was made the Chief Scientific Advisor at the UK's National Physical Laboratory, the UK's National Measurement Institute.

== Honours and awards ==
In 1999, Pethica was elected a Fellow of the Royal Society (FRS). He has also served as Vice-President and Physical Secretary of the Royal Society. He was elected a Fellow of the Royal Academy of Engineering (FREng) in 2013. He was elected an honorary fellow of both Trinity College Dublin (in 2011) and St Cross College, Oxford (in 2014).

Pethica was awarded the Rosenhain Medal & Prize from the Institute of Materials, Minerals and Mining in 1997. He was the 2001 recipient of the Hughes Medal of the Royal Society of London, and the 2002 recipient of the Holweck Prize from the Institute of Physics.

Pethica was knighted in the 2014 Birthday Honours for services to science.

== Personal life ==
Pethica is a musician – playing violin and other instruments – with a particular interest in Irish and British folk music.
