= CRANN =

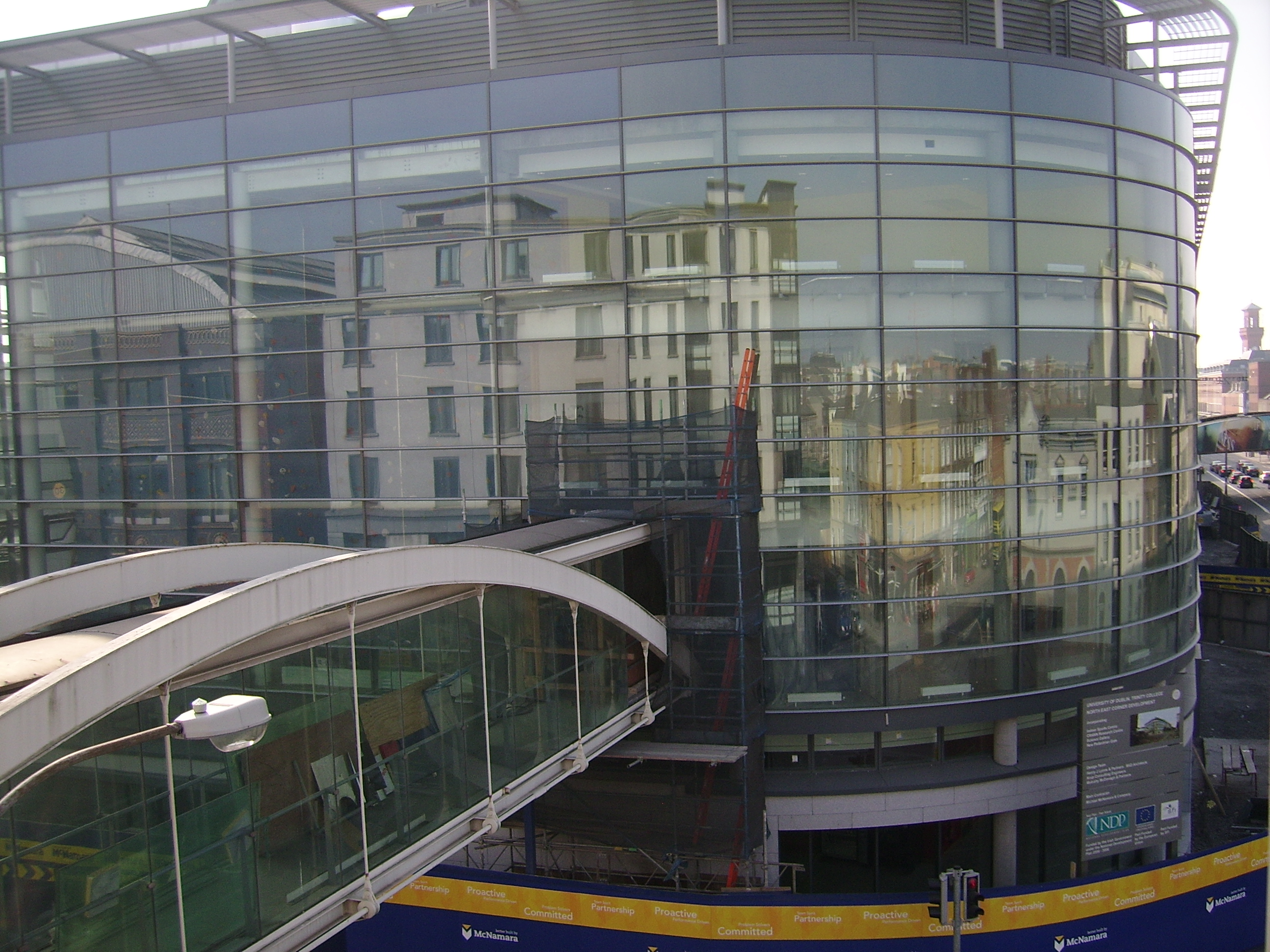
Trinity Sports Centre and CRANN complex

CRANN, the Centre for Research on Adaptive Nanostructures and Nanodevices, is Ireland's first purpose-built research institute whose purpose is to perform nanoscience research. It is housed in the Naughton Institute on the campus of Trinity College Dublin. Crann is the Irish word for tree.

The three major research areas are Nano-Biology of Cell Surface Interactions, Bottom-Up Fabrication and Testing of Nanoscale Integrated Devices, and Magnetic Nano-Structures and Devices. It also carries out outreach to local schools.

As of late 2025, CRANN was led by its director, Prof. Stefano Sanvito, along with deputy director Prof. John Donegan, and executive director Dr. Lorraine Byrne.

The research teams are led by principal investigators from Trinity College and University College Cork. Previous investigators included Professors Michael Coey, John Boland, John Pethica and Igor Shvets.
