= Igor Shvets =

Irish physicist

Professor Igor Shvets
- Education: Moscow Institute of Physics and Technology
- Awards: Trinity Academic Entrepreneur of the Year (2006), Enterprise Ireland Best in Category (2009)
- Scientific career
- Fields: Applied Physics, Nanoscience, Energy Materials
- Workplaces: Trinity College Dublin

Igor Shvets is the Head of Applied Physics at the School of Physics, Trinity College Dublin (TCD), where he is also a principal investigator at CRANN and AMBER. He has worked in nanomaterials, thin-film physics, energy systems, and transparent conducting oxides, and has founded technology spinouts in Ireland.

== Education ==
Shvets received his MSc in Physics and Electronics from the Moscow Institute of Physics and Technology (MIPT) in 1986, studying under Nobel Laureate Alexander Prokhorov. He earned his Ph.D. in Physics from MIPT and the General Physics Institute of the USSR Academy of Sciences in 1989.

== Career ==
Shvets began his academic career as a researcher at the General Physics Institute in Moscow (1989–1990), followed by a secondment to the University of Basel in Switzerland (1991–1992). In 1991, he joined Trinity College Dublin as a lecturer and was promoted to Associate Professor in 2001. He has been Head of Applied Physics since 2007.

From 2014 to 2020, he served as Head of the School of Physics at TCD. During his tenure, new MSc programs in Energy Science and Quantum Technologies were developed. He was also involved in establishing the €150 million CRANN research centre in 2002 and launched the weekend science initiative The Walton Club in 2014 alongside Arlene O'Neill

Shvets has founded three high-technology spin-out companies based on his research: Deerac Fluidics (2000–2008), later acquired by Labcyte, Cellix Ltd. (2008–2023), acquired by Randox Laboratories and Miravex Ltd. (2011–present), focused on dermatological imaging.

In 2009, he launched the Spirit of Ireland Project, a national initiative aimed at energy independence through pumped hydro storage.

== Research ==
Shvets specializes in the study and fabrication of heteroepitaxial thin films, oxide materials, and energy-conversion devices. He has published over 330 peer-reviewed papers and holds 27 patents.

In 2024, his group published a paper in Nature Communications describing a miniaturized spectrometer based on a single SnS₂/ReSe₂ van der Waals heterostructure, capable of photodetection, spectrum reconstruction, spectral imaging, long-term image memory, and signal processing within a single chip. He has also played a role in the development of Liquid Phase Exfoliation, a technique for scalable production of two-dimensional materials. This research, published in Science, has been cited over 7,000 times.

Shvets has contributed to the design of energy materials, co-authoring a 2022 Nature Communications paper on 4D-printed MXene hydrogels for high-efficiency pseudocapacitive energy storage. In magnetism and spintronics, he has co-authored studies on nanodomain-boundary-induced magnetoresistance in graphene, and on electric-field-induced phase transitions in magnetite nanostructures.
