= Hilda Morley =

American poet (1916–1998)

Hilda Morley circa 1990

Hilda Morley (September 19, 1916 – March 23, 1998) was an American poet associated with the Black Mountain movement.

== Early life and education ==
She was born Hilda Auerbach in New York City to Russian parents. Her father, Rachmiel Auerbach, was a doctor, and her mother, Sonia Lubove Kamenetsky, was a feminist and Labor Zionist. Her mother was born in Baku, and her father, born in Riga, was descended from Hasidic rabbis. She was a cousin of Isaiah Berlin through her father. As a child she wrote amazingly precocious work, and corresponded with William Butler Yeats. At the age of fifteen she moved to Haifa, Palestine, with her mother, and later to London to study at the University of London.

She was briefly married during her time in London, and divorced. She met and corresponded later with the poet H.D., who would influence her work. At their first meeting Hilda Morley questioned H.D. about her friendship with D. H. Lawrence and H.D. said, "You make me feel so historical."

== Career ==
When the Blitz began in London she moved back to the United States. In 1945, she married the painter Eugene Morley. They divorced in 1949, but his connection to abstract expressionism and to the New York School of painting was a lasting influence on her poetry. She wrote major poems that are inspired by individual works of visual art. Through Eugene Morley she became friends with Jackson Pollock, Franz Kline, David Smith, Mark Rothko and Willem de Kooning and Elaine de Kooning. Philip Guston would watch her from his studio window, and declared that she was his muse.

In 1952, she married the German composer, Stefan Wolpe, who through Morley was introduced to the abstract expressionist art scene. Wolpe taught at Black Mountain College, where Morley taught as well. Morley maintained that the atmosphere at Black Mountain was not favorable to women, although she enjoyed her time there. At Black Mountain, Wolpe and Morley became close friends with John Cage, David Tudor, Merce Cunningham, Dorothea Rockburne and Robert Rauschenberg, in addition to poets Charles Olson and Robert Creeley. Wolpe and Morley traveled widely in Europe as Wolpe taught at Darmstadt and had a residency in Rome. Wolpe developed Parkinson's disease in 1964, and Morley's life was greatly affected by her need to care for him until his death in 1972. Morley's understanding of her own art was greatly influenced by her life with Wolpe and he and his music are a major theme of her work.

The influence on the open construction of the poetry of Hilda Morley was not Charles Olson, but Wong May. Wong May was a young poet originally from China via Singapore. Wong May met Hilda Morley at the MacDowell Colony in New Hampshire during a residency there in 1969. She persuaded Morley to change her poetry using spacing and breaks for expressive effect. Morley revised her earlier poetry as well, using open construction. Morley wrote, “The poem of organic form molds its phrasing and spacing to conform to the pressures of the poetic content.”

It was not until 1976 (at the age of 60) that her first collection, A Blessing Outside Us, was published through the efforts of Denise Levertov. Levertov and Morley became friends in the late 1950s, and they had an extensive correspondence. Morley greatly respected Levertov as a poet, and valued her advice.

Levertov wrote on Morley, “The lucid, the illuminated quality of poem after poem is given them by the precision of their structure…the sum of the parts is, as in all the open ‘secrets’ of nature and of art, beyond accounting: the duende is dark within transparence.” Morley had five volumes of poetry published within her lifetime, and another after her death. Her poetry is involved with life and living, as well as a powerful collection dealing with the death and mourning of Wolpe, "What Are Winds and What Are Waters". Morley's work has been compared to Ezra Pound and T. S. Eliot, and it has won critical praise and numerous prizes.

== Reception ==
Part of the force of Morley's willing to explore the possibility of her medium. In her work, It serves as a personal means of expression. In writing on Morley's long poem “The Shutter Clangs”, Stanley Kunitz comments, “In the poem from which the passage is taken she meditates on John Donne's ‘Goodfriday, Riding Westward' and mounts on that meditation an oceanic spate of images pertaining to the death of her beloved – a montage with a span of three centuries, so rich and eloquent, even in its extravagance, that it constitutes an ambitious work. It is a vehicle that threatens on almost every page to fall apart, but in the end, out of the ‘clair bones’ and the dark years, the imagination seems to spread its sails and fly, ever westward, to the open water.”

Hayden Carruth has written of Morley's work, "How simple the language is, not a rhetorical gesture, not an unnecessary adjective, yet heightened by interweaving lines, cadences, and tones, by urgency of feeling and fineness of perception. We have these expressive works, indispensable to what we call American literature.”

"Morley manages to speak clearly and sparely of what is least sayable: the sense that we inhabit a living web, not as separate beings but as molecules of a larger and elastic whole," wrote Geoffrey O'Brien in The Village Voice.

== Later life and death ==
After living in New York for three decades Morley moved to Sag Harbor on Long Island for most of her last decade. In 1997, she returned to London, which had been a longtime wish, where she died on March 23, 1998, after a fall.

== Publications ==
=== Poetry ===
- A Blessing Outside Us (1976)
- To Hold in my Hand (1983)
- What Are Winds and What Are Waters (1983)
- Cloudless at First (1988)
- Between the Rocks (1992)
- The Turning (1998)
