= James Hoban =

Irish-American architect (1755–1831)

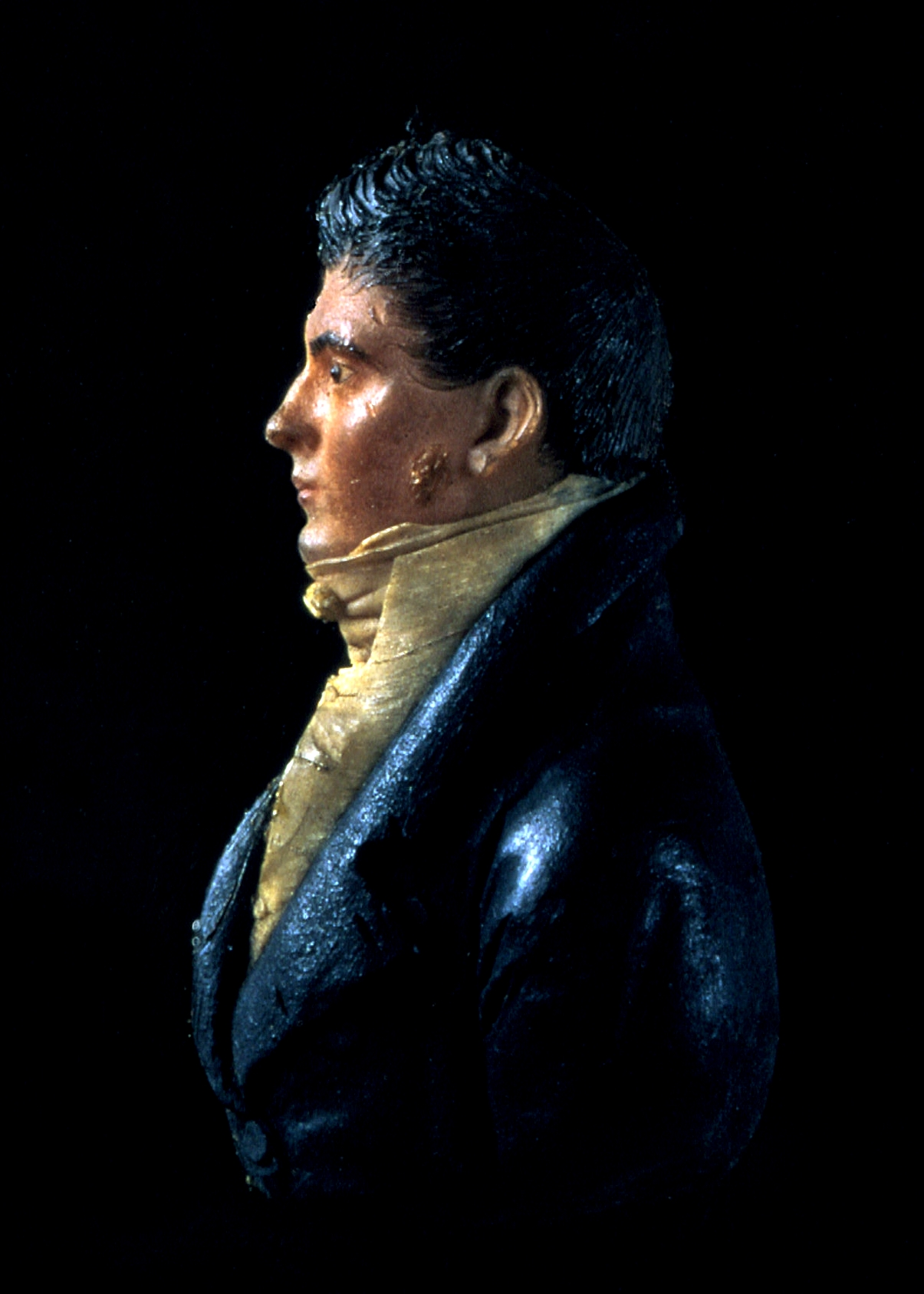
- Waxen bas-relief on glass of Hoban, c. 1800
- Born: 1755; Callan, County Kilkenny, Ireland
- Died: December 8, 1831 (aged 75–76); Washington, D.C., U.S.
- Education: Royal Dublin Society School of Drawing in Architecture (later the National College of Art and Design)
- Occupation: Architect
- Spouse: Susanna Sewall
- Children: James Hoban Jr.
- Buildings: The White House; Newcomen Bank; Charleston County Courthouse

James Hoban (1755 – December 8, 1831) was an Irish-American architect, best known for designing the White House in Washington D.C.

== Early life and education ==
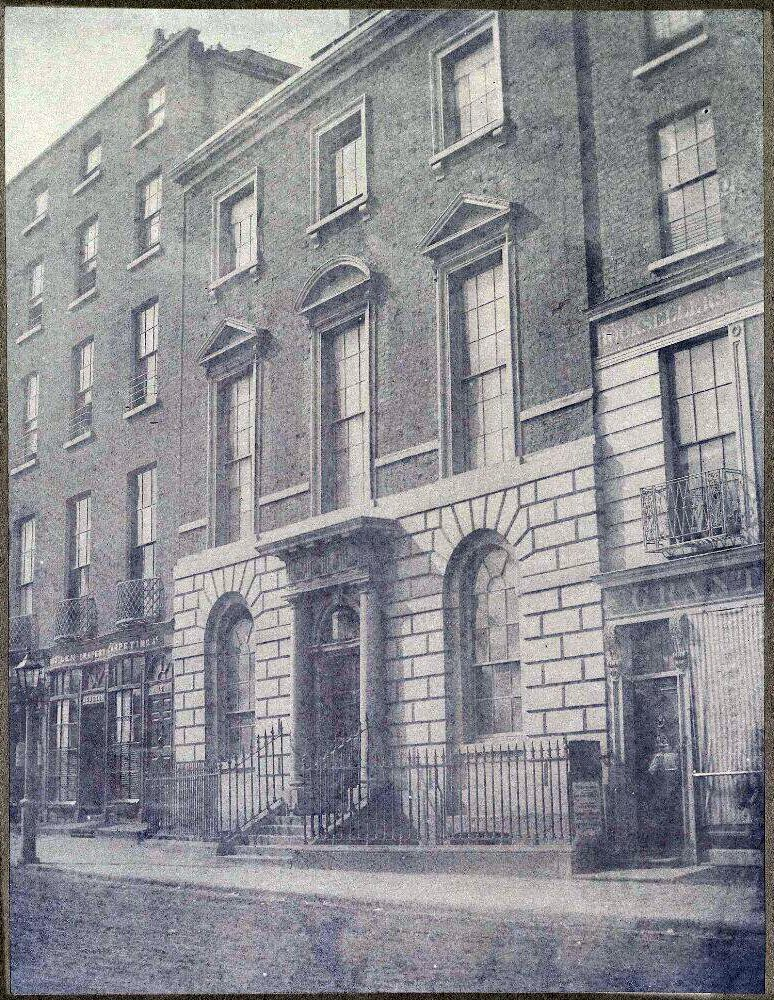
Dublin Society offices and studios at 112 Grafton Street, where Hoban learned draughtsmanship.

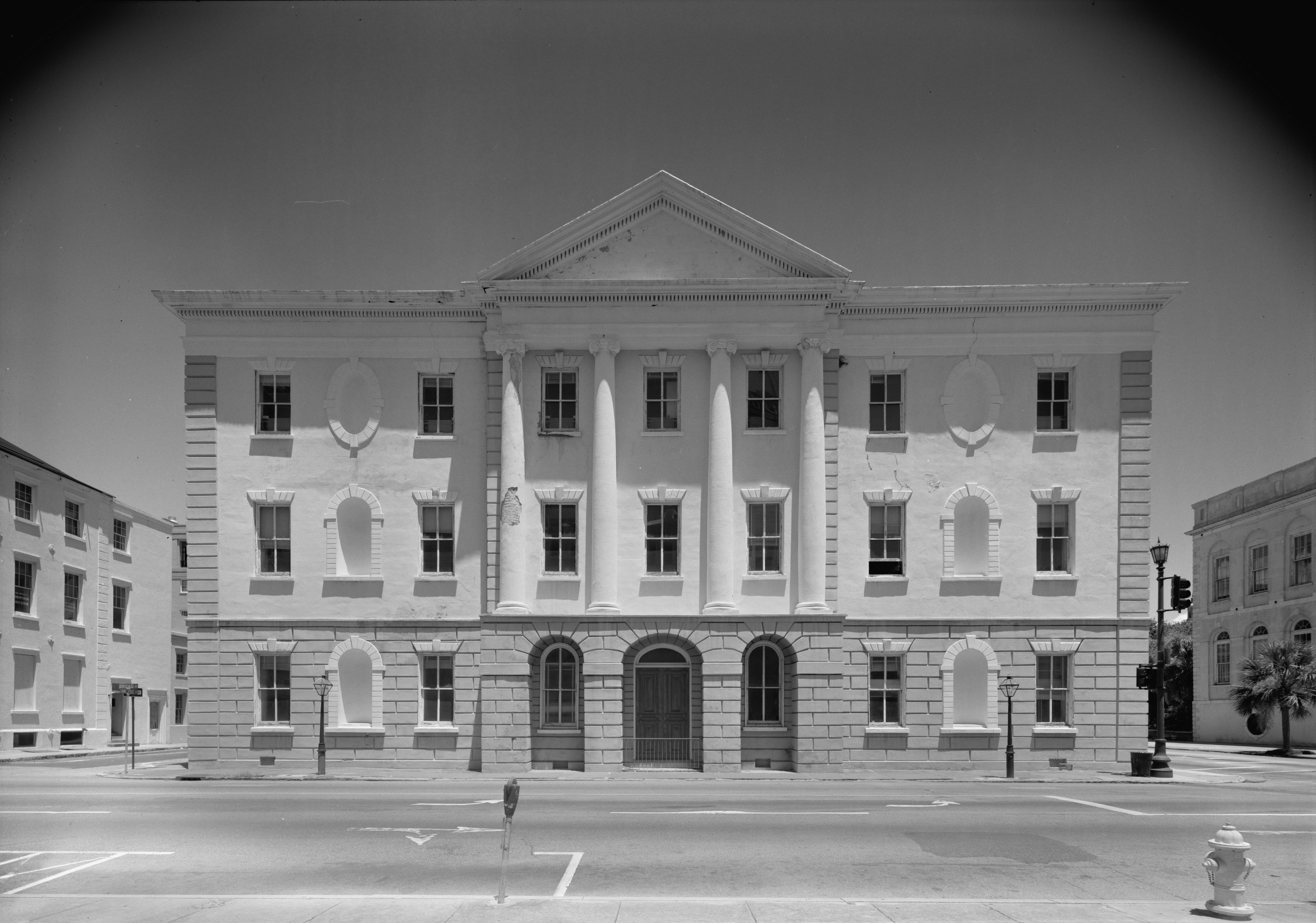
Hoban was the architect for the Charleston County Courthouse in Charleston, South Carolina, built between 1790 and 1792, which drew the attention of George Washington

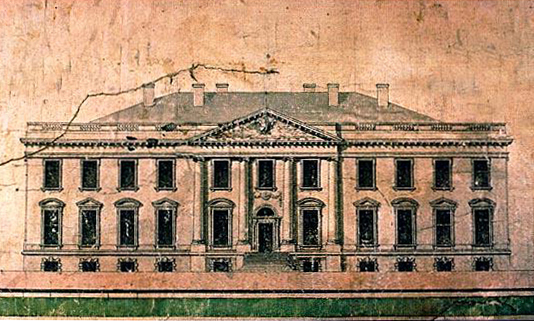
Hoban's amended elevation of the White House form late 1793 or early 1794)

Hoban was born to Edmond, a tenant farmer and Martha (née Beaghan) Hoban in 1755, and raised a Roman Catholic on the Desart Court estate belonging to the Earl of Desart in County Kilkenny, Ireland. He had at least three siblings including Philip, Joseph and Ann. He worked there as a wheelwright and carpenter until in 1779, when he was given an advanced student place in the Dublin Society's Drawing School on Lower Grafton Street in Dublin and studied under Thomas Ivory. He excelled in his studies and received the prestigious Duke of Leinster's medal from the Dublin Society in November 1780 for his drawing, Brackets, Stairs, and Roofs. Hoban was an apprentice to Ivory from 1779 until he left to go to America, likely in 1785.

Hoban arrived in South Carolina by April 1787, where he designed numerous buildings including the Charleston County Courthouse, which was built between 1790 and 1792 on the ruins of the former South Carolina Statehouse, which was built in 1753 and burned down in 1788.

== Career ==
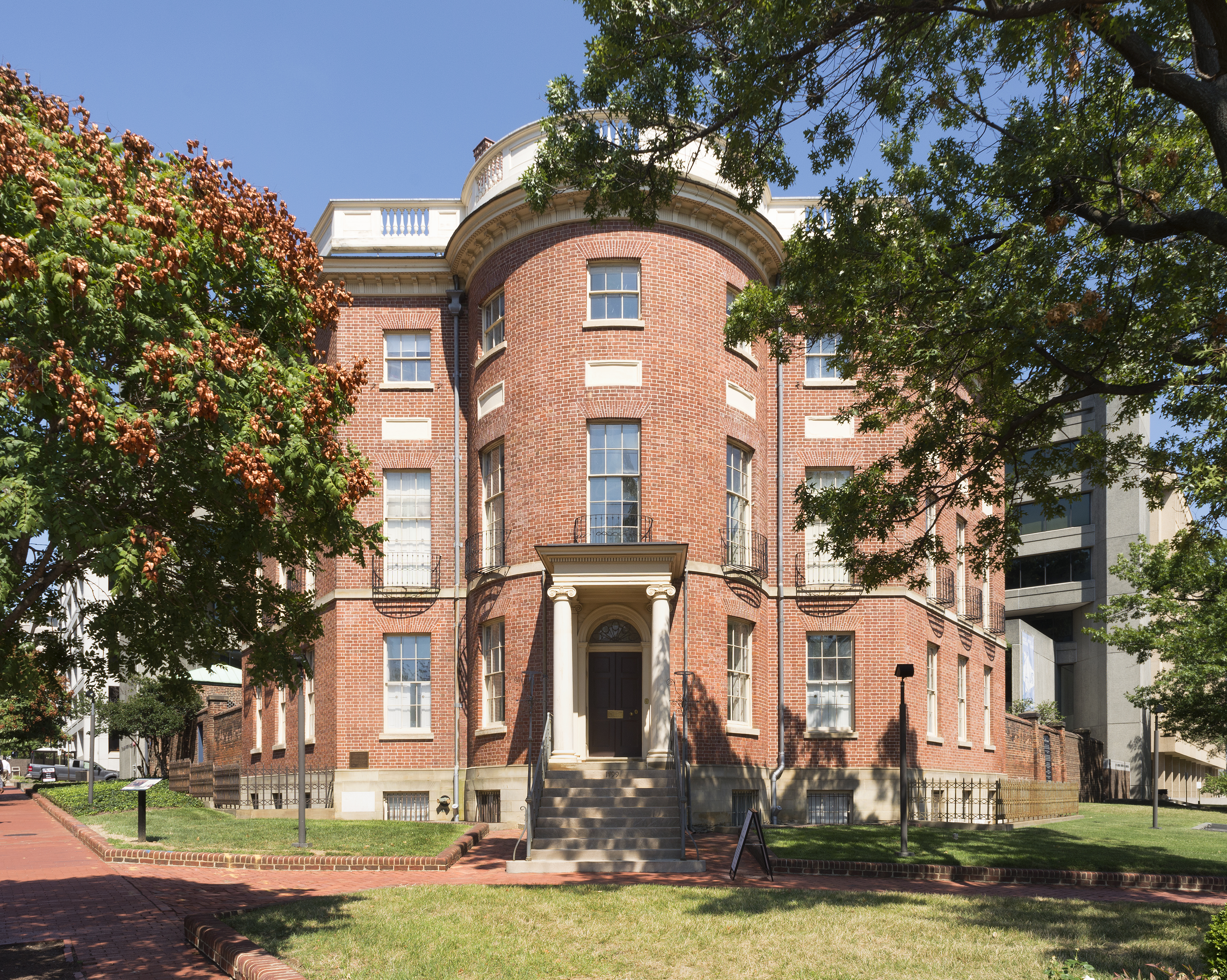
Hoban was the architect of The Octagon House in Washington, D.C.

While apprenticed to Thomas Ivory, Hoban is recorded as working as an assistant in 1781 on the building of Newcomen Bank, a Georgian bank and residence in the centre of Dublin.

Following the American Revolutionary War, Hoban emigrated to the United States, and established himself as an architect in Philadelphia in 1785. President George Washington admired Hoban's work on his Southern Tour. Washington met with Hoban in Charleston in May 1791, and summoned the architect to Philadelphia, then the nation's capital, in June 1792.

In July 1792, Hoban was named winner of the design competition for the White House. His initial design resembled the Charlestown Courthouse with a three-story facade and nine bays across. Under Washington's influence, Hoban amended it to a two-story facade, 11 bays across, and, at Washington's insistence, the whole presidential mansion was faced with stone. It is unclear whether any of Hoban's surviving drawings are actually from the competition.

Hoban owned at least three slaves who were employed as carpenters in the construction of the White House. Their names are recorded as "Ben, Daniel, and Peter" and appear on a Hoban payroll.

Hoban was also one of the supervising architects who worked on the U.S. Capitol, which was designed by William Thornton, and oversaw the architecture of The Octagon House. Hoban lived the rest of his life in Washington, D.C., where he worked on public buildings and government projects, including roads and bridges.

Hoban was a Freemason.

Hoban also is believed to have designed Rossenarra House near Kilmoganny in Ireland in 1824.

Hoban's wife, Susanna Sewall, was the sister of the prominent Georgetown City Tavern proprietor, Clement Sewall, who enlisted as a sergeant at age 19 in the Maryland Line during the Revolutionary War, was promoted six months later to ensign and then severely wounded at the Battle of Germantown.

After Washington, D.C. was granted limited home rule in 1802, Hoban served on the 12-member city council for most of the remainder of his life, except during the years he was rebuilding the White House. Hoban was also involved in the development of Catholic institutions in the city, including Georgetown University, where his son was a member of the Jesuit community, St. Patrick's Parish, and the Georgetown Visitation Monastery founded by Teresa Lalor of Ballyragget.

== Death ==
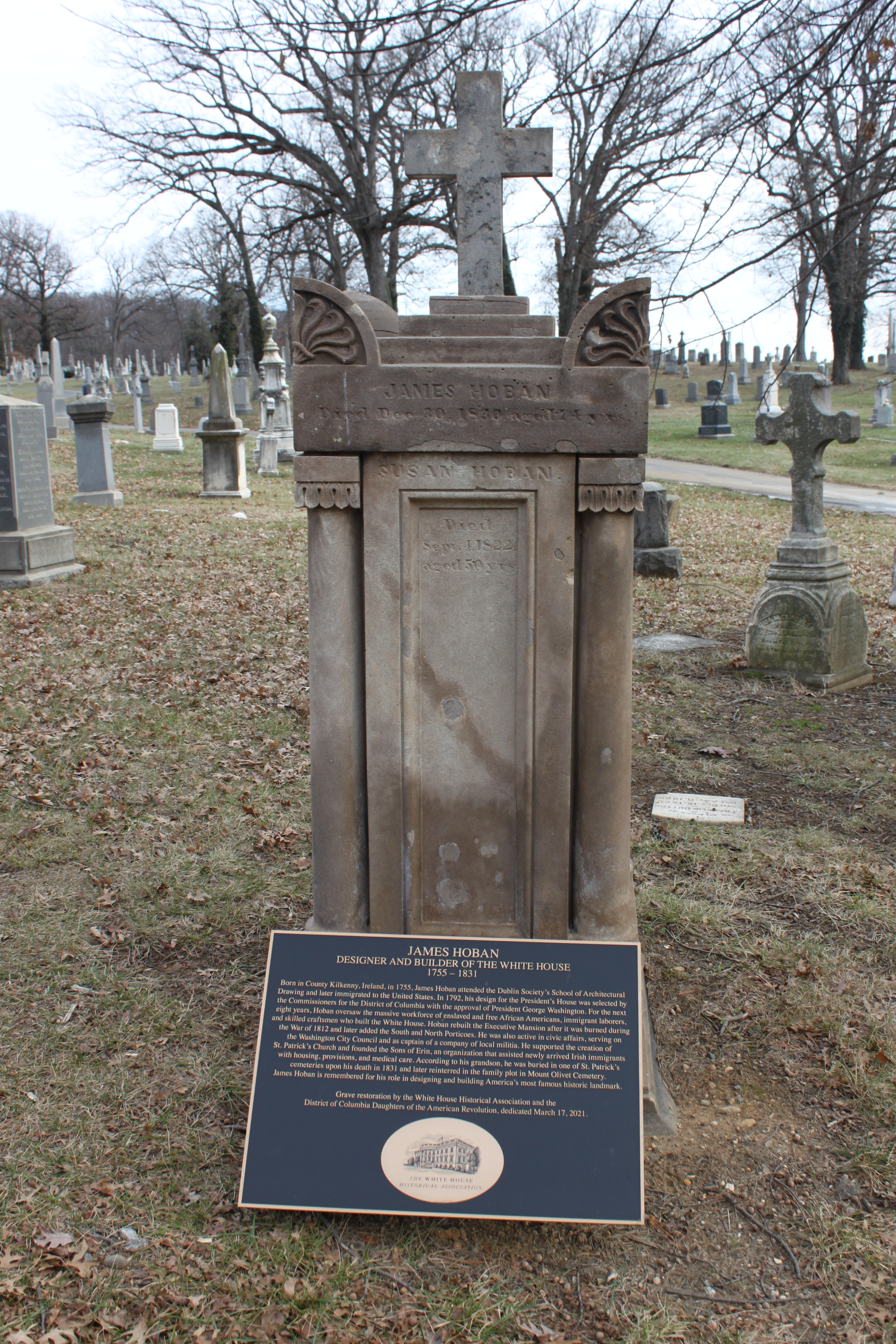
Grave of Hoban at Mount Olivet Cemetery

Hoban died in Washington, D.C., on December 8, 1831. He was originally buried at Holmead's Burying Ground, but was disinterred and reburied at Mount Olivet Cemetery in Washington, D.C.

His son James Hoban Jr., who was said to closely resemble his father, served as U.S. attorney of the District of Columbia from 1845 to 1846.

== Work ==
Little has been published to catalogue Hoban's architectural work.

- Charleston County Courthouse, 82-86 Broad Street, Charleston, SC (1790–92). Both this building and the White House were modeled on Leinster House, the current Irish Parliament Building designed by Richard Cassels, which was built for James FitzGerald, 1st Duke of Leinster.
- The White House, 1600 Pennsylvania Avenue, Washington, D.C. – (1792–1800). Following the 1814 burning of the White House, Hoban rebuilt the Southern Portico for President James Monroe (1824), and the Northern Portico for President Andrew Jackson (1829).
- The Octagon House, 1799 New York Ave, Washington DC (1802)

=== Attributed buildings ===
- Prospect Hill, also known as the Ephraim Baynard mansion, Prospect Hill Plantation, 2695 Laurel Hill Road, Edisto Island, South Carolina, c. 1790
- First Bank of the United States, Third Street between Chestnut and Walnut Streets in Philadelphia, 1795
- McCleery House, 1068 13th Street NW, Georgetown, Washington, D.C., c. 1800
- The William John Edward House, Edisto Island, South Carolina, 1810
- Baum-Taft House, also known as the Taft Museum of Art, 316 Pike Street, Cincinnati, Ohio, 1820
- Oak Hill, also known as the President James Monroe mansion, in Aldie, Virginia, 1820. Monroe sought the advice of both Hoban and Thomas Jefferson on the design of his mansion.
- Rossenarra House near Kilmaganny, Ireland, 1824
- Belcamp House at Belcamp College, Malahide Road, Dublin. The college was established around it in 1893 as a juniorate for the Oblate Fathers, and was built onto the original house that still stands intact today.

=== Demolished buildings ===
- Blodget's Union Public Hotel (a.k.a. Blodget's Lottery Hotel), site of the first General Post Office of the United States, northeast corner of 8th and E Streets, Washington, D.C. – 1783 (Demolished in 1856)
- Wye Hall (John Paca mansion), Wye Island directly opposite Wye Plantation, Maryland – c. 1787 (Demolished 1789)
- South Carolina State House, Columbia, S.C. – 1790 (burned 1865)
- The Charleston Theatre, New and Broad Streets, Charleston, S.C. – 1792 (Demolished)
- Northeast Executive Building, Fifteenth Street, near The White House (Demolished)
- Market House (a.k.a. "Marsh Market"), Pennsylvania Avenue and Seventh Street, Washington, D.C. – 1801 (Demolished)
- St. Patrick's Church, Corner of 14th and H Streets, NW, Washington, D.C. (Demolished. Now the site of the old Grand Lodge building)
- St Mary's Chapel (a.k.a. Barry's Chapel), Roman Catholic parish church, 10th and F Streets, Washington, D.C. – 1806 (Demolished; its cornerstone was saved, and is now inserted in the outer wall of the Holy Name Chapel, the Church of St. Dominic.)

== Commemorations ==
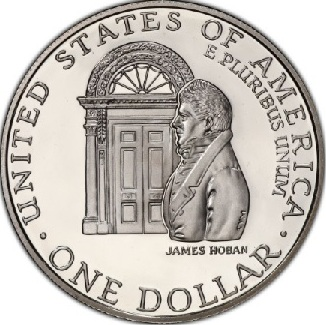
The reverse of the 1992 White House Bicentennial silver dollar features James Hoban

Numerous events were held around 2008 to commemorate the 250th anniversary of his birth.

In 2008, a memorial arbor to honor James Hoban was completed near his birthplace, and a major exhibition on his life took place at the White House Visitor Center.

Dublin Made Him..., a one-day colloquium in honour of Hoban, took place on October 3, 2008, at the Royal Dublin Society in Dublin, Ireland. It was presented by the RDS in association with the White House Historical Association, the U.S. Embassy in Ireland, and the James Hoban Societies of the U.S. and Ireland.

== See also ==
- John Henry Devereux South Carolina architect
- List of people on stamps of Ireland
- Pedro Casanave

== Bibliography ==
- Ridgely, Helen West (1908). Historic Graves of Maryland and the District of Columbia, With the Iappearing on the Tombstones in Most of the Counties of the State and in Washington and Georgetown. New York: Grafton Press.
