= John Boland (chemist) =

Irish chemist, research dean at TCD

John Boland is an Irish chemist specialising in nanoscale materials and systems who is Dean of Research at Trinity College Dublin.

== Education ==
Boland earned a bachelor's degree in chemistry from University College Dublin and a PhD in chemical physics from the California Institute of Technology.

== Career ==
In the US, Boland was a researcher at the IBM T.J. Watson Research Center and at the University of North Carolina at Chapel Hill was J. J. Hermans Professor of Chemistry and Applied and Materials Sciences and head of physical, computational and materials chemistry in the School of Chemistry. At Trinity College Dublin he was a professor and in 2004 became director of the Centre for Research on Adaptive Nanostructures and Nanodevices. As of 2017 he is Dean of Research and a researcher at the university's AMBER material science research centre.

== Honours ==
Boland is a Fellow of Trinity College (elected 2008), of the American Vacuum Society (2009) and the American Association for the Advancement of Science (2010). In 2011 he was awarded the ACSIN Nanoscience Prize. In 2013 he was the recipient of the second European Research Council Advanced Award for the physical sciences in Ireland.
