= Washington Square (Charleston) =

Park in Charleston, South Carolina

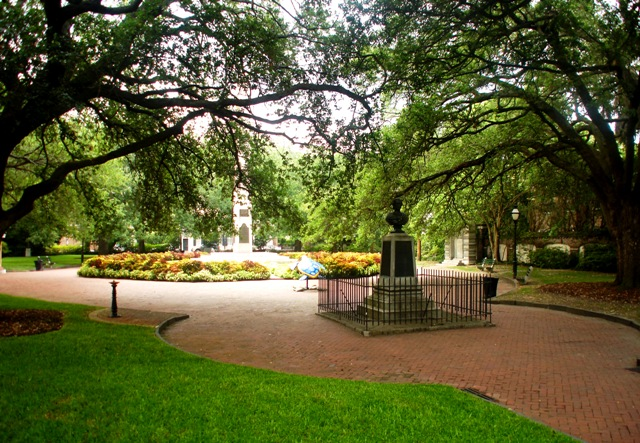
- Interactive map of Washington Square
- Type: Urban park
- Location: 80 Broad Street, Charleston, South Carolina
- Coordinates: 32°46′37″N 79°55′50″W
- Area: 1.5 acres (0.61 ha; 0.0023 mi^{2}; 0.0061 km^{2})
- Created: 1818
- Operator: City of Charleston
- Open: Sunrise to Sunset

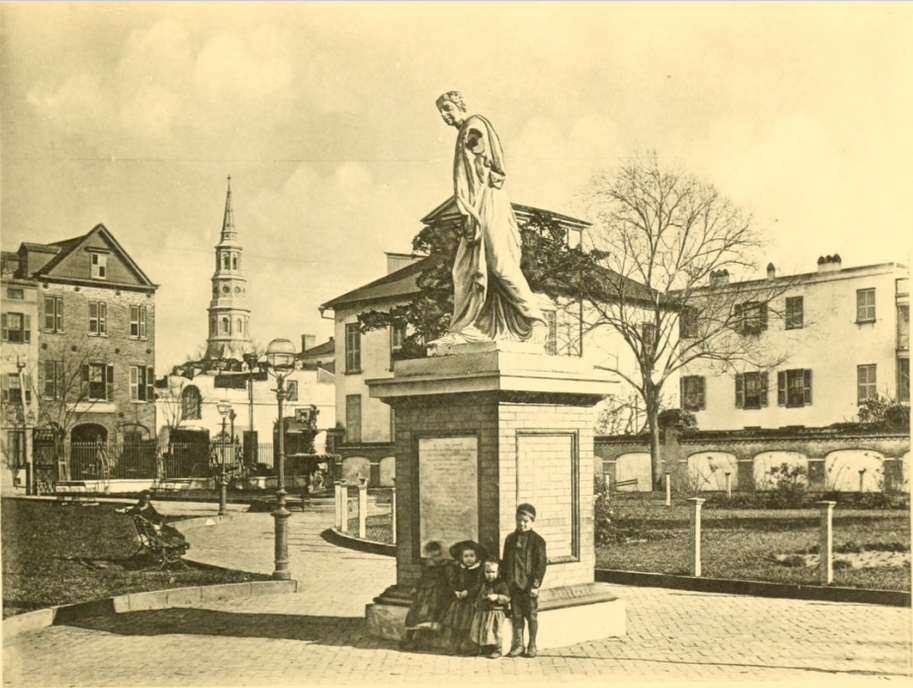
Washington Square Park's statue of William Pitt was photographed here in 1892.

Washington Square Park's layout was shown on an 1880 plat.

Washington Square is a park in downtown Charleston, South Carolina. It is located behind City Hall at the corner of Meeting Street and Broad Street in the Charleston Historic District. The planting beds and red brick walks were installed in April 1881. It was known as City Hall Park until October 19, 1881 (the centennial of the Yorktown surrender), when it was renamed in honor of George Washington. The new name was painted over the gates in December 1881.

The location of Washington Square once was the site of Corbett's Thatched Tavern. The city square was opened in 1818.

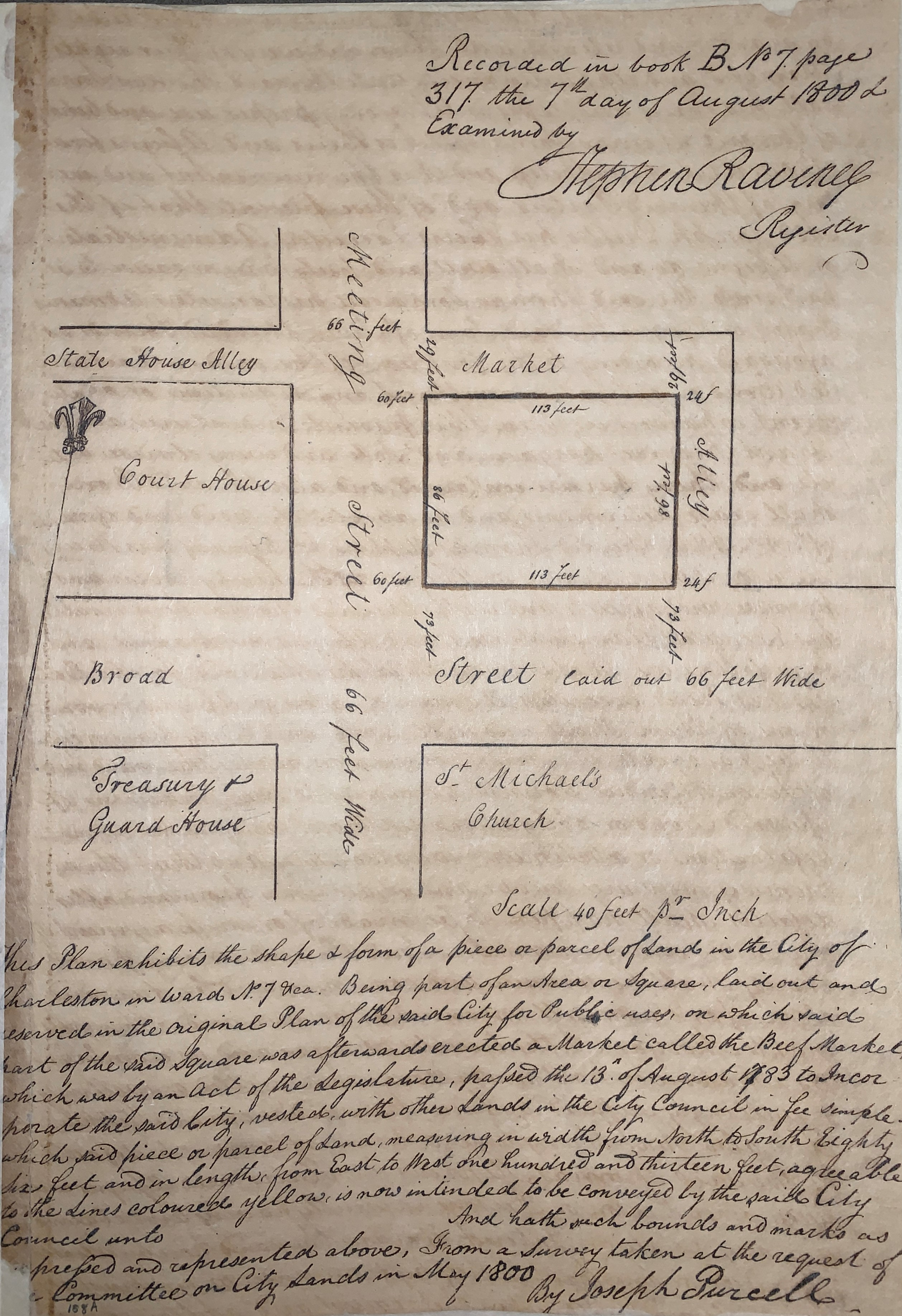
Washington Square was shown on a plat from 1800.

Along the east wall of the park is a monument to Gen. Pierre Beauregard, the Confederate general in charge of the city's defenses in 1862-1864. In 2004, the monument had repair work performed to correct a lean that had developed.

In May 1901, a bust of Henry Timrod was unveiled in the park.

On November 10, 1950, a plaque dedicated to Francis Salvador was dedicated in the park during Charleston's Jewish Bicentennial celebration.

In the center of the park is a memorial to the Washington Light Infantry. The memorial is made of Carolina gray granite and is a miniature version of the Washington Monument in Washington, D.C. The memorial is about forty-two feet high and is inscribed with the names of important military battles and the names of the unit's dead from the American Civil War. It was unveiled on February 23, 1891.

A statue of William Pitt the Elder was once located in Washington Park. The statue was moved to Washington Park from the Charleston Orphan House on Calhoun Street in 1881 and placed on a new pedestal of Fairfield County granite. The statue suffered repeated damage, including a decapitation from a falling tree branch in November 1938, before being moved to the County Courthouse. A statue of George Washington was later installed on the base of the Pitt statue following some local controversy. Plans for the new work began in 1992. The Washington statue was going to be a twice-life-size sculpture by Felix de Weldon. Eventually, Jon Michel was chosen instead. The work, which cost $165,000, was unveiled on December 14, 1999.
