= Building 170 =

- U.S. Historic district – Contributing property
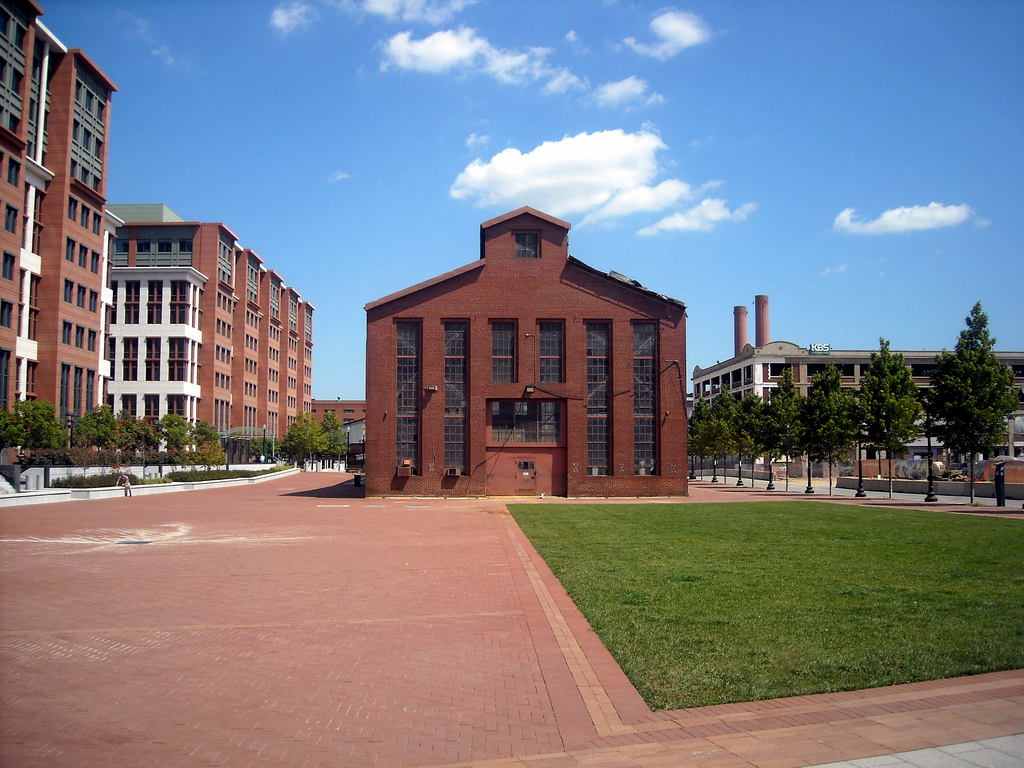
- Building 170 at Tingey Plaza. The U.S. Department of Transportation headquarters is visible on the left.
- Location: 3rd and Tingey Streets, SE; Washington, D.C., United States
- Coordinates: 38°52′29.62″N 77°0′7.41″W
- Built: 1919
- Architectural style: Colonial Revival
- Part of: Washington Navy Yard Annex Historic District (ID07001356)
- Designated CP: January 3, 2008

Building 170 is a former electrical substation located by the Anacostia River in the Navy Yard neighborhood of Washington, D.C. It is situated on the northwest corner of 3rd and Tingey Streets, Southeast, three blocks from the historic Washington Navy Yard. The industrial, two-story building was recently renovated and currently owned by the United States Department of Transportation. It is a contributing property to the Washington Navy Yard Annex Historic District, listed on the National Register of Historic Places in 2008.

== History ==
Constructed in 1919, Building 170 was part of a 60-acre (24.2 ha) industrial complex used by the United States Navy until 1962. During World War I and World War II, the Navy Yard Annex was the center of U.S. naval weapon production and ordnance technology. In 1963, ownership of Building 170 and 55 acres of the Washington Navy Yard Annex was transferred to the General Services Administration.

The GSA completed a master plan to redevelop the site for office and mixed-use to accommodate federal agencies and renovate and adapt the historic buildings. It conducted a design charrette in cooperation with the National Endowment for the Arts and nationally known designers to generate more ideas for the site. It was a model for interagency charrettes, later used by the departments of Treasury and Agriculture, among others.

In 2006, Building 170 was renovated when the U.S. Department of Transportation built its new headquarters on the same street. Upgrades to the surrounding property included the installation of fountains, landscaping, and a plaza. Future plans for the renovated building include leasing 8,000 square feet (740 m^{2}) of retail space on the first floor, with the second floor's remaining 10,500 square feet (980 m^{2}) being leased if demand rises.

On January 3, 2008, Building 170 was one of 14 structures designated as contributing properties to the Washington Navy Yard Annex Historic District. The boundaries of the historic district include M Street, the Anacostia River, Isaac Hull Avenue, and 2nd Street, SE.

== Architecture ==
Building 170 is an example of industrial Colonial Revival architecture. The 18,500 square feet (1,720 m^{2}) steel-framed building is faced in red brick, and features an open interior and metal shed roof. A pronounced ridge monitor runs along the entire length of the building.

== See also ==
- History of the United States Navy
- History of Washington, D.C.
- National Register of Historic Places listings in the District of Columbia
