= Navy Yard (Washington, D.C.) =

Coordinates: 38°52′37.21″N 77°0′5.86″W

- Neighborhood
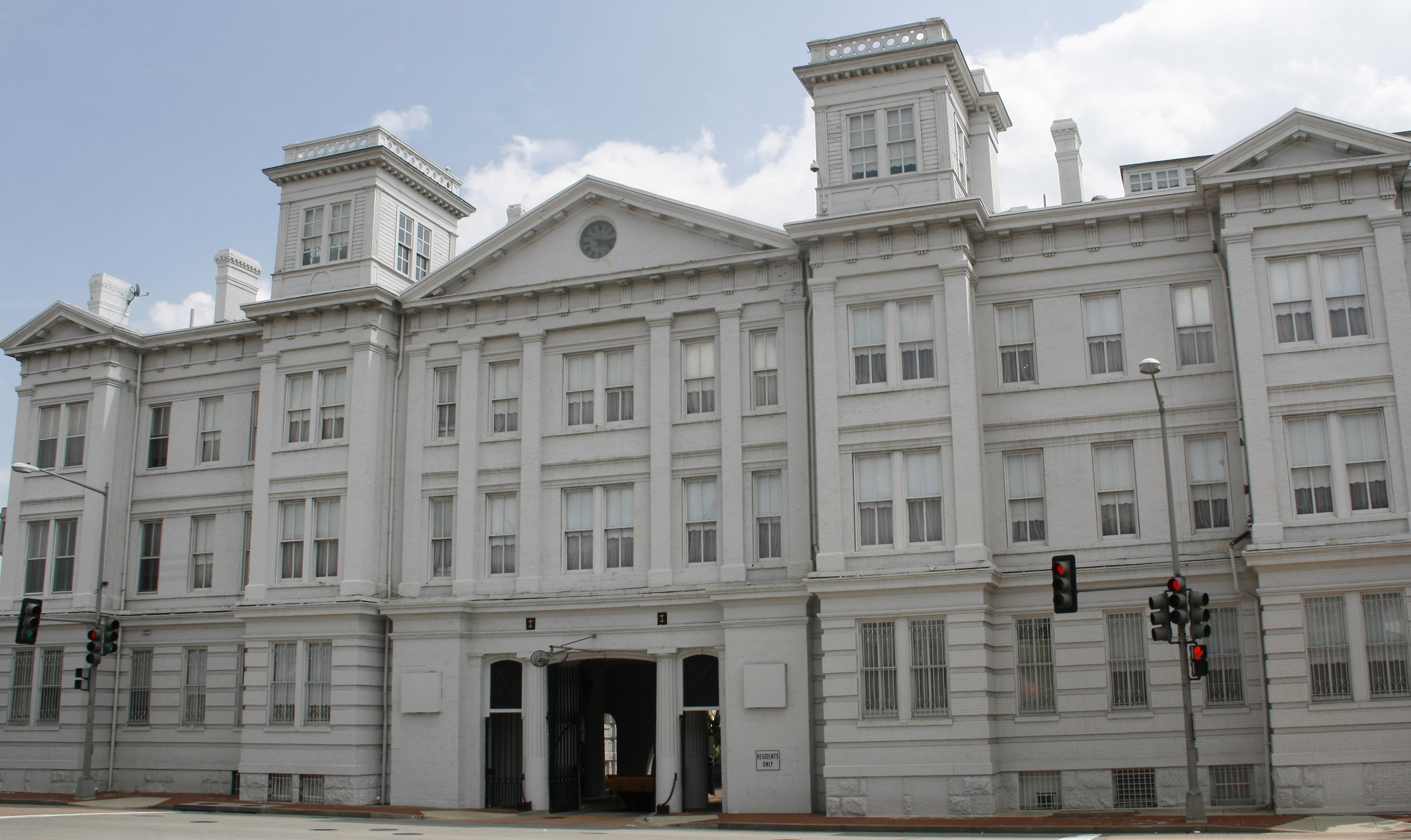
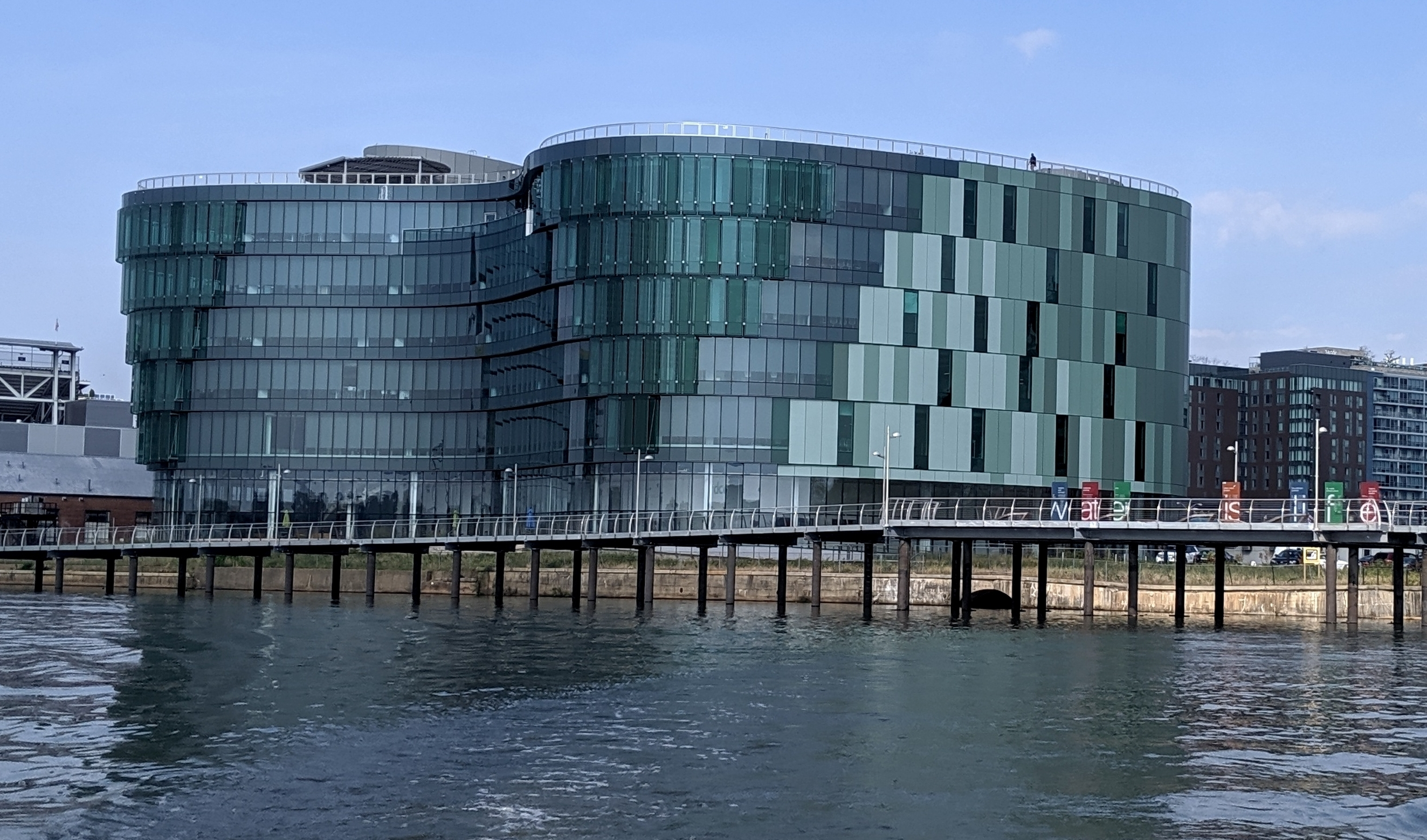
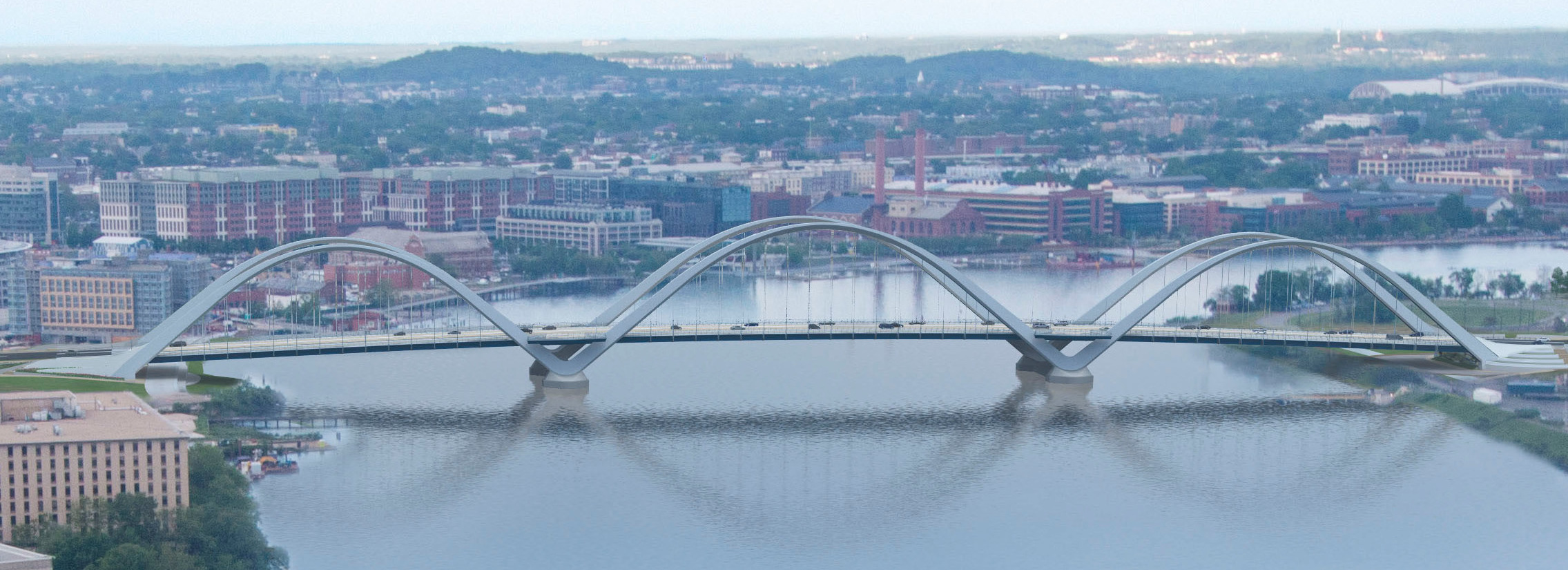
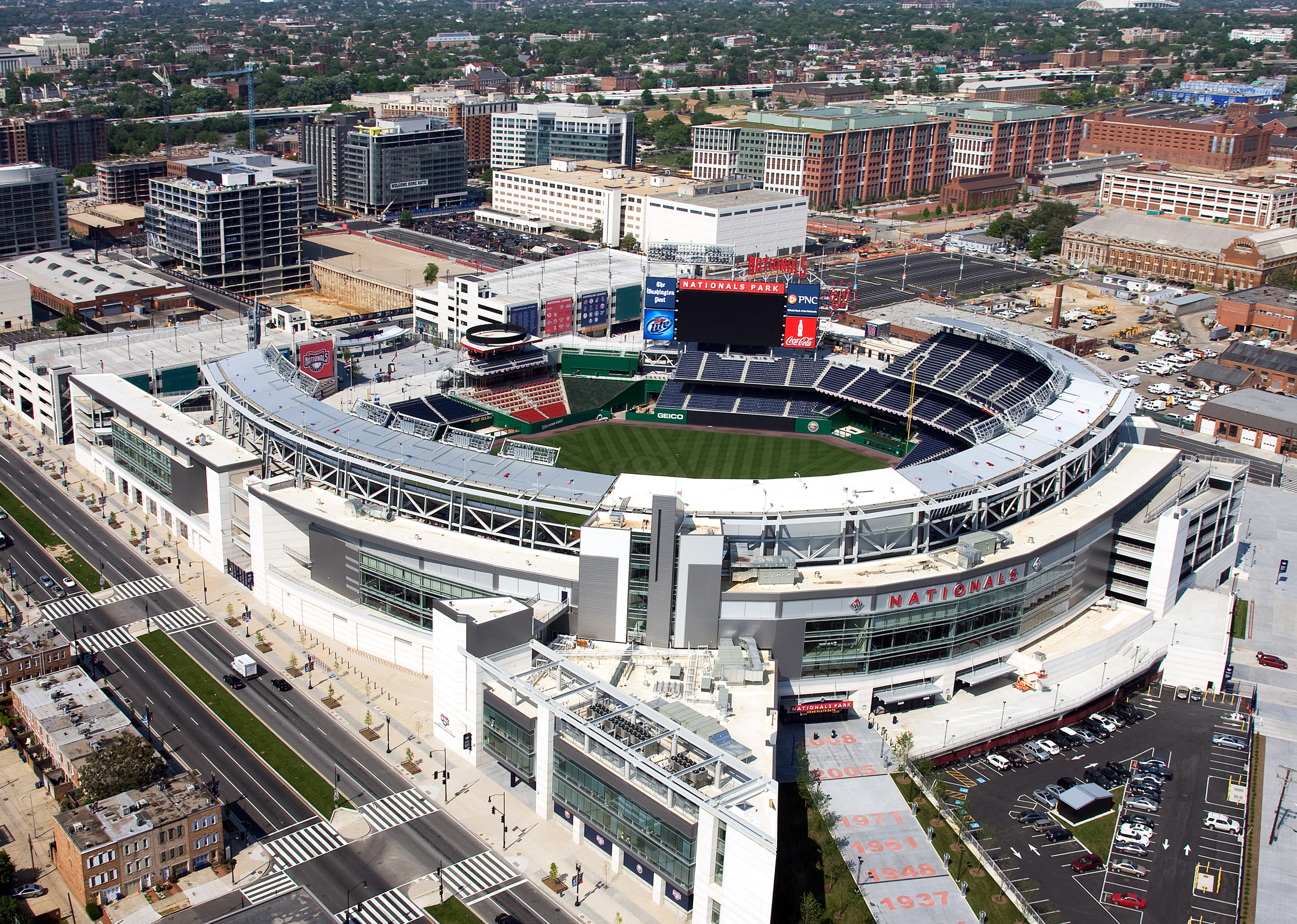
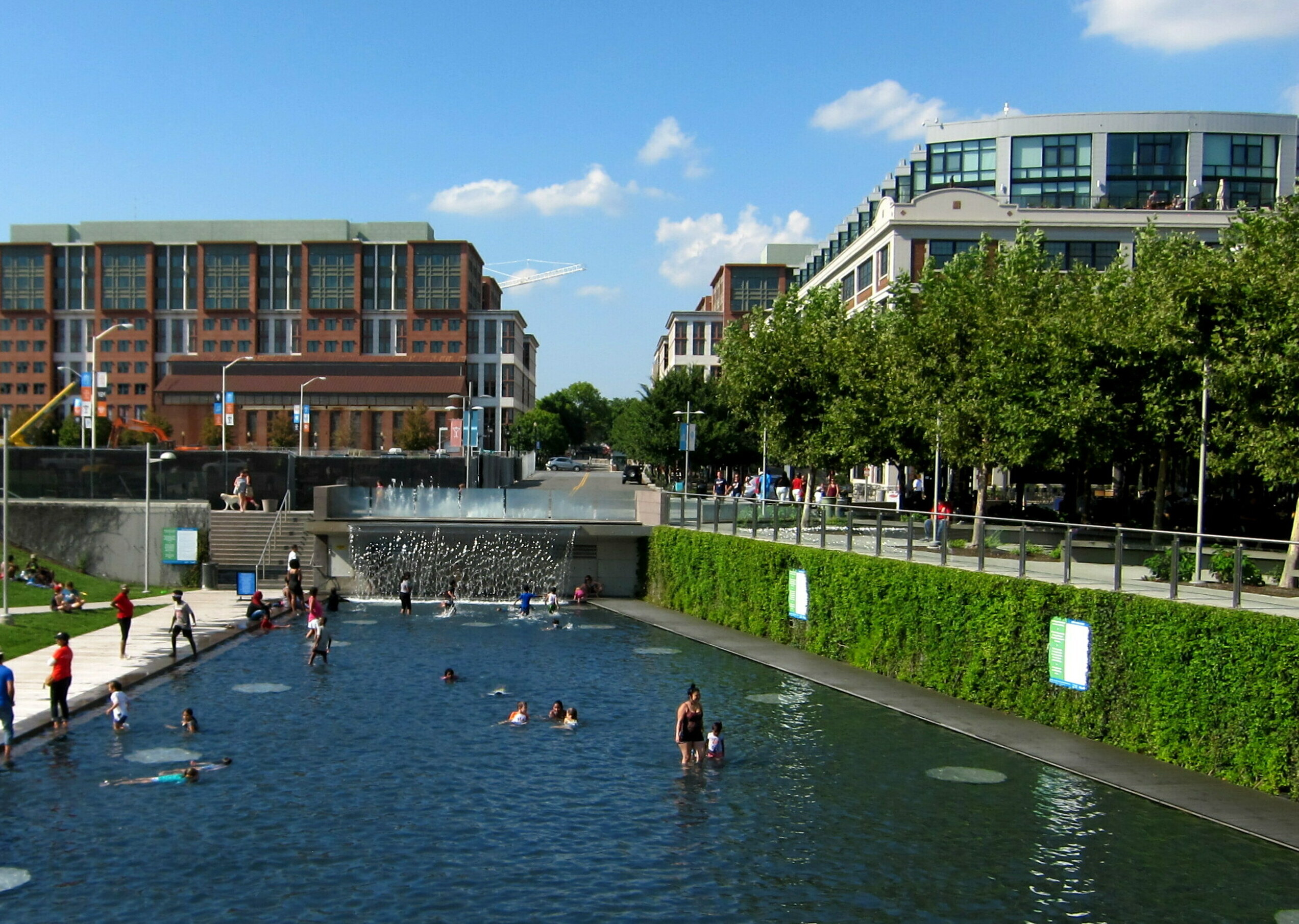
- Top: Latrobe Gate (left) and DC Water headquarters (right); middle: view of Navy Yard beyond the Frederick Douglass Memorial Bridge; bottom: Nationals Park (left) and The Yards Park (right).

- Navy Yard within the District of Columbia
- Country: United States
- District: Washington, D.C.
- Ward: Ward 8

Government
  - Councilmember: Trayon White

Area
  - Total: .53 sq mi (1.4 km^{2})

Population (2020)
  - Total: 11,036
  - Density: 20,823/sq mi (8,040/km^{2})
- Postal code: ZIP code

Navy Yard is a neighborhood of Washington, D.C., located in Southeast D.C. Navy Yard, situated along the Anacostia Riverfront south of Capitol Hill, takes its name from Washington Navy Yard, the administrative seat of the U.S. Navy. Historically an industrial area, today Navy Yard is a popular entertainment district, home to Nationals Park, a notable nightlife scene, and numerous waterfront esplanades.

== History ==
=== 18th century ===
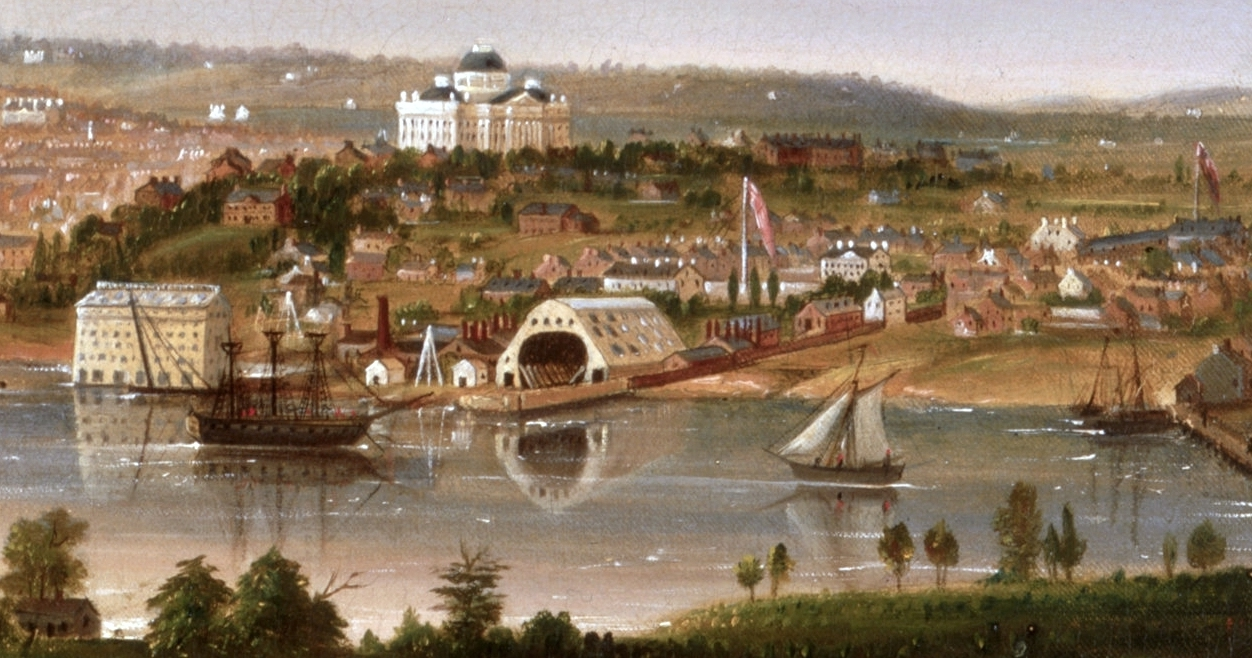
View of Navy Yard in 1833

Historically, the Anacostia River was once a deep water channel with natural resources and home to the Nacotchtank Indians. In 1791 Pierre Charles L’Enfant designed the plan for Washington, D.C., and, recognizing the assets of the Anacostia River, located the city's new commercial center and wharfs there. In 1799 the Washington Navy Yard was established in the area. It was the nation's largest naval shipbuilding facility for several decades. Today the Washington Navy Yard is the U.S. Navy's longest continuously operated federal facility.

Navy Yard was Washington's earliest industrial neighborhood. One of the earliest industrial buildings was the eight-story brick Sugar House, built in Square 744 at the foot of New Jersey Avenue SE as a sugar refinery in 1797–98.

=== 19th century ===
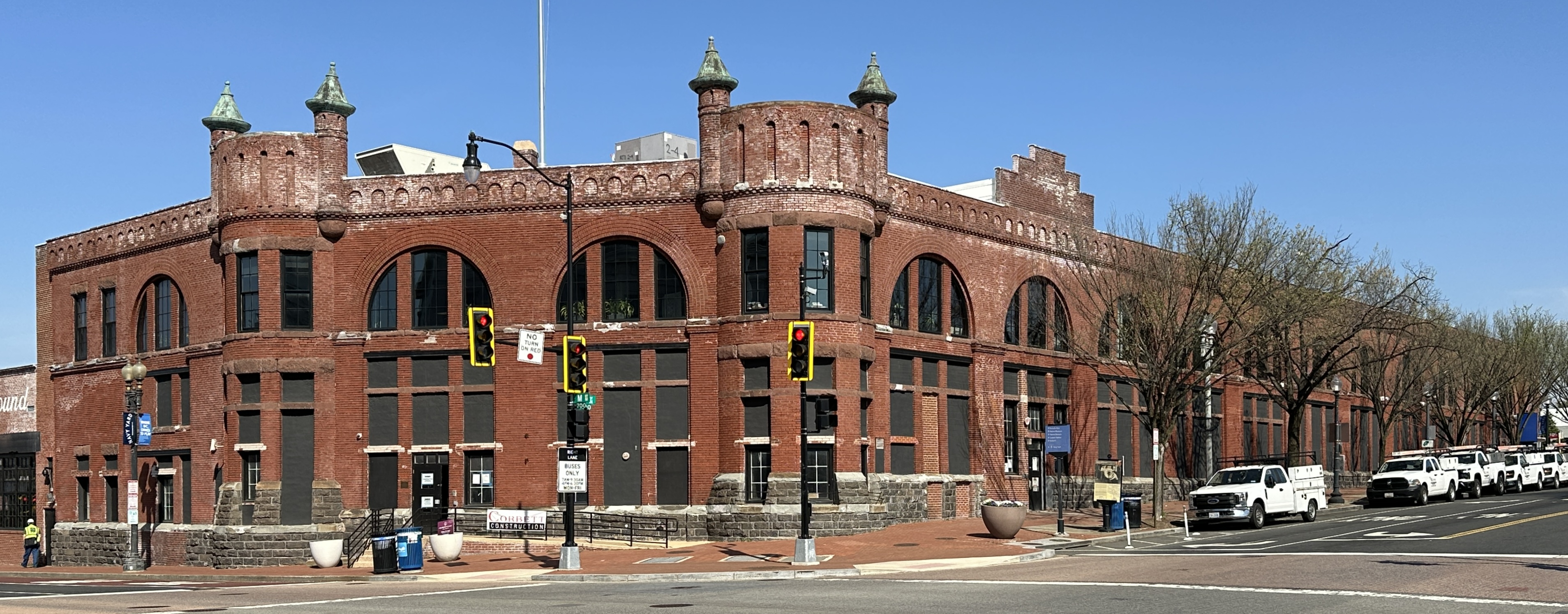
Washington and Georgetown Railroad Car House, built in 1891

In 1805, the Sugar House became the Washington Brewery, which produced beer until it closed in 1836. The brewery site was just west of the Washington City Canal in what is now Parking Lot H/I in the block between Nationals Park and the historic DC Water pumping station.

The Navy Yard was a bustling nautical center during the 19th century and played an integral role in developing the area. The lively wharf was a hub for jobs, serving ships with lumber and raw materials for the growing city. It also played a key role in defending the city from the British during the War of 1812. Surrounding the wharves was an extensive commercial district, light industrial businesses, and one of the city's most significant neighborhood communities. As the city and nation evolved, the Navy Yard changed from shipbuilding to production of finished ship products and weapons ammunition.

=== 20th century ===
By the mid‑1940s, the Navy Yard and the expanded Annex area reached peak production with 26,000 employees in 132 buildings on 127 acres (0.51 km^{2}) of land.

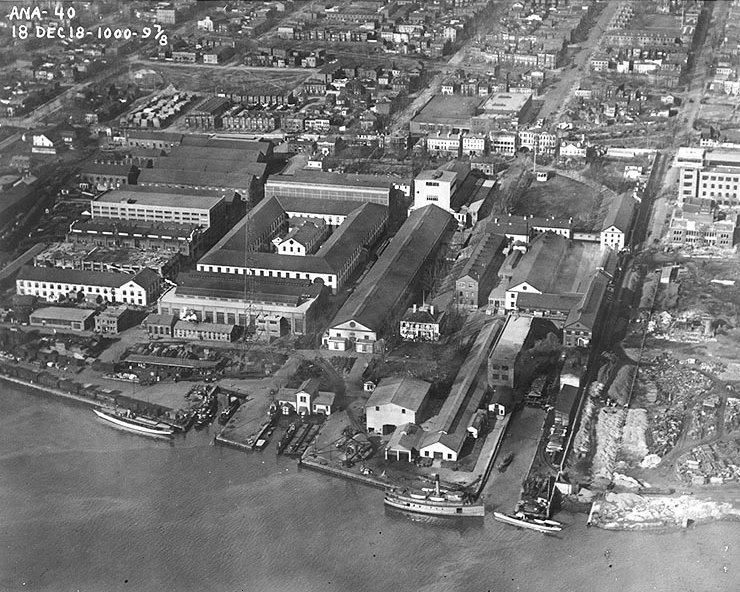
Washington Navy Yard in 1918

However, during the 20th century, the river deteriorated due to pollution. After World War II, the Navy Yard consolidated its operations to a smaller campus, which slowed the economic and neighborhood activity of the area. Furthermore, around this same time, the elevated portion of Interstate 395 was completed, creating a physical barrier for access to the river. The confluence of these factors led the riverfront neighborhoods to become neglected and overrun with crime.

Redevelopment of Near Southeast has been a goal of the government of the District of Columbia and business groups since the downsizing of the Navy's facilities in the early 1960s. The National Capital Planning Commission initiated several studies throughout the 1960s and 1970s that imagined considerably increased density along South Capitol Street and public parkland along the riverbank. None of these plans were implemented. Later, DC initiated a large redevelopment plan of the area between South Capitol, M, and 1st Streets and the Anacostia River. The Dravo Corporation won the community development contract and hired Charles I. Bryant to master plan a project, which they named "Capitol Gateway." The project failed in the early 1980s and led to industrial users and residents leaving the area. Subsequently, developers, the DC Government, and the Federal City Council envisioned redevelopment into the mid-1990s. None of these later plans were successful, but they set the pattern of development for the area that has followed.

=== 21st century ===
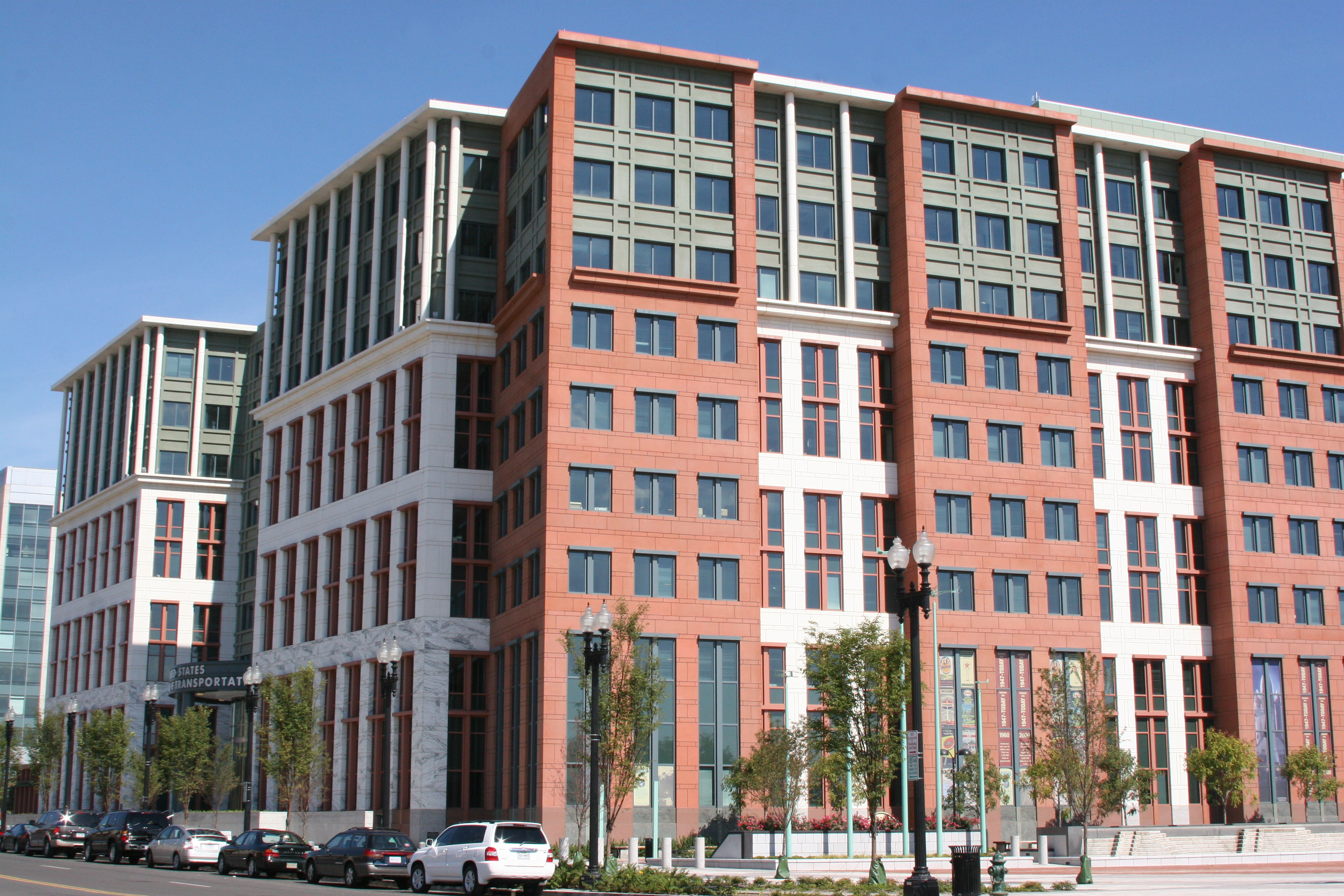
U.S. Department of Transportation headquarters, built in 2007.

Redevelopment began in earnest in the early 2000s, leading to the displacement of the industrial uses and adult-entertainment district. A major spur to redevelopment was a requirement of the Department of the Navy that contractors locate offices within a short distance of the Navy Yard. The construction of the U.S. Department of Transportation office complex and Nationals Park, the 2008 $600 million stadium of the Washington Nationals Major League Baseball team, have stimulated growth in the neighborhood. Most of the neighborhood's land and businesses have been purchased by companies and is currently being developed into commercial and residential projects. Current plans are to construct 12 to 15,000,000 square feet (1,400,000 m^{2}) of office space, 9,000 residential units, 1,200 hospitality rooms, 800,000 square feet (74,000 m^{2}) of retail space, four public parks, and an Anacostia Riverwalk trail system.

In 2001, the Arthur Capper/Carrollsburg public housing development was closed, for redevelopment which opened in 2008.

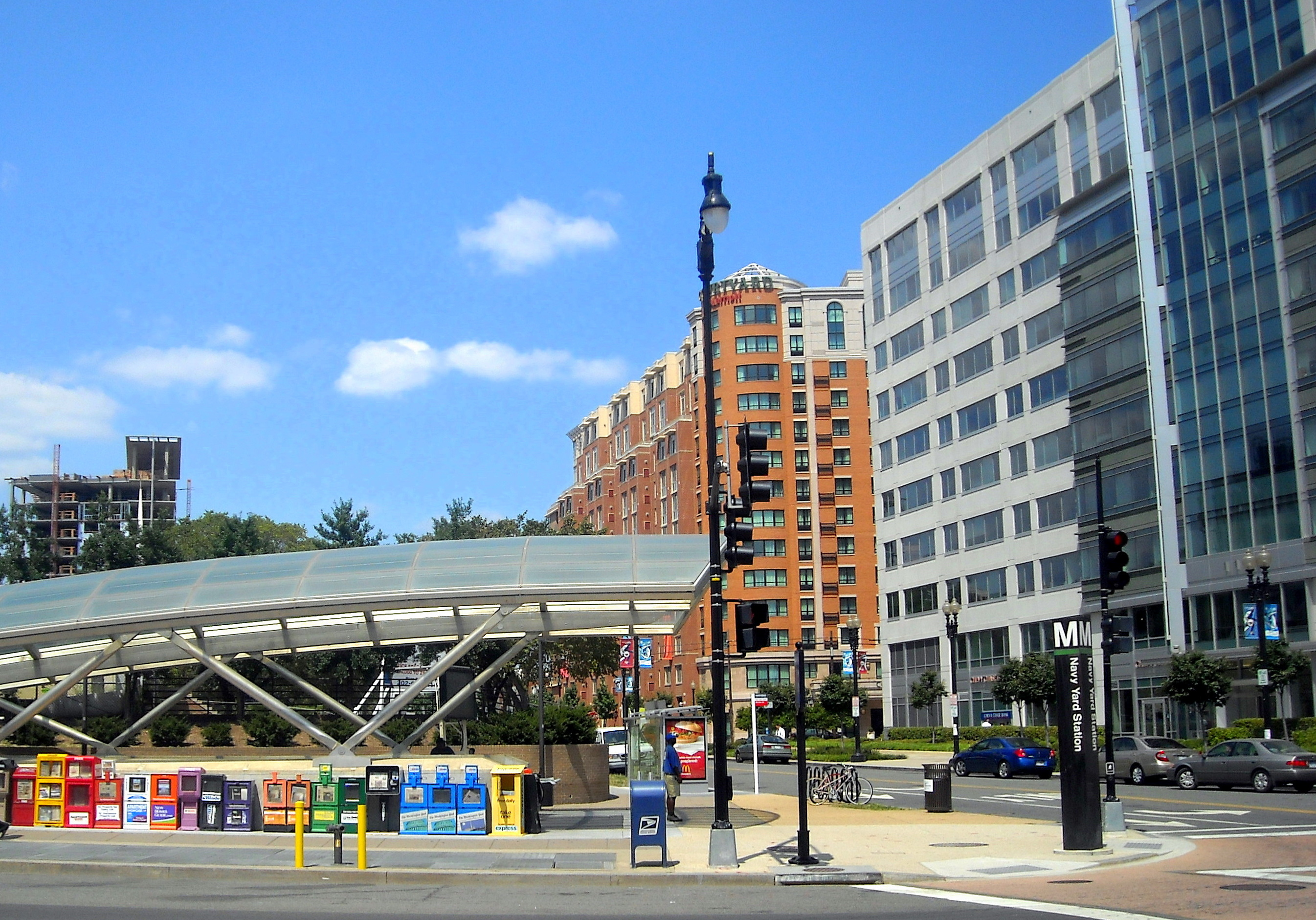
The Navy Yard – Ballpark station of the Washington Metro.

In 2007, The United States Department of Transportation (USDoT) relocated to the area with a new headquarters on New Jersey Avenue. The Yards, a public-private development, began construction in 2007 and the entire project is to be completed in three phases over 10–20 years.

Nationals Park, home of the Washington Nationals, opened in 2008.

In 2013, the neighborhood was the site of the Washington Navy Yard shooting. In 2021, Navy Yard was subjected to another shooting outside Nationals Park, injuring three.

The new Frederick Douglass Memorial Bridge was completed in 2021.

== Geography ==
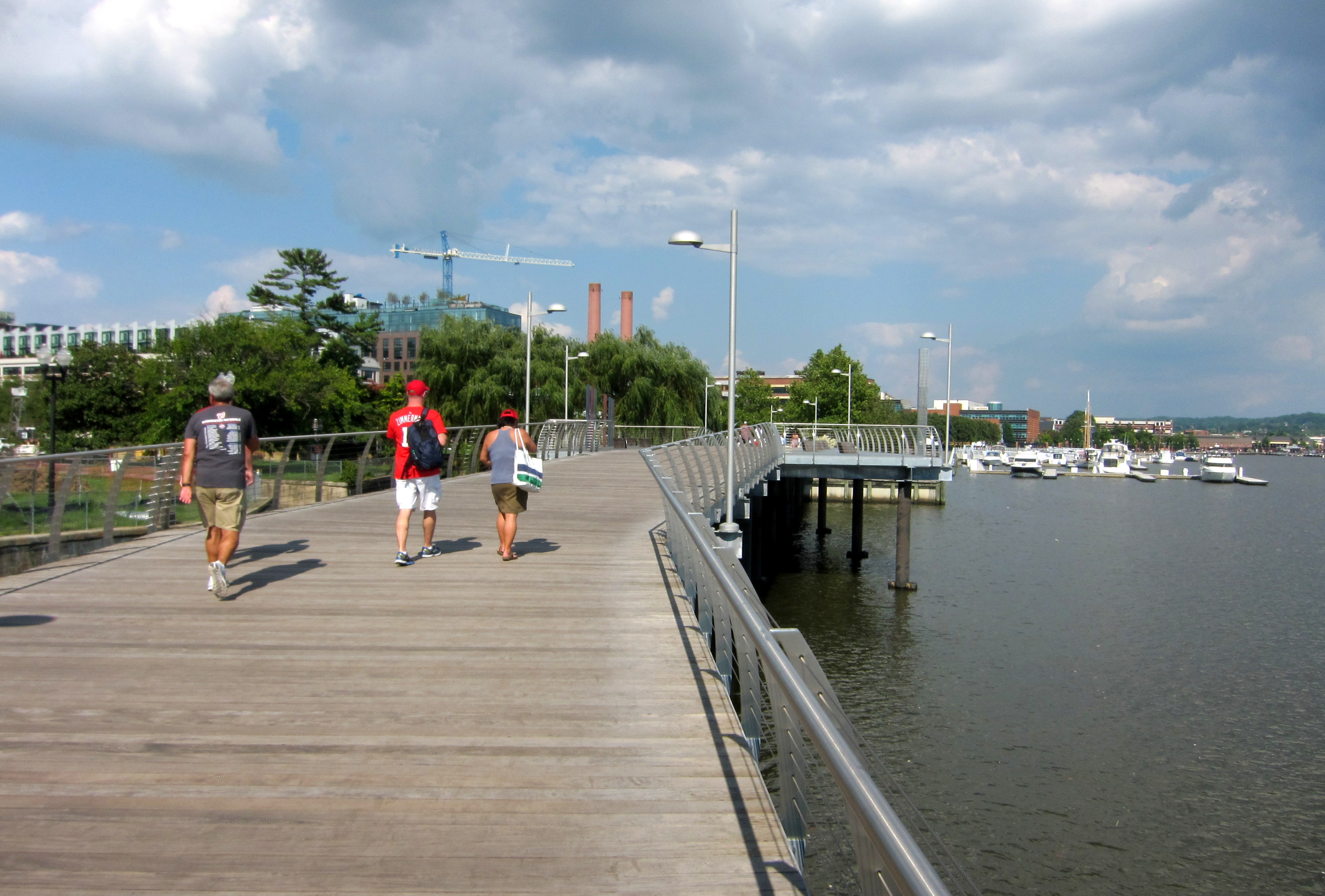
Anacostia Riverwalk Trail

Navy Yard is bounded by Interstate 695 to the north and east, South Capitol Street to the west, and the Anacostia River to the south. Approximately half of its area (south of M Street, SE) is occupied by the Washington Navy Yard (including the Naval Historical Center), which gives the neighborhood its name.

The neighborhood is located in D.C.'s Ward 8, currently represented by Trayon White.

== Landmarks ==
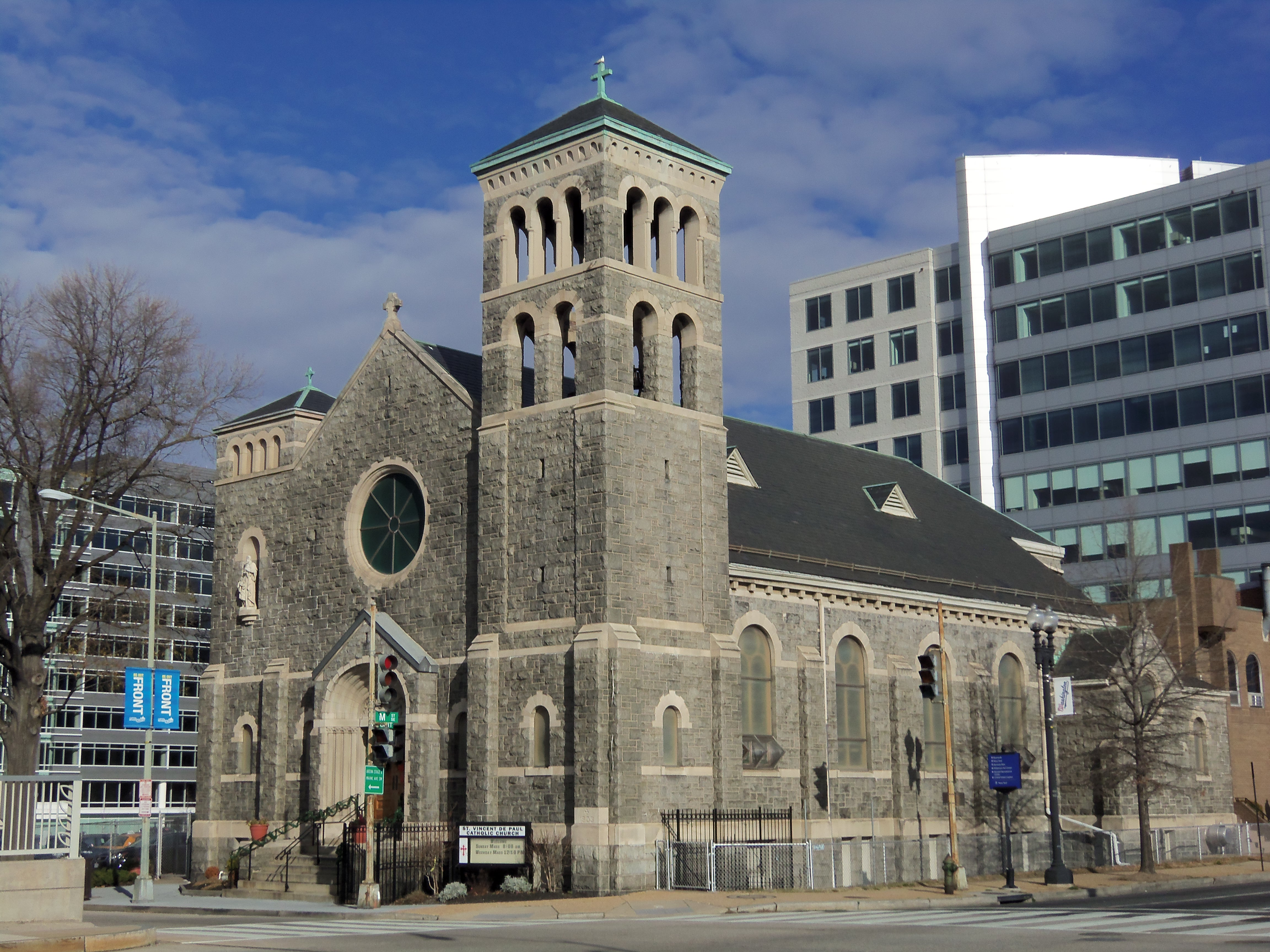
St. Vincent de Paul Church

Among Navy Yard's landmarks are:

- Latrobe Gate
- Blue Castle
- Building 170

Washington Canal Park is a park which follows part of the course of the former Washington City Canal.

Nationals Park is the home of the Washington Nationals, of Major League Baseball.

== Education ==
The District of Columbia Public Schools operates public schools. Navy Yard is served by Van Ness Elementary School, Jefferson Middle School Academy and Eastern High School.

== Transportation ==
It is served by the Navy Yard – Ballpark station, on the Green Line of the Washington Metro.

== See also ==
- Michael Shiner, 19th-century diarist and Navy Yard worker
