= Barney Circle =

- Neighborhood
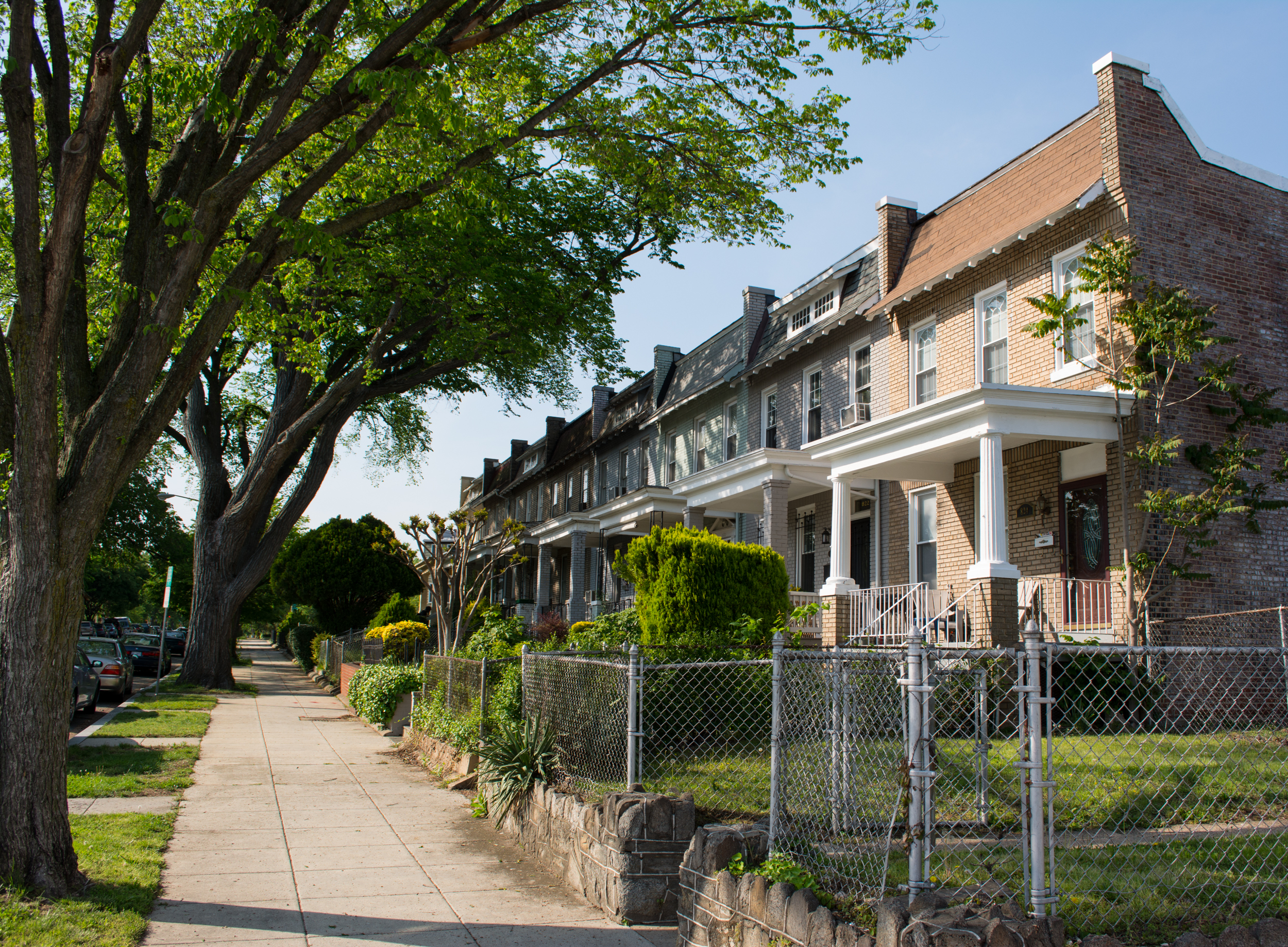
- 800 block of Kentucky Avenue SE in the Barney Circle neighborhood in 2014
- Interactive map of Barney Circle
- Coordinates: 38°52′42.6″N 076°58′50.5194″W
- Country: United States
- Territory: Washington, D.C.
- Constructed: c. 1917
- Named for: Commodore Joshua Barney

Barney Circle is a section within the Hill East neighborhood located along the west bank of the Anacostia River in southeast Washington, D.C., in the United States. The neighborhood is characterized by its sense of community, activism, walkability, and historic feel. The neighborhood's name derives from the eponymous former traffic circle Pennsylvania Avenue SE just before it crosses the John Philip Sousa Bridge over the Anacostia. The traffic circle is named for Commodore Joshua Barney, Commander of the Chesapeake Bay Flotilla in the War of 1812.

== Neighborhood ==
The Barney Circle neighborhood or also known as Hill East covers the area bounded by L street SE, Southeast Boulevard SE, 14th Street SE, East Capitol Street SE, 22nd Street SE and Independence Avenue SE. However, many of the residents of the surrounding areas (such as the Lincoln Park and Capitol Hill East neighborhoods) consider themselves to live in Barney Circle. The neighborhood's imprecise boundaries may stretch as far north as East Capitol Street, as far south as the Southeast Boulevard, and as far east as D.C. Jail at 19th and D Streets SE.

== History ==
The Congressional Cemetery was established in 1807 and the Eastern Methodist Cemetery operated from 1824 to 1892. Even though the neighborhood now known as Barney Circle was located near the District's Eastern Market and the Navy Yard, the construction of ammunition depots and the Washington Asylum Hospital in the mid-19th century push development southward on Barrack's Row in lieu of eastward on Pennsylvania Avenue SE. The neighborhood known as Barney Circle remained relatively undeveloped and its streets remained unpaved throughout the 19th century. The Pennsylvania Avenue Bridge that connected the neighborhood known as Barney Circle to neighborhoods east of the Anacostia River built until 1890.

The neighborhood began to develop in 1902 after Arthur E. Randle won approval from the Congress to lay streetcar tracks across the bridge. The first houses in the core of the neighborhood were built in 1905. The East Washington Heights Traction Railroad was incorporated on June 18, 1898. By 1903 it ran from the Capitol along Pennsylvania Avenue SE to Barney Circle, and by 1908, it went across the bridge to Randle Highlands (now known as Twining) as far as 27th St SE. By 1917 it had been extended out Pennsylvania Avenue past 33rd Street SE., but the company ceased operations by 1923.

In 1911 the Congress passed an act "to confirm the name of Commodore Barney Circle", after a local builder presented a paper on Barney to the Columbia Historical Society in 1910. The neighborhood experienced a building boom between 1919 and 1924, when over 70% of its buildings were constructed. At one point, up to 25 percent of the neighborhood was populated by individuals who worked at the Navy Yard. The rowhouses built to serve those blue-collar workers were modest, but comfortable. Most of the single-family brick rowhouses homes have at least two stories, two-three bedrooms, a couple of bathrooms, small yards, and low porches.

Earlier developments on Capitol Hill featured homes which were narrow and deep, while the homes in the Barney Circle neighborhood are relatively wide and shallow. These types of homes, an innovation in the first decade of the 20th century, are known as "daylight rowhouses" because each room was lit as much as possible by sunlight coming through windows. The homes in the Barney Circle neighborhood generally are set back from the street at a uniform distance, and have a small front yard and an open-air porch. As with most rowhouses, the homes typically have mansard roofs with dormers which provide third-floor sleeping, working, or storage space.

Although little of the architecture in the area is outstanding, the neighborhood has retained its historic appearance. Few homeowners have installed modern siding or altered their structure in an ahistoric manner.

The District of Columbia Public Charter School Board operates Friendship Public Charter School in Barney Circle that serves students from pre-K through the eighth grade.

== Governance and Administrative Divisions ==
Barney Circle is located within Ward 6. Charles Allen has represented the neighborhood on the Council of the District of Columbia since January 2015.

The heart of the community is located within Advisory Neighborhood Commission (ANC) 6B. The core of Barney Circle is zoned in ANC 6B09, and may extend into 6B06, 6B07, 6B08, 6B10, and 7F07.

== Culture ==
The Congressional Cemetery was created in 1807 holds the remains of Elbridge Gerry, a signer of the Declaration of Independence and former Vice President, Civil War photographer Mathew Brady, the "March King" John Philip Sousa, the former FBI Director, among other famous notables. The revival of the Congressional Cemetery in the early 2000s helped rejuvenate the neighborhood. The Association for the Preservation of Historic Congressional Cemetery manages the cemetery's K9 program, a program that allows 770 dogs the privilege to roam freely over the 35-acre property, as well as the "Rest in Bees" honey and "Notes from the Crypt" chamber music concerts. The cemetery also hosts film screenings and weddings.

The announcement to build Nationals Park in September 2014 in Navy Yard - a thirty-five minute walk from the core of Barney Circle - catalyzed further development in the neighborhood like Trusty's Full-Serve bar. Trusty's has functioned as neighborhood tavern that has operated in Barney Circle since 2005 with a clientele who avidly support the Washington Nationals and D.C. United. Wisdom, a gin parlor, opened in 2008 is known for its luxe cocktails and large selection of absinthe. The completion of the pedestrian bridge northwest of the Sousa bridge connected the neighborhood to The Wharf via the Anacostia Riverwalk Trail in the second decade of the 21st century.

Barney Circle has three additional common green spaces where residents walk their dogs, practice guerilla gardening, and other beautification efforts: Dennis Dolinger Memorial Park, Commodore Barney Circle itself, and the Pennsylvania Avenue SE median.

Neighborhood Restaurant Group is planning to open a "culinary clubhouse", branded as "The Roost" in 2020 that will accommodate over 400 seats. The Roost will include a sundae and frozen shop, "retro German health food", a taco stand, a beer bar, and a cocktail bar that will specialize in cocktails with a low alcohol percentage.

Hill Rag, a monthly community newspaper "of record", has reported on developments in and around Barney Circle since 1976.

The Seafarers Yacht Club of Washington, DC, was established in 1945 south of the Congressional Cemetery. It is, by some assessments, the oldest African American boat club on the East Coast.

== Transit and transportation ==
Barney circle is accessible via metro, express bus lines, highways, and Capital Bikeshare dock. The neighborhood is served by Potomac Avenue station and Stadium–Armory station and the 36 Pennsylvania Avenue busline.

The John Philip Sousa Bridge was completed in 1942 and is named after the famed composer and DC native, who had died in 1933.

== Traffic circle ==
Barney Circle was part of the original L'Enfant Plan for the District of Columbia. However, it was designated a square, not a traffic circle, on the city's original plats. In 1867, the Philadelphia, Baltimore and Washington Railroad obtained the rights to the land where Barney Circle would be built for the purpose of building a rail crossing over the Anacostia. This along with reports by the Office of Public Buildings and Grounds (OPB&G) in the 1880s and 1890s that much of the area was under water at high tide, prevented the construction of a circular park as had been planned. By 1903, was constructed as a traffic circle instead, with the name "Pennsylvania Avenue Circle", and Pennsylvania Avenue passing through it to the Pennsylvania Avenue Bridge. On August 19, 1911, President William Howard Taft signed S. 306 into law (Public Law No. 33), formally changing the name of the circle to "Commodore Barney Circle" in honor of Commodore Joshua Barney, though it was sometimes referred to as "Admiral Barney Circle".

In 1939, the construction of the downstream span of the new John Philip Sousa Bridge reconfigured Barney Circle. A streetcar turnaround and bus lane was carved from the center of the circle, and a $7,000 bus and streetcar terminal occupied the western portion of the site. The terminal opened on January 26, 1941, and ceased operation in 1960.

=== The Inner Loop's effect on Barney Circle ===
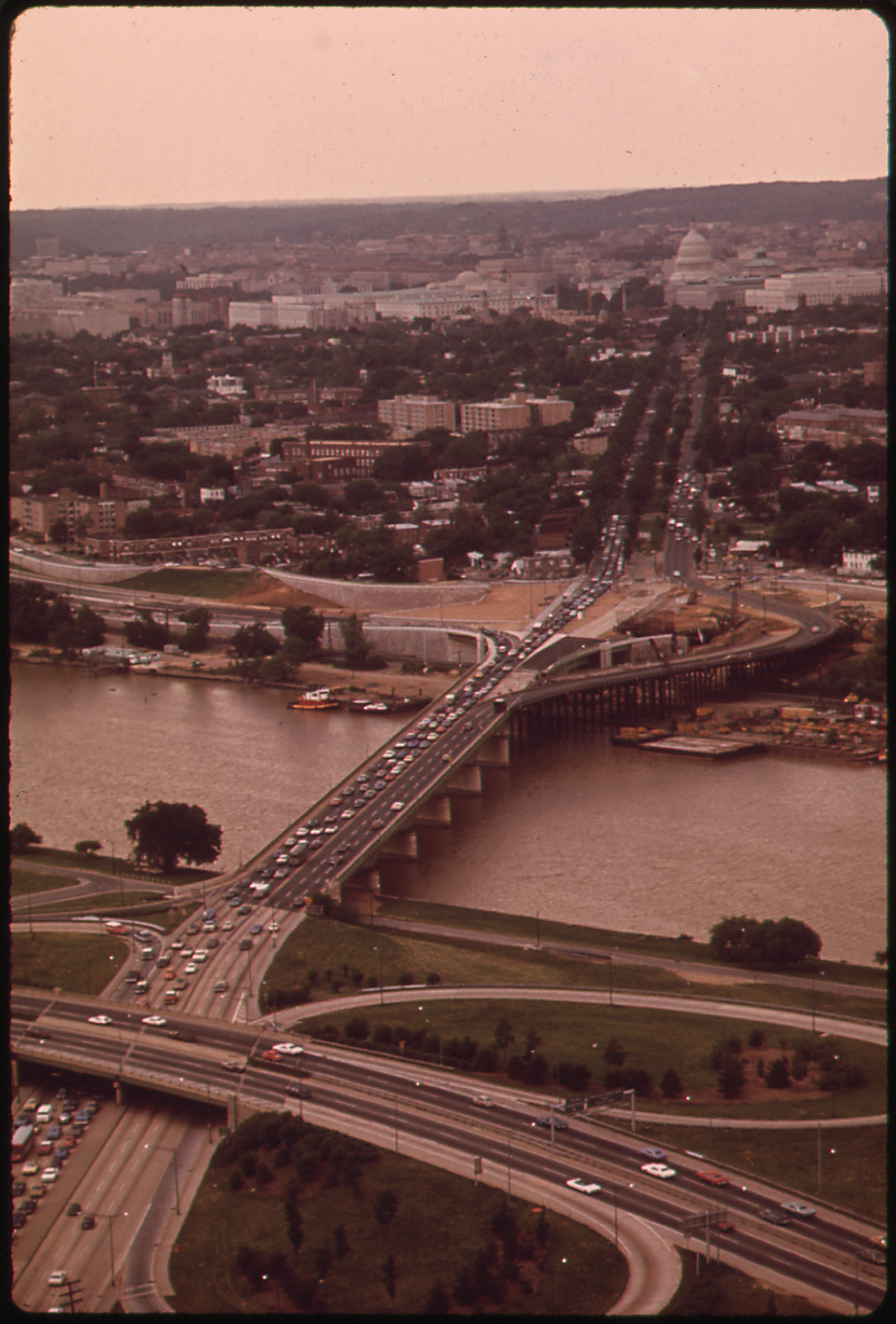
The John Philip Sousa Bridge in 1973, with Barney Circle on the far side of the bridge and the Anacostia Freeway interchange in the foreground

In 1956, federal and regional transportation planners proposed an Inner Loop Expressway composed of three circumferential beltways for the District of Columbia. The innermost beltway would have formed a flattened oval about a mile in radius centered on the White House. The middle beltway would have formed an arc along the northern portion of the city, running from the proposed Barney Circle Freeway (whose terminus would have been near Robert F. Kennedy Memorial Stadium) through Anacostia Park, cutting northwest through the Trinidad neighborhood along Mt. Olivet Road NE, following the Amtrak rail line north to Missouri Avenue NW, along Missouri Avenue NW to Military Road NW, along Military Road NW across Rock Creek Park to Nebraska Avenue NW, down Nebraska Avenue NW to New Mexico Avenue NW, and down New Mexico Avenue NW and across Glover-Archbold Park until it terminated near 37th Street NW at the north end of Georgetown. As part of this plan, Barney Circle was again rebuilt in 1971, now with freeway ramps leading to the Southeast/Southwest Freeway and the John Philip Sousa Bridge. Two decades of protest led to the cancellation of all but the Interstate 395 and Interstate 695 portions of the plan. The unbuilt portions of the project were finally cancelled in 1977.

The failure to complete the Inner Loop left the Sousa Bridge's approaches incomplete and confusing. The bus and streetcar terminal were removed, and Pennsylvania Avenue SE now ran directly through the center of the circle. M Street was disconnected from the circle, and now dead-ended in a roundabout a block east of 12th Street SE. Unmarked Interstate 695 delivered three lanes of traffic to a one-lane on-ramp to the bridge, and traffic backed up for miles every day as a traffic light allowed only a few cars onto the bridge's southbound lanes during rush hour. Four lanes of traffic (two northbound, two southbound) passed beneath the bridge's terminus, dead-ending at a non-existent Inner Loop and connected haphazardly to the northeastern side of the circle. An off-ramp delivered most northbound bridge traffic around the incomplete Barney Circle and under the bridge onto Interstate 695 westbound. A dangerous right-hand turn with no deceleration ramp left local traffic coming to a swift halt to access 17th Street SE — but not Kentucky Avenue SE, which now had to be accessed from local streets. K Street SE now curved north and east around the west side of Barney Circle, and traffic lights on the street caused even more backups both on K Street and on the Sousa Bridge.

=== Barney Circle Freeway fight ===
In 1975, federal, regional, and city transportation planners proposed an extension to I-695/Southeast Freeway to be called the "Barney Circle Freeway" to help alleviate the problems created by the failure to complete the Inner Loop. The freeway would extend I-695 past its existing terminus at Barney Circle and travel along the western bank of the Anacostia River (through Anacostia Park) to East Capitol Street and Robert F. Kennedy Memorial Stadium. A new bridge over the Anacostia River at Burnham Barrier would provide vehicles easy access to the Anacostia Freeway. The Barney Circle Freeway would have delinked Barney Circle from I-695, and reconstructed the on- and off-ramps to Sousa Bridge so that the bridge returned to its traditional function as a local bridge rather than a route for commuters to access the Anacostia Freeway and points east in the state of Maryland. The combined bridge and freeway project was ready for construction to begin in 1981, and its cost was estimated to be $93.5 million. But after protests from residents of Capitol Hill (who feared the Barney Circle Freeway would cause more traffic to flow into the area) as well as environmentalists, the District of Columbia agreed to reduce the number of lanes on the Barney Circle Freeway to two from four.

The protests and legal and regulatory challenges to the proposed freeway did not end, however, and by 1992 the freeway's cost had ballooned to $160 million and it remained unbuilt. By 1993, although costs for the project had increased to $200 million, D.C. Mayor Sharon Pratt Kelly gave her approval for construction to begin. But construction was delayed yet again when the Sierra Club Legal Defense Fund, Anacostia Watershed Society, Committee of 100 on the Federal City, Citizens Committee to Stop It Again, D.C. Federation of Civic Associations, Friends of the Earth, Kingman Park Civic Association, the Barney Circle Neighborhood Watch, Urban Protectors, and American Rivers sued to force the city to scale back the freeway even further, add exit ramps at the junction of Pennsylvania Avenue SE and I-695, and alter traffic patterns (e.g., creating more one-way streets) on Capitol Hill. Federal Highway Administration (FHWA) officials agreed in August 1994 to conduct an additional environmental impact assessment regarding the project, but later said the assessment's findings did not alter its earlier conclusion that construction of the roadway and bridge project was economically feasible, technologically appropriate, and environmentally sound. However, the D.C. City Council had the final say on whether to proceed with the project or not. In December 1994, the City Council bowed to neighborhood opposition and voted overwhelmingly to reject the project.

=== Restructuring of Barney Circle ===
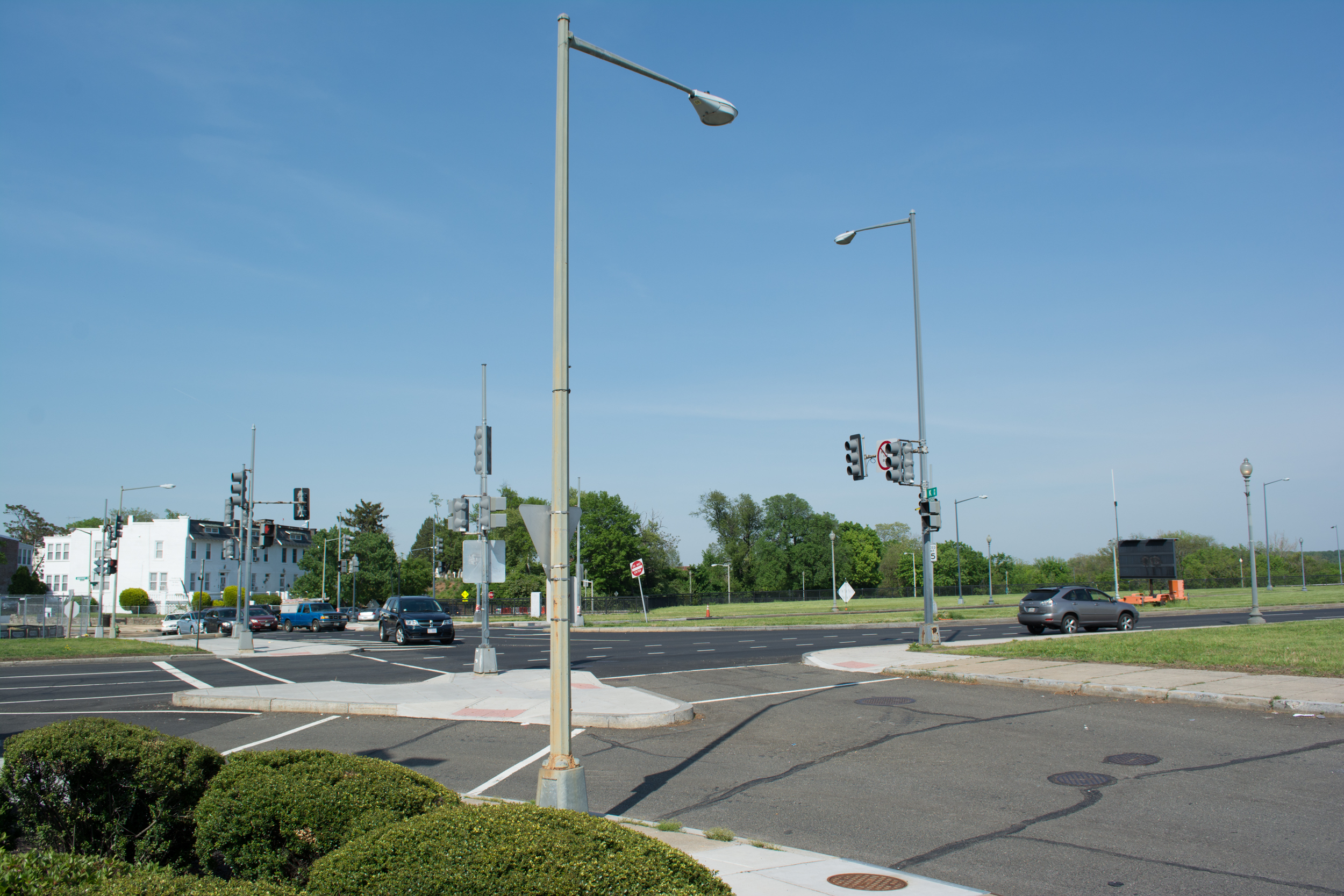
Standing on K Street SE, looking north-northeast at Barney Circle. Pennsylvania Avenue SE southbound is cutting across the image left to right. The traffic attempting to access Pennsylvania Avenue SE is on Barney Circle SE, part of the traffic circle itself.

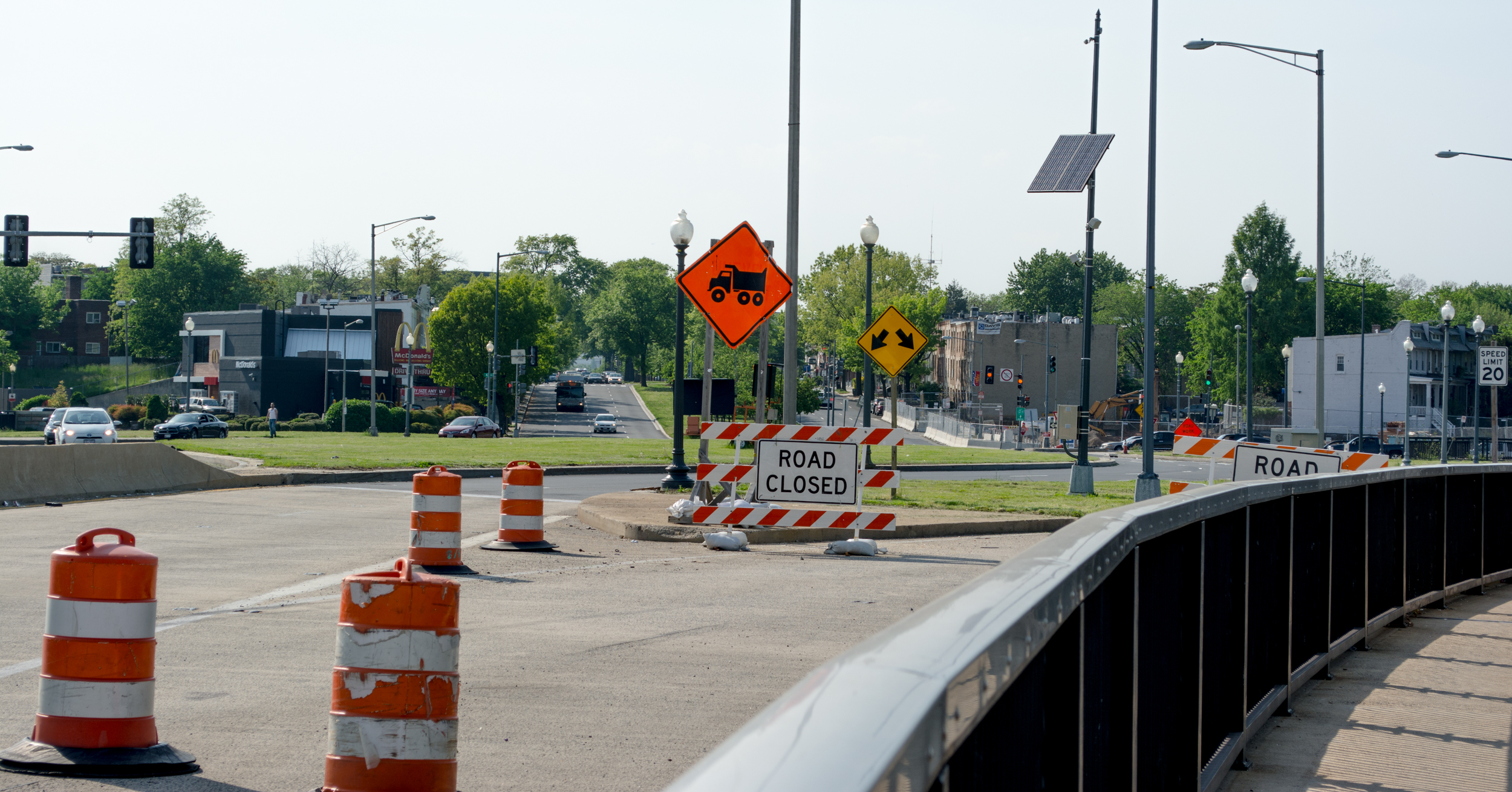
Looking northwest from Sousa Bridge in May 2014 at the then closed off-ramp to Interstate 695, and at Barney Circle. Traffic is approaching Barney Circle in the distance on southbound Pennsylvania Avenue SE.

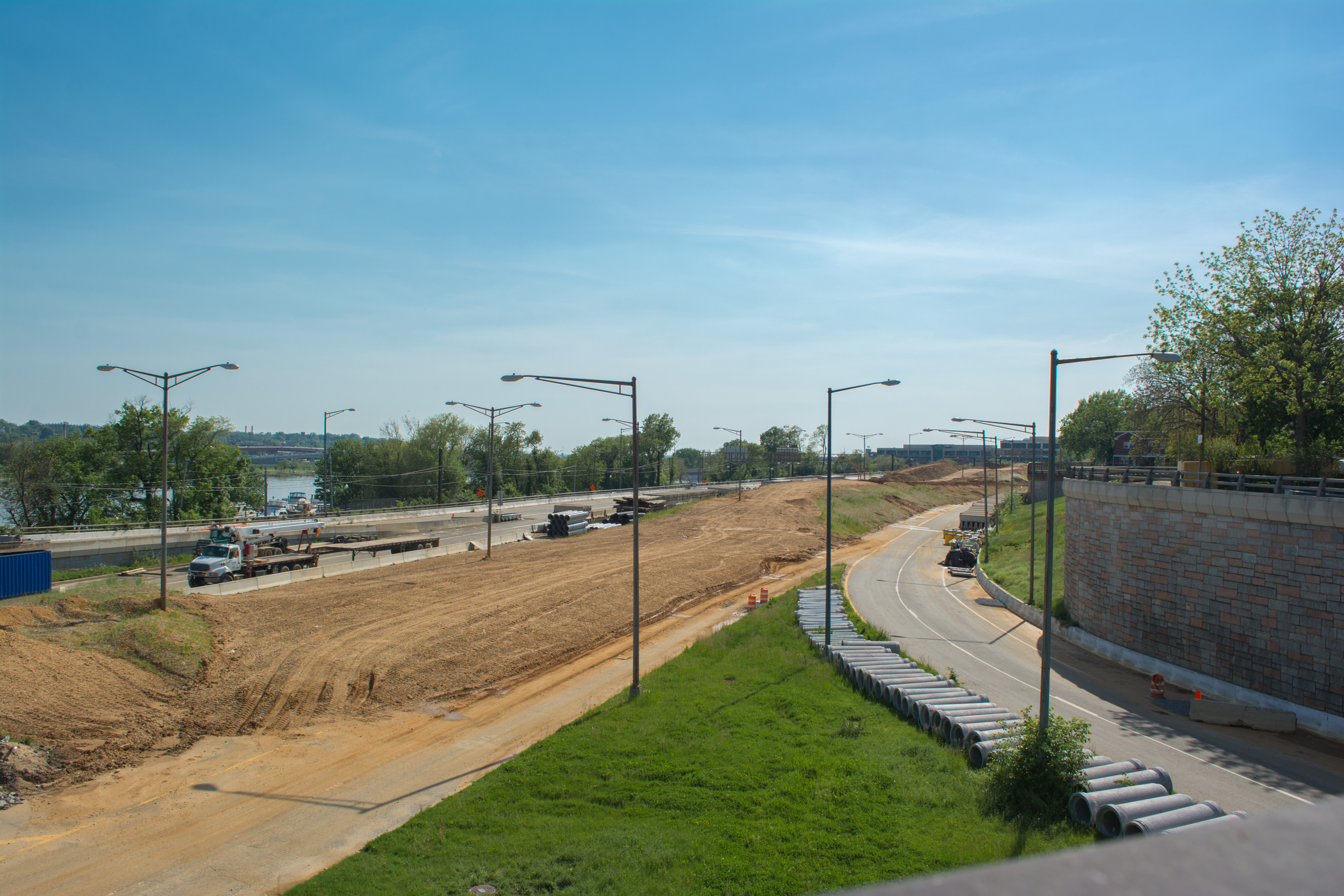
Looking southwest from Barney Circle at decommissioned Interstate 695. The roadway is being torn up and the road bed raised by 20 feet to create a new road to be named "Southeast Boulevard". The now-closed on-ramp from Pennsylvania Avenue SE can be seen to the left.

Since the cancellation of the Inner Loop Expressway, motorists wanting to access the Baltimore–Washington Parkway or U.S. Route 50 in Maryland (the John Hanson Highway) would often travel Interstate 695 to Barney Circle, wait at the traffic light there, cross the Sousa Bridge, wait at a traffic light on the southwestern terminus of the bridge, and make a left turn against oncoming traffic to access a narrow and dangerous ramp that led to northbound D.C. Route 295 (the Anacostia Freeway). The combination of traffic lights, left turn, and mixing of both through-traffic and local traffic created extensive traffic congestion on the Sousa Bridge during evening rush hour.

In 2009, the District of Columbia Department of Transportation (DDOT) began the replacement of the 11th Street Bridges. It closed the westbound segment of Interstate 695 from the 11th Street Bridges to Barney Circle in late November 2012, and the eastbound lanes in early 2013. This portion of was Interstate 695 was subsequently decommissioned, turning roughly five blocks of six-lane highway into city streets from the National Highway System. The unfinished "mixing bowl" exchange on the southern terminus of the 11th Street Bridges was also altered. Local traffic was separated from through-traffic by the construction of a bridge dedicated for local traffic only, and ramps connecting the bridge to D.C. Route 295 were created. Construction of the new ramps began in May 2012, with the ramp from southbound D.C. Route 295 onto the 11th Street Bridge completed in July 2012. The ramp from the bridges to northbound D.C. Route 295 opened on December 19, 2012.

These changes removed a significant portion of the traffic using Sousa Bridge, from 50,000 vehicles per day (each way) in 2004 to an estimated 35,000 vehicles per day (each way) in 2030. DDOT also redesigned and rebuilt the ramp from Pennsylvania Avenue SE to northbound D.C. Route 295 to improve its safety.

Decommissioned Interstate 695 began to be transformed into a boulevard named "Southeast Boulevard". The reconstruction project, estimated to take 18 to 24 months, raised the roadway 20 feet (6.1 m) to bring it level with the grade of the surrounding streets. The six-lane former highway began to be turned into a four-lane grand boulevard with a landscaped median and pedestrian nature trail. Southeast Boulevard was designed to link Barney Circle to 11th Street SE.

In 2013, DDOT published plans to reconfigure Barney Circle. Priorities for the project included improving and restoring access to neighborhood streets, and adding pedestrian and bicycle connectivity to local streets and the Anacostia River waterfront. DDOT also began exploring whether to connect Southeast Boulevard to 12th, 13th, 14th, and 15th Streets SE. By 2014, DDOT's plan involved possible reconstructing of Barney Circle into an intermodal transportation hub as well. DDOT planners said that construction on this project might begin as early as 2016, but as of 2017 no work is planned.

== Bibliography ==
- Corps of Engineers (1911). Annual Reports, War Department, Fiscal Year Ended June 30, 1911. Report of the Chief of Engineers, U.S. Army, 1911. Part III. Washington, D.C.: Department of the Army.
- District of Columbia Department of Transportation (November 21, 2013). Barney Circle and Southeast Boulevard Transportation Planning Study (PDF) (Report). Washington, D.C.: D.C. Department of Transportation. Archived from the original (PDF) on April 29, 2014.
- District of Columbia Department of Transportation (March 6, 2014). Projects Update Meeting For Ward 7 (PDF) (Report). Washington, D.C.: D.C. Department of Transportation.
- Hayward, Mary Ellen; Belfoure, Charles (1999). The Baltimore Rowhouse. New York: Princeton Architectural Press. ISBN 9781568981772.
- "Memorial to Congress of the Columbia Historical Society". Records of the Columbia Historical Society, Washington, D.C. 1911.
- Mohl, Raymond A. (2008). "The Interstates and the Cities: The U.S. Department of Transportation and the Freeway Revolt, 1966-1973". Journal of Policy History. 20 (2): 193–226. doi:10.1353/jph.0.0014. S2CID 154486374.
- Proctor, John Claggett; Black, Frank P.; Williams, E. Melvin (1930). Washington, Past and Present: A History. New York: Lewis Historical Publishing Co.
- Schrag, Zachary M. (July 2004). "The Freeway Fight in Washington, D.C.: The Three Sisters Bridge in Three Administrations". Journal of Urban History: 648–673. doi:10.1177/0096144204265171. S2CID 144196119.
