= Inner Loop (Washington, D.C.) =

Proposed loop in the District of Columbia area

Coordinates: 38°52′56.1″N 77°1′30.4″W

- Proposed Inner Beltway corridor highlighted in red, proposed Middle Beltway corridor in blue

Route information
- Existed: 1956–1977

Location
- Country: United States
- Federal district: District of Columbia

Highway system
- Streets and Highways of Washington, DC; Interstate; US; DC; State-Named Streets

The Inner Loop was two planned freeways around downtown Washington, D.C. The innermost loop would have formed an oval centered on the White House, with a central freeway connecting the southern segment to the northern segment and then continuing on to Interstate 95. Interstate 95 would have met Interstate 66, Interstate 295, Interstate 695, and US 50 while traversing the Inner Loop. A second loop was an arc across the northern section of the city, beginning at East Capitol Street at the Anacostia River and using the Missouri Avenue NW and Nebraska Avenue NW commercial corridors to terminate in Georgetown.

== History and proposed loops ==
In 1956, federal and regional transportation planners proposed an Inner Loop Expressway composed of three circumferential beltways for the District of Columbia. The majority of the innermost loop would have been a minimum of six lanes, with the portions used by I-95 having a minimum of eight lanes. The final design for the innermost loop made heavy use of cut-and-cover tunnels in order to minimize impacts to the city; one notable example that was built is the tunnel under the National Mall, between C Street SW and D Street NW, used by Interstate 395.

The innermost beltway would have formed a flattened oval centered on the Kennedy Center/Watergate complex in the west, running southeast along what is currently Ohio Drive SW until it linked with the Southwest Freeway portion of I-395, north along I-395 to L Street NW, and then west along a tunnel beneath K Street NW to join near the western nexus with the Whitehurst Freeway and Interstate 66—completing the loop.

The middle beltway would have formed an arc along the northern portion of the city, running from the proposed Barney Circle Freeway (whose terminus would have been near Robert F. Kennedy Memorial Stadium) through Anacostia Park, cut northeast through the Trinidad neighborhood along Mt. Olivet Road NE, followed the Amtrak rail line north to Missouri Avenue NW, along Missouri Avenue NW to Military Road NW, along Military Road NW across Rock Creek Park to Nebraska Avenue NW, down Nebraska Avenue NW to New Mexico Avenue NW, down New Mexico Avenue NW and across Glover-Archbold Park until it terminated near 37th Street NW at the north end of Georgetown.

The outermost route, the Capital Beltway, would encircle the city of Washington.

D.C. residents strongly opposed both inner loops, upset that the freeways would have required the demolition of large numbers of houses and greatly affected city neighborhoods. As a result, all portions of the network that were not yet started were completely canceled in 1977. This left some portions of the innermost loop incomplete, and the northern arc completely unbuilt. Funding for the Inner Loop was partially reallocated toward construction of the Washington Metro.

=== Built portions ===
- Southwest Freeway (Interstate 395, originally signed Interstate 95) from the 14th Street Bridge to the Southeast Freeway (Interstate 695)
- Southeast Freeway (Interstate 695) from Interstate 395 past the 11th Street Bridges to Pennsylvania Avenue SE
- Interstate 395 from the junction of the Southwest and Southeast Freeways to New York Avenue
- Interstate 66 from the Theodore Roosevelt Bridge to the Whitehurst Freeway

=== Unbuilt portions ===
- Interstate 66 from the District border to the junction of the Whitehurst Freeway and the unbuilt tunnel under K Street NW
- The underground freeway under K Street NW from its junction with the Whitehurst Freeway east to its junction with Interstate 395
- Interstate 66 from the Theodore Roosevelt Bridge along Ohio Drive SW to the Southwest Freeway near the 14th Street Bridge
- Interstate 266, an upgrade of Spout Run Parkway which would cross the Potomac River at a proposed Three Sisters Bridge, and down an expanded Canal Road NW to join the Whitehurst Freeway
- An interchange at the junction of the 11th Street Bridges and I-295/Anacostia Freeway to permit southbound and northbound traffic to directly access the interstate
- An extension of I-695 (the so-called "Barney Circle Freeway") from its current terminus through Anacostia Park, to cross Burnham Barrier and connect with the Anacostia Freeway
- An upgrade of New York Avenue from the proposed junction with I-395 to the junction of New York Avenue/U.S. Route 50 with I-295, known as the New York Industrial Freeway

== See also ==
- Washington Outer Beltway, a proposed loop outside the Capital Beltway
- Spadina Expressway a proposed expressway killed by citizen opposition in Toronto, Canada.
