= List of Interstate Highways in Washington, D.C. =

Interstate Highways of the District of Columbia
- Highway markers

System information
- Formed: August 14, 1957

Highway names
- Interstates: Interstate X (I-X)

System links
- Streets and Highways of Washington, DC; Interstate; US; DC; State-Named Streets

In Washington, D.C., there are two current primary Interstate Highways and four current auxiliary Interstates. In addition, two proposed primary Interstates and two proposed auxiliary Interstates were cancelled in whole or in part.

Interstate 495, also known as the "Capital Beltway", creates an artificial boundary for the inner suburbs of Washington and is the root of the phrase "Inside the Beltway". Almost completely circling Washington, D.C., it crosses a tiny portion of the District at its southernmost point at the Woodrow Wilson Bridge. I-66 runs from the eastern edge of Georgetown, connects with the Beltway, and continues through Northern Virginia to I-81. I-295 comes up from the south starting at the eastern edge of the Woodrow Wilson Bridge on the Beltway and crosses the Anacostia River into downtown, linking up with I-395 (the Southwest Freeway), a major commuter route extending from New York Avenue to the Beltway and Interstate 95 in Springfield, Virginia, via I-695 (the Southeast Freeway). The Inner Loop was a proposed network of freeways in the city center; however, only portions of it were ever built. Today, the "inner loop" is most frequently used to describe the inside lanes of 495. That is those that travel clockwise around Washington.

== Interstate Highways ==
Number	Length (mi)	Length (km)	Southern or western terminus	Northern or eastern terminus	Formed	Removed	Notes
I-66	1.48	2.38	Theodore Roosevelt Bridge (I-66 / US 50) in Arlington, VA	Whitehurst Freeway (US 29) in Foggy Bottom	1977	current	Theodore Roosevelt Bridge, Potomac River Freeway
I-70S	—	—	—	—	—	1975	Part of the planned North Central Freeway; Maryland portion was renamed I-270 in 1975
I-95	—	—	—	—	1961	1977	Plans to run I-95 through downtown Washington via the planned Inner Loop and North Central Freeway were scrapped, prompting I-95 to replace I-495 along the eastern half of the Capital Beltway. Portions built were re-designated I-395.
I-95	0.11	0.18	Woodrow Wilson Bridge (VA–DC–MD border)		1977	current	No boundary crossing signage; concurrent with I-495 since 1991
I-195	1.90	3.06	Southwest Freeway / 3rd Street Tunnel (I-395) in Southwest Federal Center	New York Avenue NW (US 50) in Mount Vernon Square	proposed	—	Will replace I-395 through the Third Street Tunnel
I-266	1.79	2.88	—	—	—	1972	Proposed loop route of I-66 between the District, and Arlington County, but canceled in the face of community opposition during Washington's "freeway revolts;" D.C. officials proposed designating the route Interstate 66N, a move opposed by the AASHTO.
I-270	—	—	—	—	1975	1977	Part of the planned North Central Freeway; Maryland portion was known as I-70S until in 1975
I-295	7.25	11.67	Anacostia Freeway (I-295) in Oxon Hill, MD	Anacostia Freeway (DC 295) / 11th Street Bridges (I-695) in Anacostia	1964	current	Anacostia Freeway (south of the 11th Street Bridges)
I-395	3.48	5.60	14th Street Bridges (I-395 / US 1) in Arlington, VA	New York Avenue NW (US 50) in Mount Vernon Square	1977	current	14th Street Bridges, Southwest Freeway, 3rd Street Tunnel
I-495	0.11	0.18	Woodrow Wilson Bridge (VA–DC–MD border)		1991	current	Previously existed 1961–1977, reinstated 1991; no boundary crossing signage; concurrent with I-95
I-695	2.00	3.22	Southwest Freeway / 3rd Street Tunnel (I-395) in Southwest Federal Center	Anacostia Freeway (I-295 / DC 295) in Fairlawn	1961	current	Southeast Freeway, 11th Street Bridges; signage bearing I-695 shields were added in 2011; will be replaced by an extension of I-395
Former
