= Douglass Community Land Trust =

American land trust

The Douglass Community Land Trust (DCLT) is a land trust to create community-based affordable housing effort in Washington, D.C., was incorporated in September 2019 in conjunction with the proposed 11th Street Bridge Park development along the Anacostia River.

== Neighborhood development ==
In March 2012, the Office of Planning within the D.C. Mayor's office derived inspiration from the High Line in New York City to retain the downstream span of the 11th Street Bridge and turning it into a recreational destination. Developers and the city envisioned a community space with high-end amenities including a public plaza, amphitheater, environmental education center.

The project will link Anacostia and Capitol Hill, two D.C. neighborhoods with stark disparity. According to the park’s Equitable Development Plan, neighborhoods in the Capitol Hill area have 23.4 percent black residents and a median owner-occupied home value of $777,000, while east of the river in Anacostia the population is 92.4 percent black and median home value is $329,500. The connections of these areas led to concern among architects, developers, and neighborhood residents who feared the gentrification in surrounding areas similar to the High Line. A 2019 study stated that the District is currently experiencing the highest, “intensity of gentrification,” of American cities.

Community members and other stakeholders in the Bridge Park created an Equitable Development Plan which outlines recommendations to limit displacement. Goals of the plan fall into four categories—workforce development, small business enterprises, housing, and arts and culture. Housing goals (in addition to the Douglass CLT) include educating current residents on legal and financial assistance programs for home buying as well as securing increased philanthropic funding for affordable housing programs.

== Land trust ==
In 2017 community members, and public representatives came together to begin the creation of a land trust that would work towards establishing affordable housing in the area. City First Enterprises worked with the advisory committee to provide resources, credibility, and transparency. In September of that year, the land trust made their first purchases of land to build a single-family homes and sold to families earning less than 50 percent of the area median income (under $61,000 for a four-person family). The trust raised $550,000 from Citi and JP Morgan Chase.

In September 2019, the trust was incorporated and is governed by a board made up of residents, other community members, and public representatives.

As of October 2019, the DCLT was finalizing its first purchase—this one of Savannah Apartments, a 65-unit building in Congress Heights.
