= List of numbered highways in Washington, D.C. =

District of Columbia Routes
- Standard markers for highways in the District of Columbia

Highway names
- Interstates: Interstate X (I-X)
- US Highways: U.S. Route X (US X)
- State: District of Columbia Route X (DC X)

System links
- Streets and Highways of Washington, DC; Interstate; US; DC; State-Named Streets

District of Columbia Routes are numbered highways maintained by the District of Columbia's District Department of Transportation (DDOT). In addition to these routes, there are several Interstate and United States Numbered highways that pass through Washington, D.C. The metro area is also served by three unnumbered, federally maintained parkways: the Clara Barton Parkway, the Rock Creek and Potomac Parkway, and the George Washington Memorial Parkway (the latter on the west side of the Potomac River, but a portion of it is east of the Boundary Channel).

== List of routes ==
The chart below consists of all District of Columbia Routes, including signed routes that no longer traverse the District of Columbia.

| Number | Length (mi) | Length (km) | Southern or western terminus | Northern or eastern terminus | Formed | Removed | Notes |
|---|---|---|---|---|---|---|---|
| DC 4 | — | — | — | — | — | — | Pennsylvania Avenue was designated DC 4, an extension of Maryland Route 4 that reached at least the east side of the White House. |
| DC 5 | — | — | — | — | 1939 | 1949 | Continued into Washington, D.C. on Naylor Road, Good Hope Road, and 11th Street to District of Columbia Route 4 (Pennsylvania Avenue). MD 5 was directed to follow Branch Avenue to the D.C. border and DC 5 was modified to follow Branch Avenue from the Maryland border to DC 4 (Pennsylvania Avenue), which it followed west to the White House, by 1946. |
| DC 295 | 4.29 | 6.90 | Anacostia Freeway (DC 295) / 11th Street Bridges (I-695) in Anacostia | Kenilworth Avenue Freeway (MD 201) near Capitol Heights, MD | 1964 | current | Anacostia Freeway (north of the 11th Street Bridges), Kenilworth Avenue Freeway |
Former
