= Capitol Street =

Capitol Street can refer to three separate streets in Washington, D.C, United States:

- East Capitol Street
- South Capitol Street
- North Capitol Street
