= Anacostia Freeway =

The Anacostia Freeway is a freeway in the U.S. state of Maryland and the District of Columbia. It follows:

- Interstate 295 (Maryland–District of Columbia), a spur route connecting I-95/I-495 and Maryland Route 210 (Indian Head Highway) near the Potomac River to I-695 in DC
- District of Columbia Route 295, a freeway in the District of Columbia
