= Interstate 695 (District of Columbia) =

Highway in Washington, D.C.

Interstate 695
- Southeast Freeway
- I-695 highlighted in red

Route information
- Maintained by DDOT
- Length: 2 mi (3.2 km)
- Existed: 1958–present
- NHS: Entire route

Major junctions
- West end: I-395 in Washington, DC
- East end: I-295 / DC 295 in Washington, DC

Location
- Country: United States
- Federal district: District of Columbia

Highway system
- Interstate Highway System; Main; Auxiliary; Suffixed; Business; Future; Streets and Highways of Washington, DC; Interstate; US; DC; State-Named Streets
← I-495	→ US 1

Interstate 695 (I-695), also known as the Southeast Freeway, is a two-mile-long (3.2 km) auxiliary Interstate Highway in Washington, D.C. It travels from an interchange with I-395 south of the US Capitol building east then south across the 11th Street Bridges to an interchange with I-295 and District of Columbia Route 295 (DC 295) in Anacostia.

Access also exists from eastbound I-695 to Pennsylvania Avenue at Barney Circle, just northwest of the John Philip Sousa Bridge. Stub ramps at Pennsylvania Avenue, once meant to continue the freeway (as part of I-295) to I-95 and US Route 50 (US 50) northeast of Washington Union Station, provided access to Robert F. Kennedy Memorial Stadium until September 2019 when it was demolished.

Though the I-695 designation has existed since near the birth of the Interstate Highway System, the route was only signed in late 2011 along with the 11th Street Bridges reconstruction project. The route number is planned to be decommissioned in favor of an extension of the I-395 designation, but the resigning work is yet to commence as of September 2025.

== Route description ==
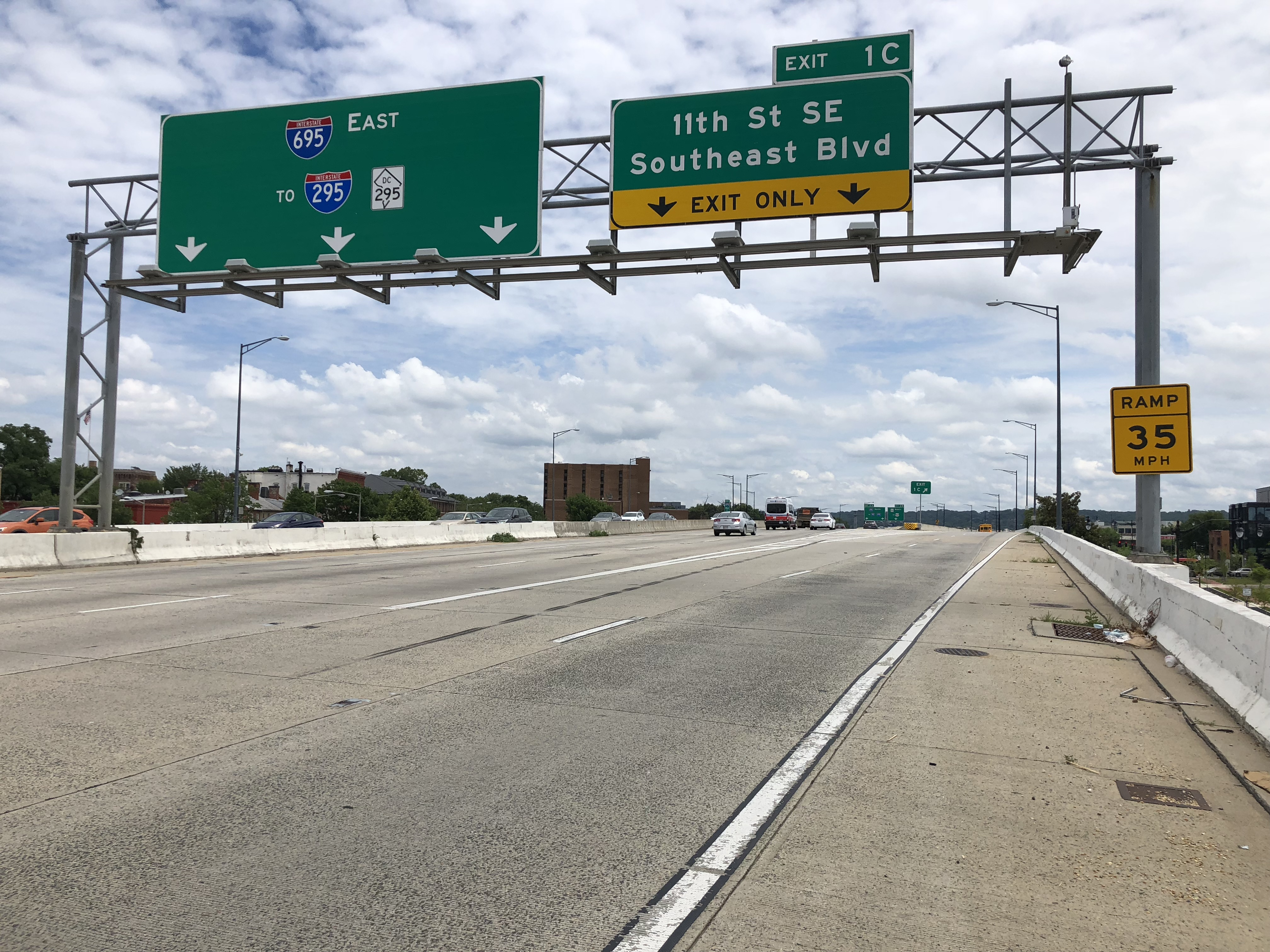
I-695 eastbound at exit 1C

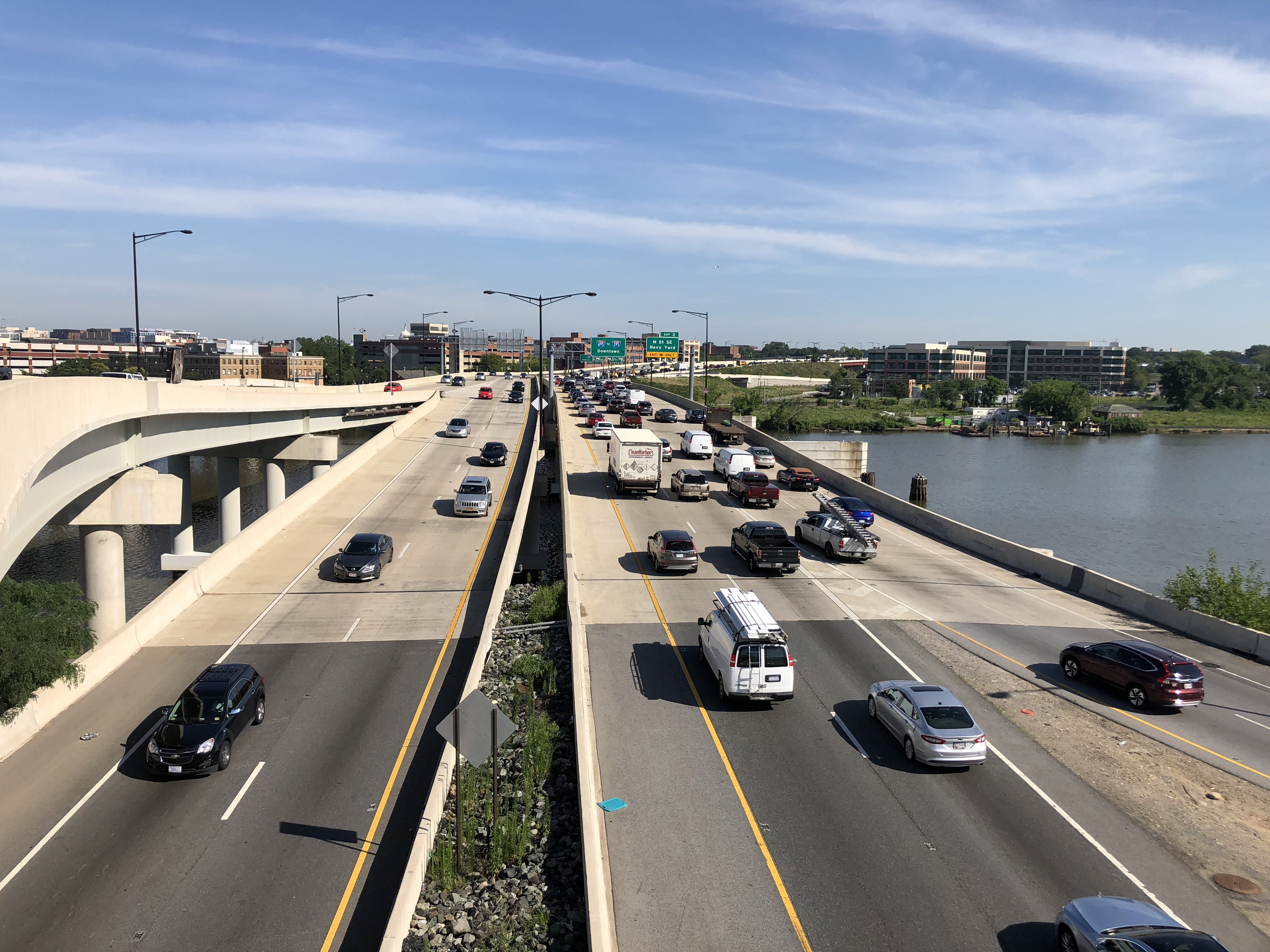
View west at the east end of I-695 at I-295 and DC 295

I-695 begins at an interchange with I-395, following through the densely populated areas of Washington DC. The road comes to an interchange with South Capitol Street, providing access to the Nationals Park baseball stadium. It then continues east, passing over 6th Street Southeast. The Interstate comes to another interchange, providing access to I-395 north (westbound only) and 11th Street and Southeast Boulevard (eastbound). It then proceeds to cross the 11th Street Bridges over the Anacostia River before reaching its terminus at I-295 and DC 295.

== History ==
Plans from 1955 (numbered in 1958) took I-95 through Washington on what is now I-395, turning east at US 50 and leaving along the Baltimore–Washington Parkway. I-295 was to travel along its current route to south of the 11th Street Bridges, but then would have continued northeast along DC 295, ending at I-95 just outside DC. I-695 was to travel from I-295 over the 11th Street Bridges, turning west on what is now I-695 to end at I-95 (now I-395).

Soon—possibly by 1958, when numbers were assigned—I-95 between Baltimore, Maryland, and Washington DC was shifted to a new alignment, splitting from the US 50 corridor northeast of Washington Union Station. I-295 was shifted to cross the 11th Street Bridges and then turn east in the median of present I-695 (where the ramps to Robert F. Kennedy Memorial Stadium now lie), continuing north and northwest to end at I-95 and US 50 at their split. I-695 would be the short section of freeway between I-95 and I-295, and ramps on both sides of the Whitney Young Memorial Bridge would provide a freeway-to-freeway connection between I-695 and DC 295 (via I-295).

By 1971, an extension was added to the planned I-695. It would travel concurrent with I-95 west to Maine Avenue, where it would split (the existing interchange provides for freeway-to-freeway ramps) and run northwest in a tunnel to end at I-66, at the east end of the Theodore Roosevelt Bridge (that interchange also has the appropriate ramps). Though this was never built, an I-695 South sign remained on I-66 westbound at the planned location of the terminus, covered with plywood, until its removal in 2018.

The Southeast Freeway, including the section planned as I-295 to Pennsylvania Avenue, was built in the late 1960s. Plans for the remaining Interstates in Washington DC were canceled in 1977 after much opposition, and I-295 was later truncated to I-695, with the former I-295 stub to Pennsylvania Avenue renumbered as part of I-695.

In the 1990s, the Barney Circle Freeway was planned to travel from the east end of I-695 across the Anacostia River to DC 295. This would have filled a hole in Washington DC's freeway system, which had no connection between I-395 and DC 295. (This would have been provided by I-295 and the Whitney Young Memorial Bridge.) After the Barney Circle Freeway plan was canceled in 1996, a left-turn movement was added at the interchange between Pennsylvania Avenue and DC 295, allowing traffic coming from I-695 to cross the Anacostia on Pennsylvania Avenue and join DC 295 directly, albeit passing through two traffic signals. No ramp was provided from DC 295 south to Pennsylvania Avenue west, however, and so traffic from DC 295 south to I-395 south needed to cross the Anacostia on South Capitol Street.

That decommissioning was foretold in April 2003, when the DC Office of Planning stated that "the elevated Southeast Freeway and industrial landscape create formidable psychological barriers" between the surrounding neighborhoods. In October 2008, the freeway was named one of ten US "Freeways Without Futures" by Congress for the New Urbanism.

In December 2009, construction began on replacement of the 11th Street Bridges and their interchange with I-295/DC 295, including ramps that now allow for highway-only travel between DC 295, I-295, and I-395 in all directions. The renderings for that project also show a deletion of the connections between the bridge and I-695 east, indicating that the stretch of the Southeast Freeway between 11th Street Southeast and Pennsylvania Avenue would soon be decommissioned and replaced by an at-grade boulevard with traffic signals. In 2011, as a part of the project, I-695 was signed along the Southeast Freeway.

Prior to the 11th Street Bridge Project, the unsigned I-695 did not cross the bridges and terminated north of the Anacostia River. New signage installed by the District Department of Transportation (DDOT) in 2011–2012 marks the first time I-695 has appeared on directional signs in the District of Columbia; some signs referring to I-695, however, still read "To I-295" along I-395, and some remaining "To I-395" signage can still be found along I-695 westbound. The new signs designate I-695 as extending from the point where I-395 branches off from the Southeast Freeway, with I-695 continuing along the Southeast Freeway and over the new 11th Street Bridge to the interchange with I-295. Some commentators contend the new signage is confusing and that the Southeast Freeway is often confused with Baltimore's Beltway, a highway with the same route designation.

In January 2021, as part of an effort to eliminate driver confusion in the area of the Center Leg Freeway, the American Association of State Highway and Transportation Officials (AASHTO) approved a request by the District of Columbia to eliminate the I-695 designation and renumber it as an extension of I-395. I-395's previous route along the Center Leg Freeway will be renumbered as a new I-195. The Federal Highway Administration (FHWA) approved the request of resigning I-695 as I-395 on April 23, 2021; though some printed and digital maps have made the change, no progress was made in physical re-signing as of October 2024.

== Exit list ==
Exits were unnumbered until July 2014. The entire route is in Washington, D.C.

Location	mi	km	Exit	Destinations	Notes
Southwest Federal Center– Southwest Waterfront line	0.00	0.00	—	I-395 north (3rd Street Tunnel)	Western terminus; exit 7 on I-395; future I-195
Southwest Federal Center– Southwest Waterfront line	0.00	0.00	—	D Street SW	Westbound exit and eastbound entrance
Southwest Federal Center– Southwest Waterfront line	0.00	0.00	—	I-395 south – Richmond	Westbound exit and eastbound entrance; exit 5 on I-395
Southwest Federal Center– Southwest Waterfront line	0.30	0.48	1A	South Capitol Street – Nationals Park	Eastbound exit and westbound entrance
Capitol Hill– Navy Yard line	0.90	1.45	1B	6th Street SE	Eastbound exit and westbound entrance
Capitol Hill– Navy Yard line			1C	To I-395 north – Baltimore	Westbound exit and entrance
Capitol Hill– Navy Yard line	1.50	2.41	1C	11th Street SE / Southeast Boulevard	Eastbound exit and westbound entrance; opened July 2014
Capitol Hill– Navy Yard line	1.60	2.57	1D	8th Street SE	Westbound exit and eastbound entrance
Navy Yard	1.80	2.90	2	M Street SE – Navy Yard	Westbound exit and eastbound entrance
Anacostia River	1.90	3.06	11th Street Bridges		
Fairlawn	2.00	3.22	2	I-295 south / DC 295 north to I-95 / I-495 / US 50	Eastern terminus; signed as exits 2A (south) and 2B (north)
1.000 mi = 1.609 km; 1.000 km = 0.621 mi: Incomplete access
