= District of Columbia Route 295 =

Highway in the District of Columbia

District of Columbia Route 295
- DC 295 highlighted in red

Route information
- Maintained by District of Columbia DOT
- Length: 4.29 mi (6.90 km)

Major junctions
- South end: I-295 / I-695 in Washington
- North end: MD 201 at the Maryland state line

Location
- Country: United States
- Federal district: District of Columbia

Highway system
- Streets and Highways of Washington, DC; Interstate; US; DC; State-Named Streets
← I-295	→ I-395

District of Columbia Route 295 (DC 295) is a freeway in Washington, D.C. Composed of two segments, the Anacostia Freeway and the Kenilworth Avenue Freeway, it is the only numbered District of Columbia Route. The south end is at an interchange with I-295, I-695, and the southern end of the 11th Street Bridges. Its north end is at the border with Maryland where it becomes MD 201, connecting to the Baltimore–Washington Parkway and US 50.

== Route description ==
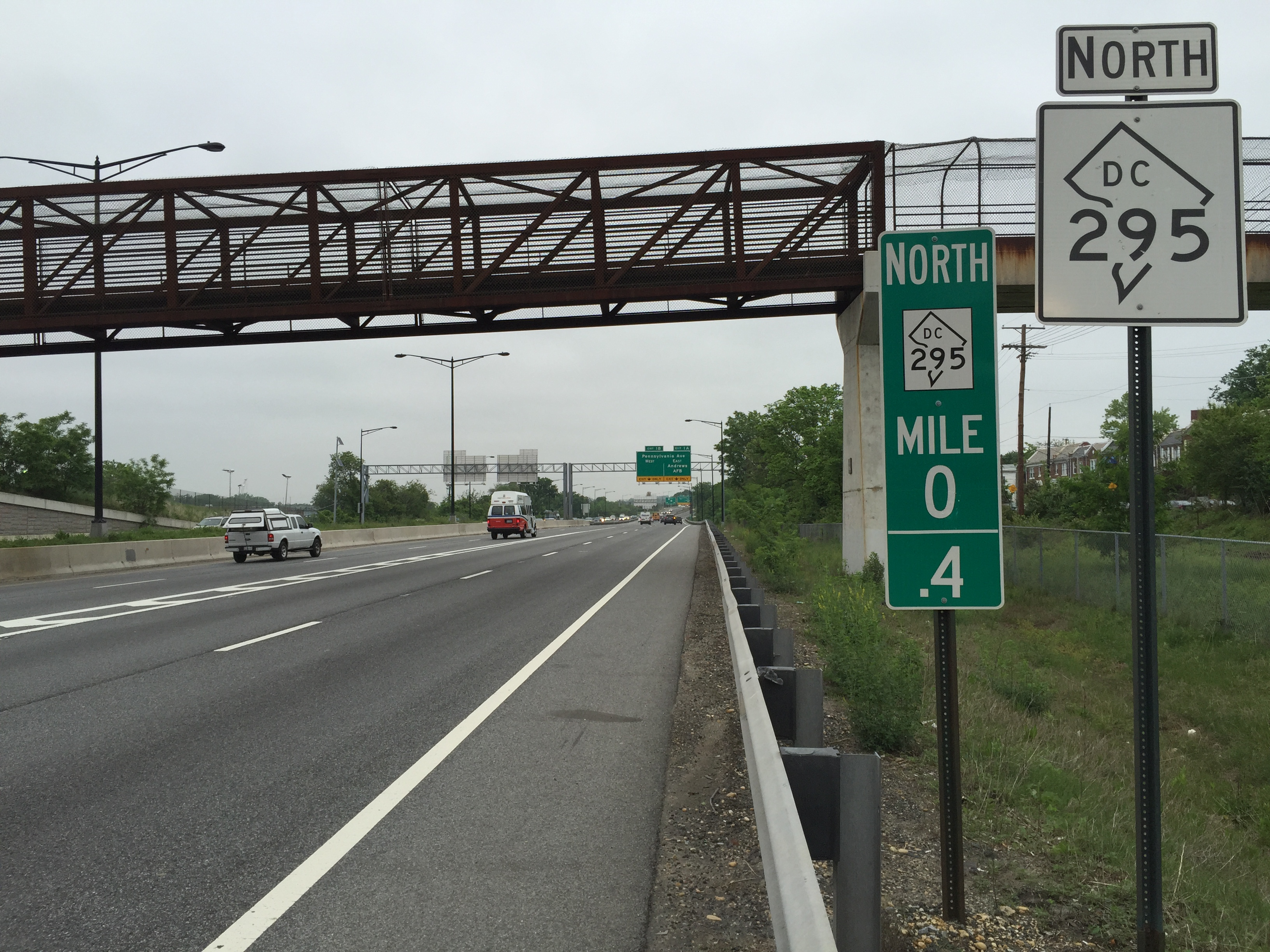
View north along DC 295 approaching Pennsylvania Avenue

DC 295 starts at a split from I-295 and I-695 at the 11th Street Bridges in Anacostia. From there, it continues northeasterly along the Anacostia River to the DC-Maryland border. Mileposts continue the sequence of I-295 from the split. Frontage roads near the north end are known as Kenilworth Avenue, which is the name of MD 201 after splitting from the main freeway. DC 295 is part of the National Highway System.

== History ==
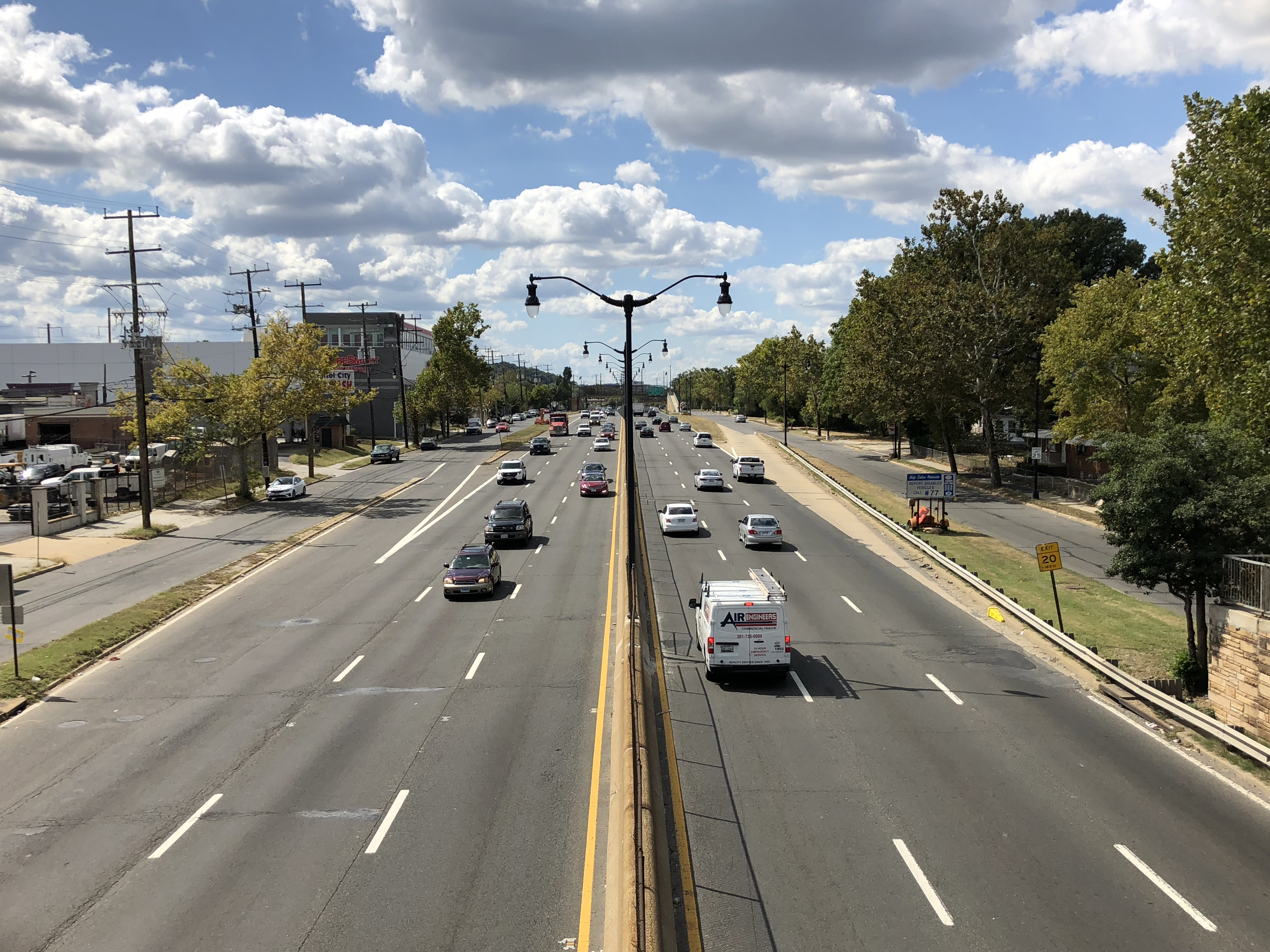
DC 295 southbound along the Kenilworth Avenue Freeway

What is now DC 295 was originally part of two separate highways: the Anacostia Freeway and the Kenilworth Expressway. It was first conceived by the National Capital Park and Planning Commission in 1950 as a connector route between the Baltimore–Washington Parkway at Kenilworth Avenue and the Capital Beltway near Oxon Hill. The route would provide access to the Anacostia waterfront, which included Bolling Air Force Base and the Anacostia Naval Station. In 1955, District officials approved the portion of the route between Suitland Parkway and East Capitol Street; the remainder of the route was approved in 1956. The southern portion of the route, from the Beltway to the 11th Street Bridges, was given a financial boost when it was included in the Interstate Highway System. The route was designated I-295 by AASHTO in 1958.

Work on the Kenilworth Expressway, the portion from East Capitol to the Baltimore-Washington Parkway, began in 1952 and ended in October 1957. Construction of the Expressway included four pedestrian bridges over it. It was all part of the same project that built the East Capitol Street Bridge at the time. The Kenilworth Interchange, between the Expressway, US-50 and the Parkway started work in 1956 and ended at the same time as the Expressway.

Initial construction of the Anacostia Freeway began in the summer of 1957 with the East Capitol Street overpass over Kenilworth Avenue and was completed in 1964. The final part of the project, the connecting ramps to the 11th Street Bridges, opened the following year.

The Expressway between Benning Road and the District Line was built on the right of way of the former Benning streetcar line, which is why parts of it are narrow with short entrances and exits. Until May 1, 1949, streetcar routes 10 and 12 operated from downtown to Deane Avenue. Route 10 continued to Kenilworth, just inside the District Line. Route 12 turned off and ran to Seat Pleasant. That right of way was later paved and it is now called Nannie Helen Burroughs Avenue.

=== Designation ===
As soon as the late 1960s, the entire freeway was known colloquially and in the media as "Route 295". However, this was fact only to the 11th Street Bridges, where the I-295 designation ends: the road continued north as the unnumbered Anacostia Freeway –– a name which appeared on maps but was not signed –– to East Capitol Street, then as Kenilworth Avenue to the Maryland border. The three different names and lack of a single number caused confusion for even local drivers.

In July 1989, Washington Post transportation columnist Ron Schaffer ("Dr. Gridlock") wrote about the issue. He inquired with the District's chief traffic engineer, George Schoene, who disclosed that he wanted to number the northern remainder of the freeway D.C. 295 to ease confusion. However, the D.C. Department of Public Works, which oversaw transportation projects at the time, had no funding to add and replace signage. Schaffer started a donation campaign among Post readers, and the signs were installed in the spring of 1990.

== Exit list ==
Exit numbers were added in 2014 as part of the 11th Street Bridges reconstruction. The entire route is in Washington, D.C.

Location	mi	km	Exit	Destinations	Notes
Fairlawn	0.00	0.00	1A	I-295 south to I-95 / I-495 – Richmond, Alexandria	Continuation south
Fairlawn	0.1	0.16	1B	I-695 west to I-395 – Downtown	Southbound exit and northbound entrance; future I-395
Fairlawn	0.1	0.16	1C	MLK Jr. Avenue SE / 11th Street SE	Southbound exit and northbound entrance
Fairlawn	0.83	1.34	1D	Pennsylvania Avenue – Andrews AFB	Signed as exits 1A (east) and 1B (west) northbound; no southbound access to Penn Avenue west
Greenway	2.23	3.59	—	East Capitol Street west	No northbound exit
River Terrace– Benning line	2.59	4.17	—	River Terrace	Southbound exit only
River Terrace– Benning line	2.79	4.49	—	Benning Road west / Foote Street – RFK Stadium	Left exit and entrance northbound; no northbound access to Foote Street
Eastland Gardens– Deanwood line	3.30	5.31	—	Burroughs Avenue / Minnesota Avenue	
Kenilworth– Deanwood line	3.90	6.28	—	Polk Street	Northbound exit only
Kenilworth– Deanwood line	4.29	6.90	—	Quarles Street / Eastern Avenue	Northbound exit and southbound entrance
Kenilworth– Deanwood line	4.29	6.90	—	MD 201 north to I-95 (I-495) / US 50 / Baltimore-Washington Parkway (MD 295 north)	Continuation into Maryland
1.000 mi = 1.609 km; 1.000 km = 0.621 mi: Incomplete access

== See also ==
- List of numbered highways in Washington, D.C.
