= Anacostia Park =

Park in Washington, D.C., U.S.

- IUCN category V (protected landscape/seascape)
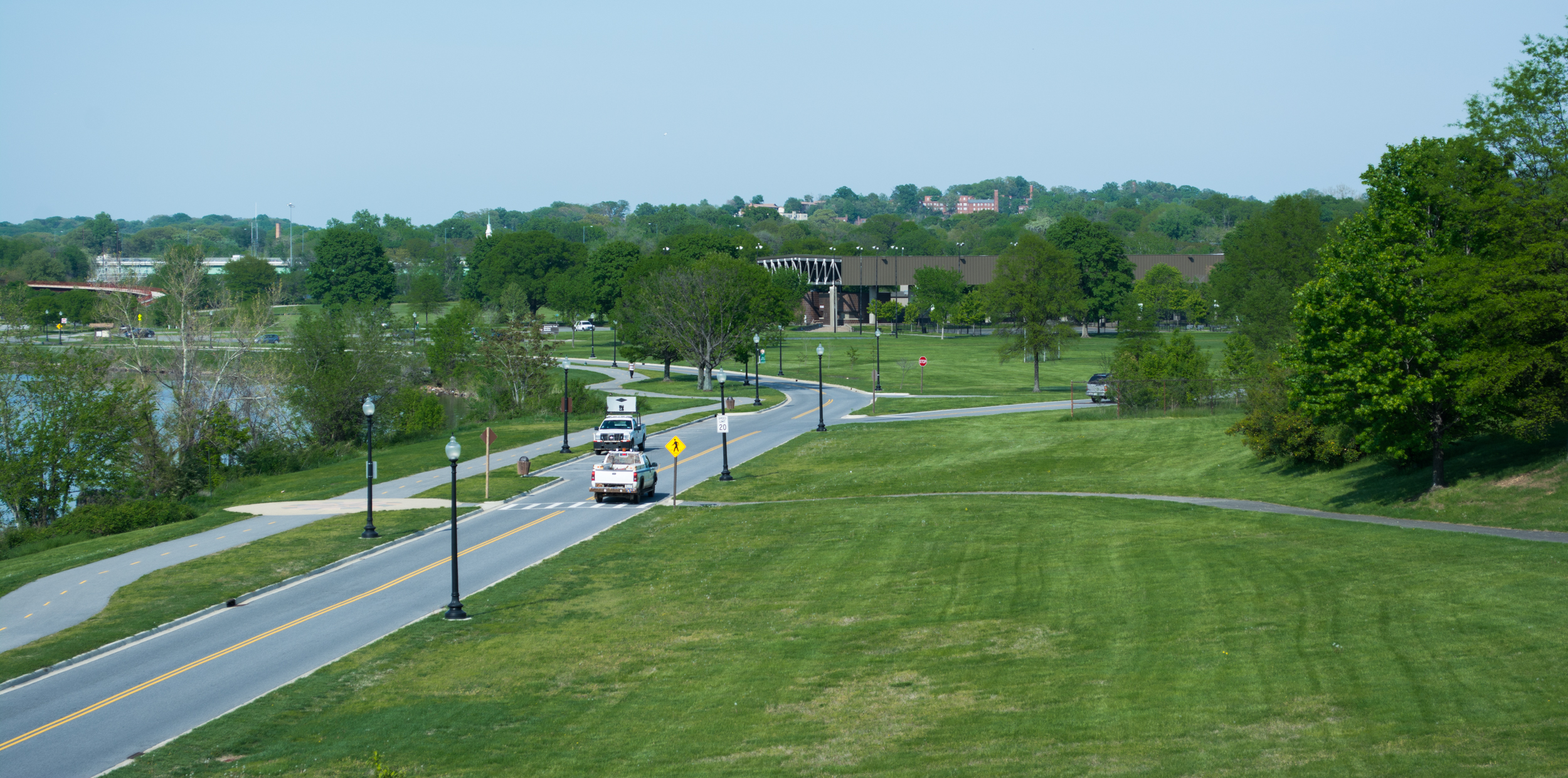
- Looking North towards the skating rink in the park, May 2014

- Location within the United States
- Location: Washington, D.C., U.S.
- Coordinates: 38°52′41″N 76°58′09″W
- Area: 1,200 acres (4.9 km^{2})
- Governing body: National Park Service
- Website: www.nps.gov/anac/index.htm

Anacostia Park is operated by the United States National Park Service. It is one of Washington, D.C.'s largest and most important recreation areas, with over 1200 acres (4.9 km^{2}) at multiple sites. Included in Anacostia Park are Kenilworth Park and Aquatic Gardens and Kenilworth Marsh. Hundreds of acres are available for ballfields, picnicking, basketball, tennis, and the Anacostia Park Pavilion has some 3,300 square feet (307 m^{2}) of space for roller skating and special events, the only roller skating rink in a U.S. national park. The Langston Golf Course offers an 18-hole course as well as a driving range, and three concession-operated marinas, four boat clubs, and a public boat ramp provide for access to the tidal Anacostia River for recreational boating.

"Eagles' Nest", the headquarters of the United States Park Police helicopter aviation unit, is located in Anacostia Park. Additionally, the headquarters of National Capital Parks-East is located within the park.
