= 11th Street Bridges =

Complex of three bridges across the Anacostia River in Washington, D.C.

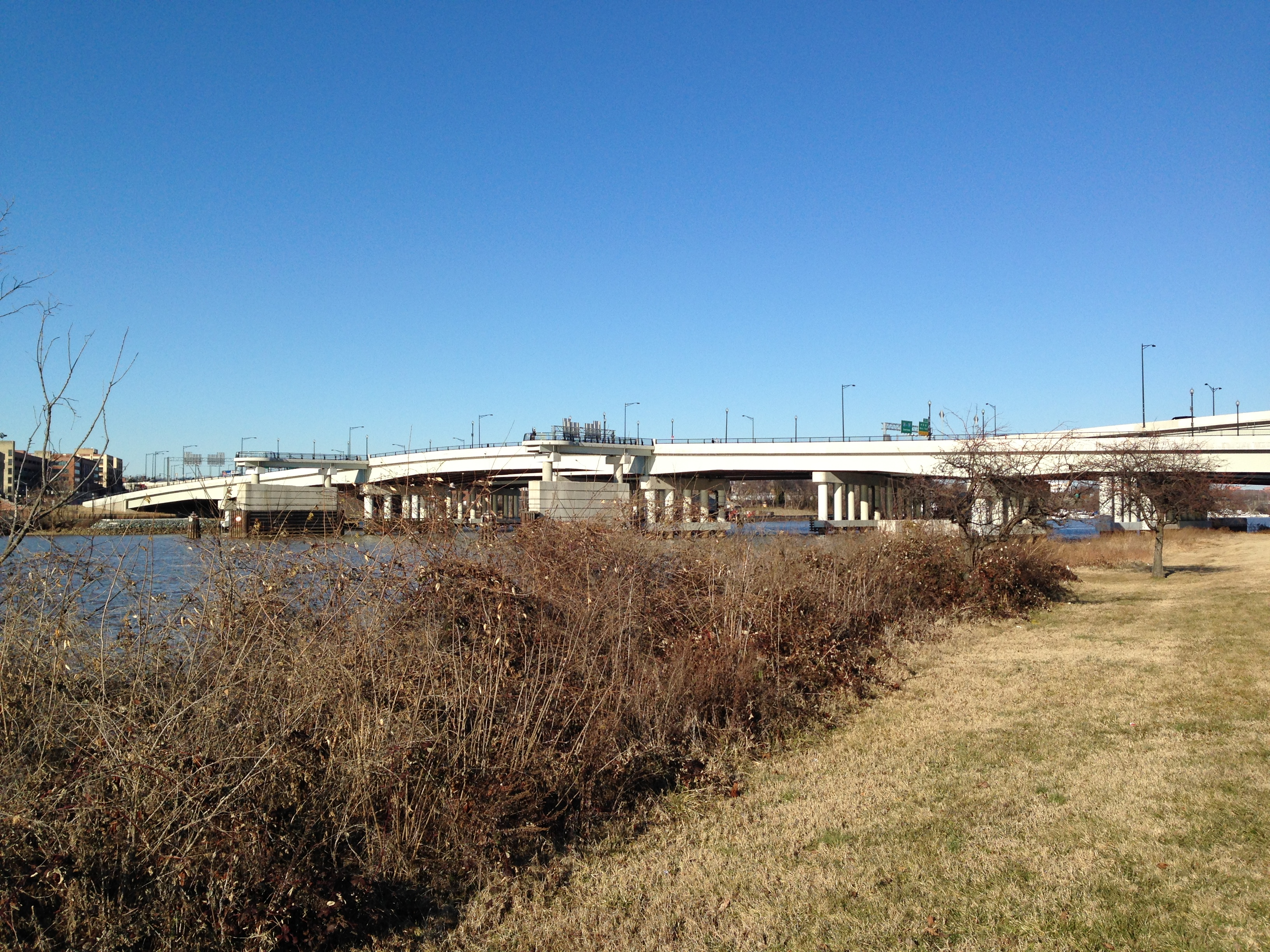
- The 11th Street Bridges from the south in 2015
- Coordinates: 38.8719°N 76.9895°W
- Carries: 8 lanes of I-695, 4 lanes of local traffic
- Crosses: Anacostia River
- Locale: Washington, D.C., U.S.
- Official name: Officer Kevin J. Welsh Memorial Bridge (southbound span); 11th Street Bridge (northbound span)
- Maintained by: District of Columbia Department of Transportation

Characteristics
- Design: Beam bridge
- Total length: 931 feet (284 m)
- Width: 63 feet (19 m)
- Longest span: 234 feet (71 m)

History
- Opened: Original Northbound span: March 18, 1965; Original Southbound span: 1969; New Northbound span: December 2011; 14 years ago New Southbound span: January 2012; 14 years ago Local bridge: January 2013; 13 years ago
- Closed: Original Northbound span: 2012 (46–47 years old); Original Southbound span: 2012 (42–43 years old)

Statistics
- Daily traffic: 86,000 per day (2004)
- Toll: None

Location
- Interactive map of 11th Street Bridges

The 11th Street Bridges are a complex of three bridges across the Anacostia River in Washington, D.C., United States. The bridges convey Interstate 695 across the Anacostia to its southern terminus at Interstate 295 and DC 295. The bridges also connect the neighborhood of Anacostia with the rest of the city of Washington.

The first bridge at the site, constructed about 1800, played a role in the War of 1812. It burned in 1846, but was repaired. A second bridge was constructed in 1873, and replaced in 1907. A modern, four-lane bridge replaced the older bridge in 1965, and a second four-lane bridge added in 1969. In 2009, construction began on three spans (two carrying freeway traffic, one carrying local-only traffic) to replace the 1965 and 1969 bridges. The northbound bridge opened to traffic in December 2011 while the southbound bridge open to traffic in January 2012. The new bridges include new ramps and new interchanges with I-295 (the Anacostia Freeway). The local bridge opened to traffic in May 2012. Portions of all three bridges and their approaches remained under construction into 2013. Phase 1 of the project was completed ahead of schedule and within budget in July 2013. The local bridge was fully complete by September 2013. Phase 2 of the project, including the conversion of the Barney Circle Freeway into a boulevard, was completed in 2015.

== Early bridges ==
The first bridge across the Anacostia River in this area was the Eastern Branch Bridge, a privately owned toll and drawbridge built between 1795 and 1800 about 0.25 miles (0.40 km) upstream from 11th Street SE (at the site of the current John Philip Sousa Bridge). The Eastern Branch Bridge was blown up and partially burned by retreating American soldiers in August 1814 during the War of 1812. It was rebuilt, but burned completely in August 1846.

In 1820, the privately owned "Upper Navy Yard Bridge" was built over the Anacostia River at 11th Street SE. Also a toll bridge, this second bridge became a "free" bridge in 1848 after it was purchased by the federal government. From the city's founding until 1854, the area known today as Anacostia was primarily sparsely populated farmland. But Anacostia was platted in 1854, and development slowly began to turn the agricultural land into businesses and residences. The destruction of the Eastern Branch Bridge in 1846, however, significantly slowed growth in the area for five decades.

A second bridge was built in the same location as the Navy Yard Bridge in 1872–1873. This bridge was replaced in 1905-1907 by a stronger, wider span (the "Anacostia Bridge") which accommodated streetcars. It was this span which the Bonus Army fled across on July 28, 1932, when attacked by the United States Army.

== 1960s bridges ==
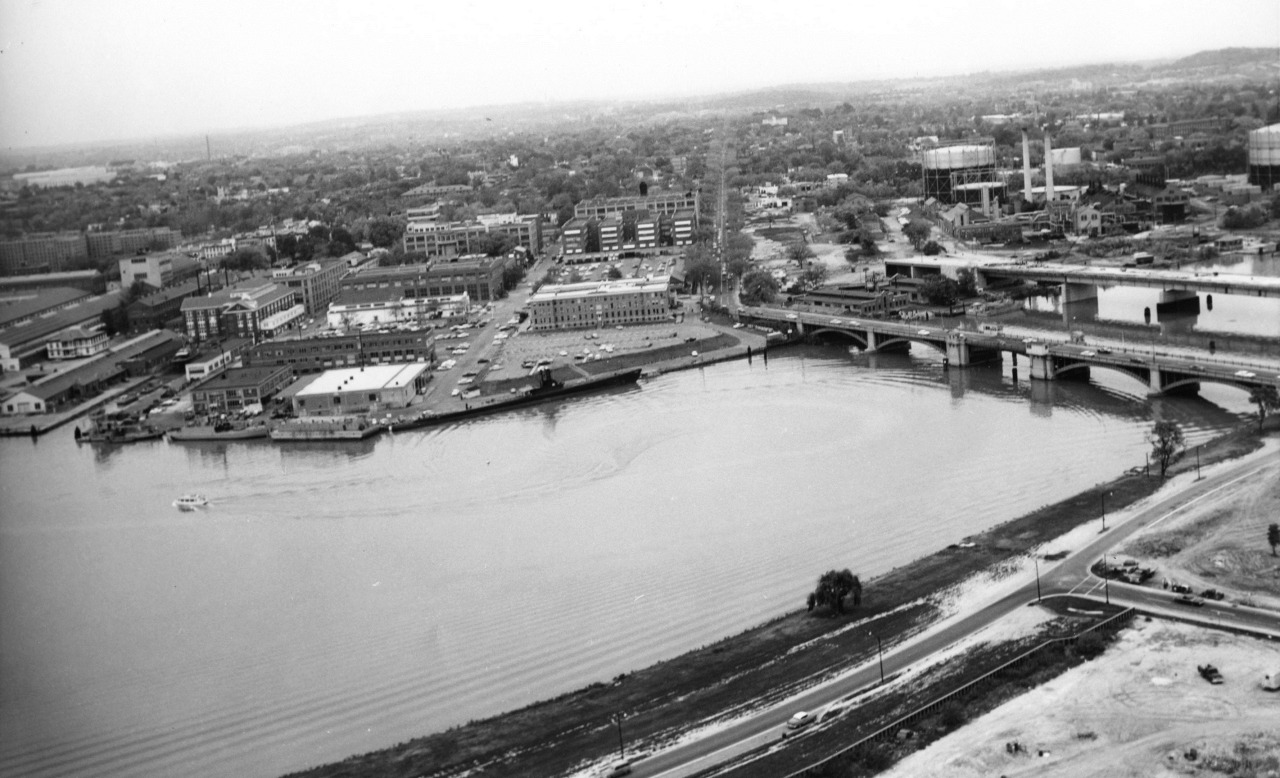
Photo of the 1907 built Anacostia Bridge with the under construction 11th Street Bridge next to it.

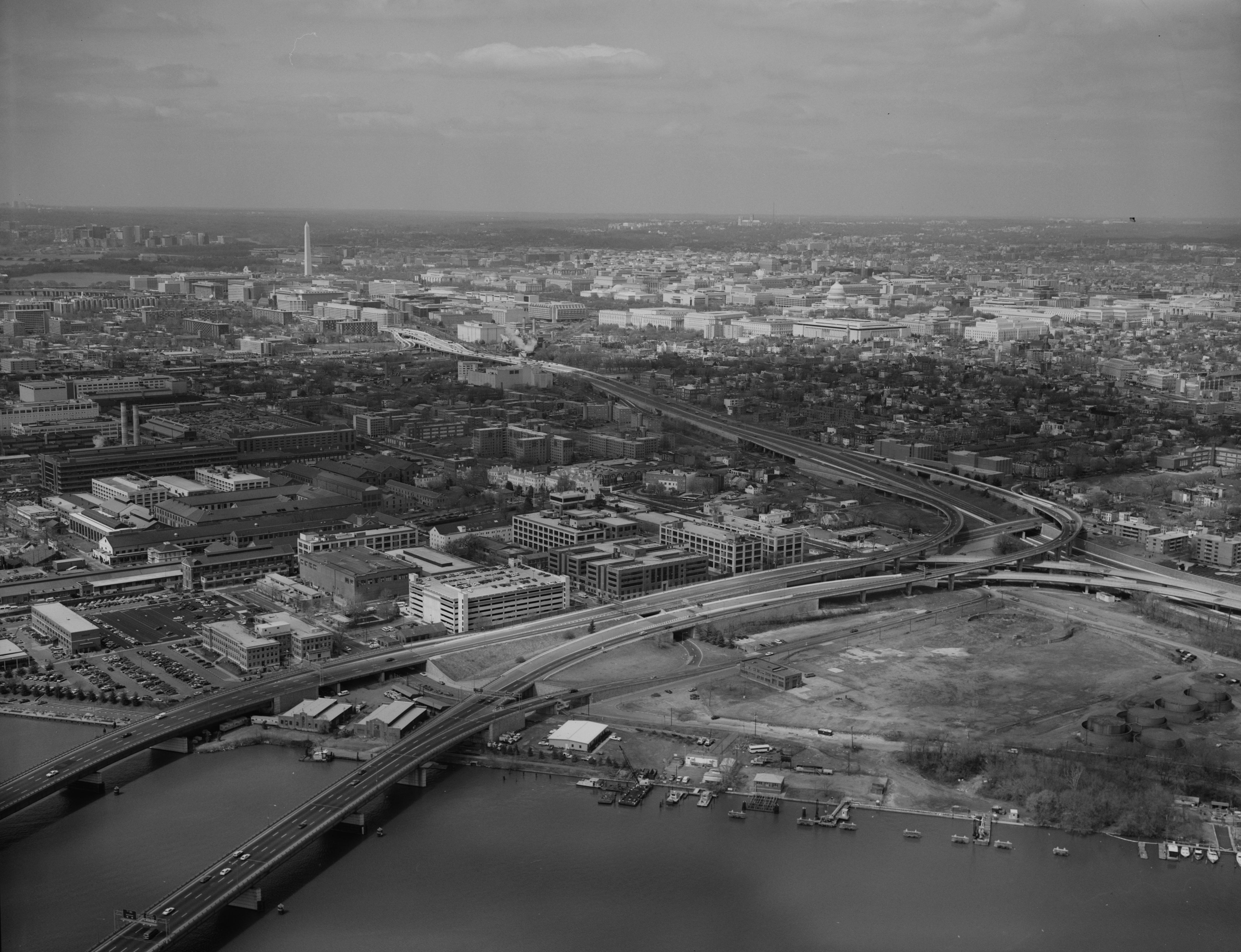
The north end of the original 11th Street Bridges in 1992.

Replacement of the 1907 span began in the 1960s. A modern, four-lane bridge carrying one-way northbound traffic opened next to the Anacostia Bridge on March 18, 1965 as part of the development of the "Inner Loop" (see below). A second four-lane bridge replaced the Anacostia Bridge in 1969, with one-way traffic over the span of each bridge.

The southbound structure was officially named the Officer Kevin J. Welsh Memorial Bridge, while the northbound structure was officially named the 11th Street Bridge. Both were beam bridges: "[The spans] are two-girder systems with steel composite construction and a central drop-in span on pin supports. The main girders are riveted and welded, and both have reinforced wall type piers with granite facing, supported by steel H piles." Each span was about 63 feet (19 m) wide. Each bridge had roughly five sections—four sections of about 170 feet (52 m) in length, with a center section about 234 feet (71 m) in length. Both spans were considered "fracture critical," which means that if one girder in the span fails the entire bridge is likely to collapse.

In 1956, federal and regional transportation planners proposed an Inner Loop Expressway, one of three circumferential beltways for the District of Columbia. The innermost beltway would have formed a flattened oval about a mile in radius centered on the White House. The middle beltway would have formed an arc along the northern portion of the city, running from the proposed Barney Circle Freeway terminus near Robert F. Kennedy Memorial Stadium to near 37th Street NW at the north end of Georgetown.

Two decades of protest led to the cancellation of all but the I-395 and I-695 portions of the plan. The unbuilt portions of the project were finally cancelled in 1977. Several ramps allowing traffic on the 11th Street Bridges to access I-295/Anacostia Freeway and I-695 eastbound remained unbuilt because of these cancellations, creating severe traffic problems on both ends of the bridges.

== 2009 rebuilding ==
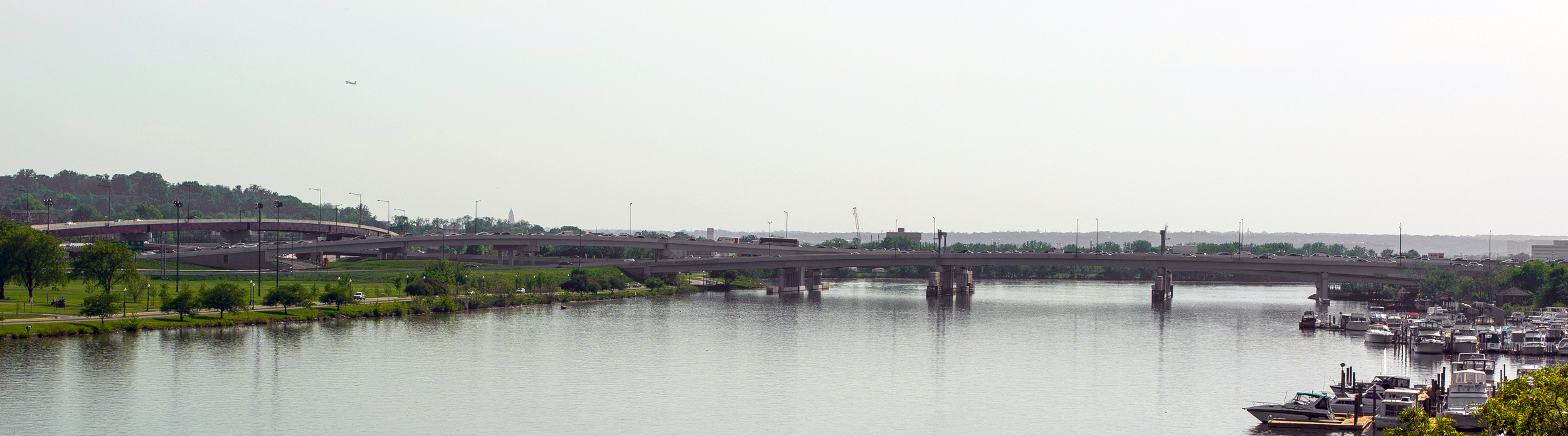
Panorama of the completed 11th Street Bridges. To the left are the flyovers and underpasses which make up the Suitland Parkway/D.C. Route 295 (Anacostia Freeway) interchange.

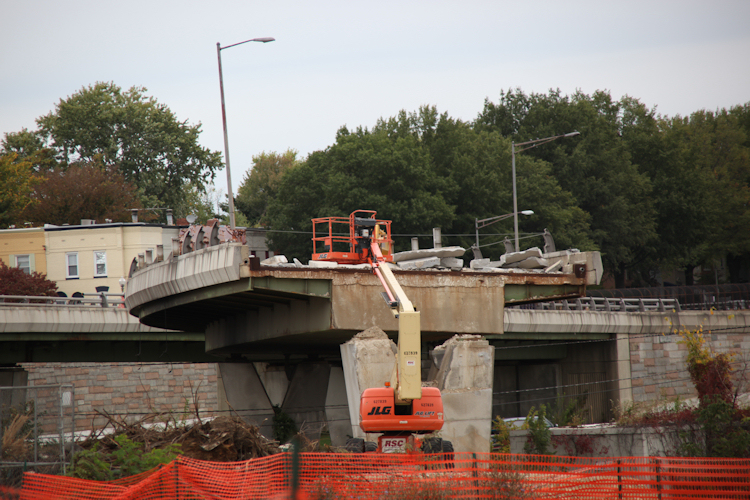
Demolition and removal of a portion of the connecting span between the north span of the 11th Street Bridge and Interstate 695 (Southeast Freeway) on October 10, 2009

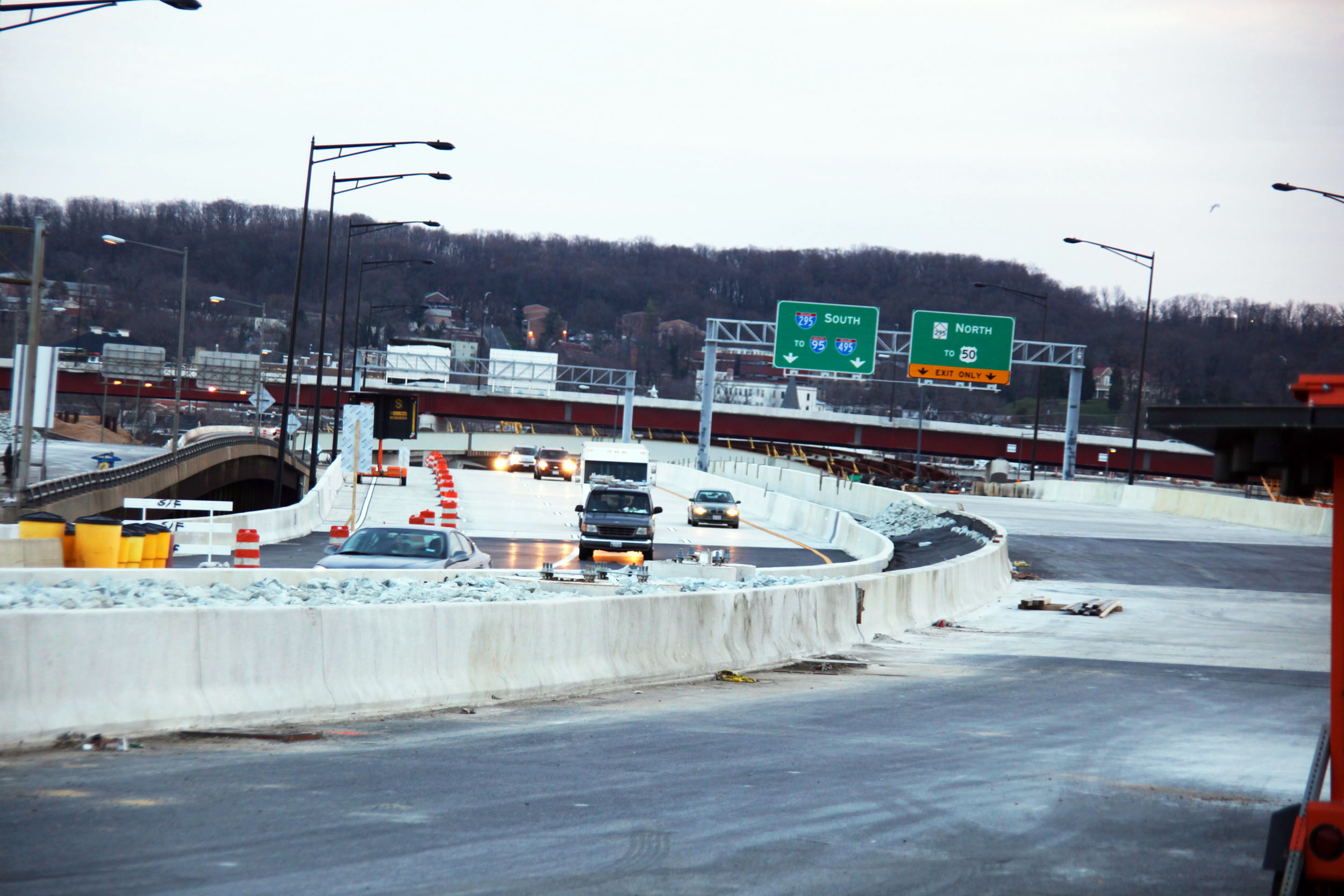
11th Street Bridges under construction in 2011

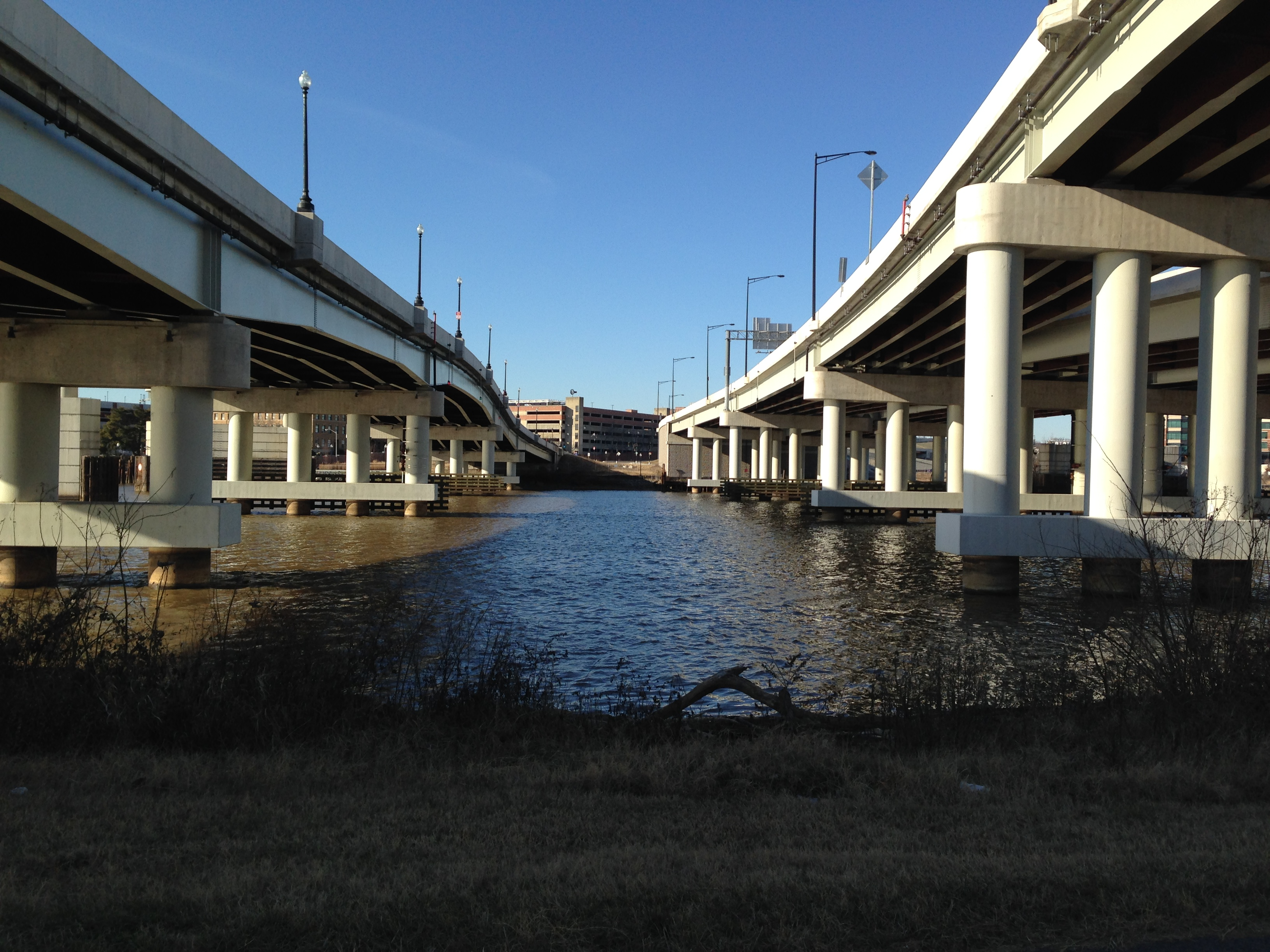
Underside of the completed bridges in 2015

The District of Columbia assessed the bridges in 2002. The Welsh Memorial Bridge was rated "satisfactory" (superstructure rating of 6; substructure rating of 6) while the 11th Street Bridge was rated "fair to poor" (superstructure rating of 5; substructure rating of 4). Both superstructures were near maximum life expectancy. In 2004, the two bridges carried 86,000 vehicles per day, the second-largest volume of the four "middle Anacostia River" bridge crossings. Without improvements to traffic patterns across the Anacostia River, the District of Columbia Department of Transportation (DDOT) estimated in 2005 that traffic over the 11th Street Bridges would significantly expand to 105,100 vehicles per day by 2030, an increase of 22.2 percent over 2004 and more than 40.3 percent higher than the next-busiest bridge (Sousa Bridge). DDOT undertook a major study of the bridges in 2004 which concluded that both bridges should be replaced.

DDOT and the FHWA issued notices to proceed with further assessments in September 2005, a draft environmental impact assessment was published in July 2006, a final environmental assessment was published in September 2007, and a decision to proceed promulgated in July 2008. Public hearings were held in September 2005, December 2005, and July 2006. Because of design changes, the environmental impact study was re-evaluated in July 2009 and found to still be sufficient. The goals of the project were:

- to reduce traffic congestion on both the 11th Street Bridges and on local streets;
- to increase the safety of all types of traffic on local streets;
- to replace the current bridges;
- to provide an improved emergency evacuation route for the nation's capital; and
- to provide routes for security personnel in and out of the nation's capital.

The project also included a pedestrian walkway to provide foot traffic access across the bridges as well.

The entire replacement project was expected to cost $365 million. Demolition of a portion of the bridges began in July 2009 (a portion of M Street SE and I-295 access ramp at 12th Street SE were closed for two weekends to permit demolition of bridge ramps), and construction was scheduled to end in 2013.

On-ramps from Anacostia to the northbound span of the 11th Street Bridges were closed on December 20, 2009, for five and a half hours after heavy snow blocked the approaches during the North American blizzard of 2009, with the snow removal disrupting automobile traffic and forcing the temporary closure of several Metrobus routes which use the bridge.

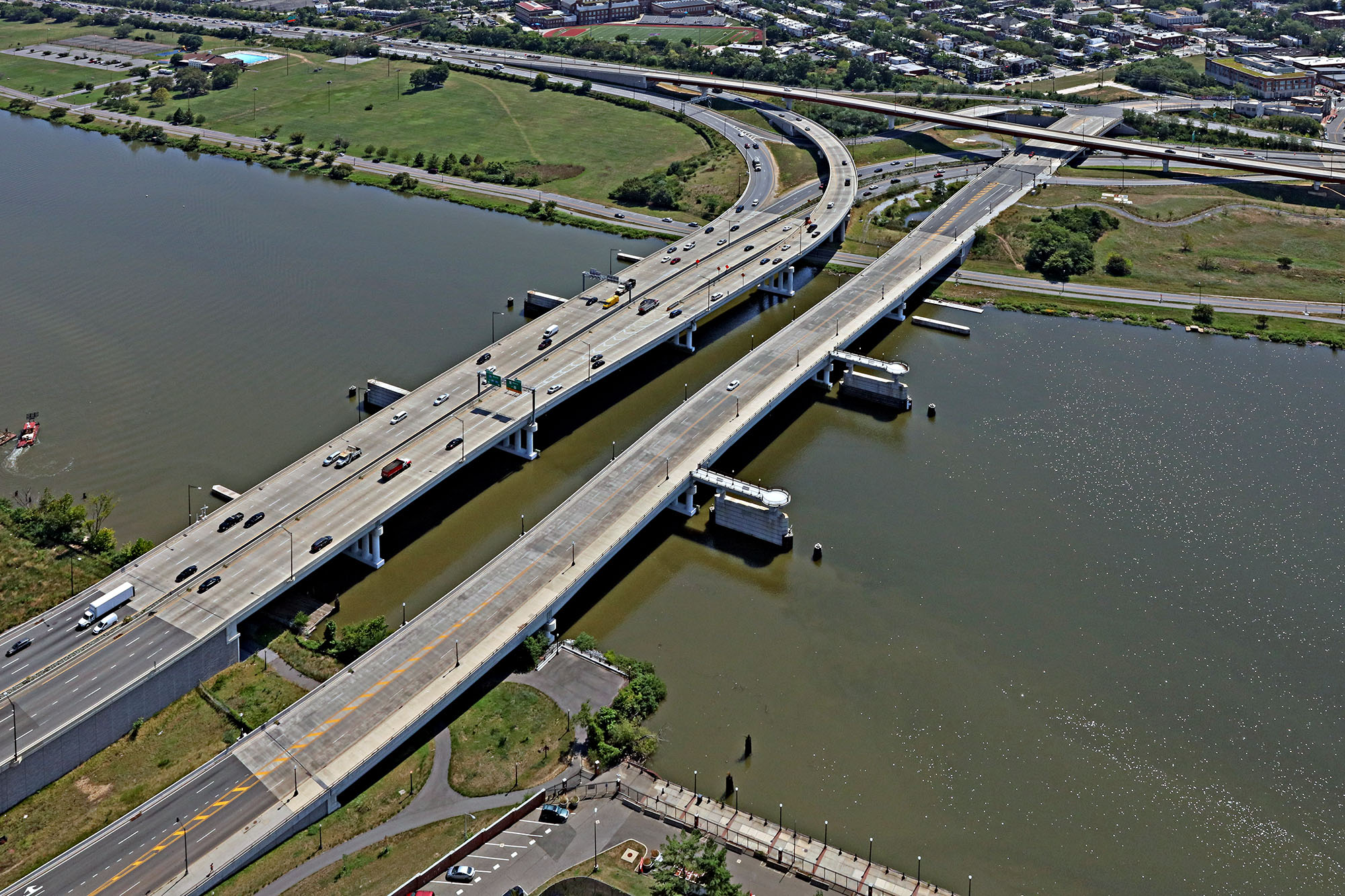
11 Street Bridges and I-695 Looking West

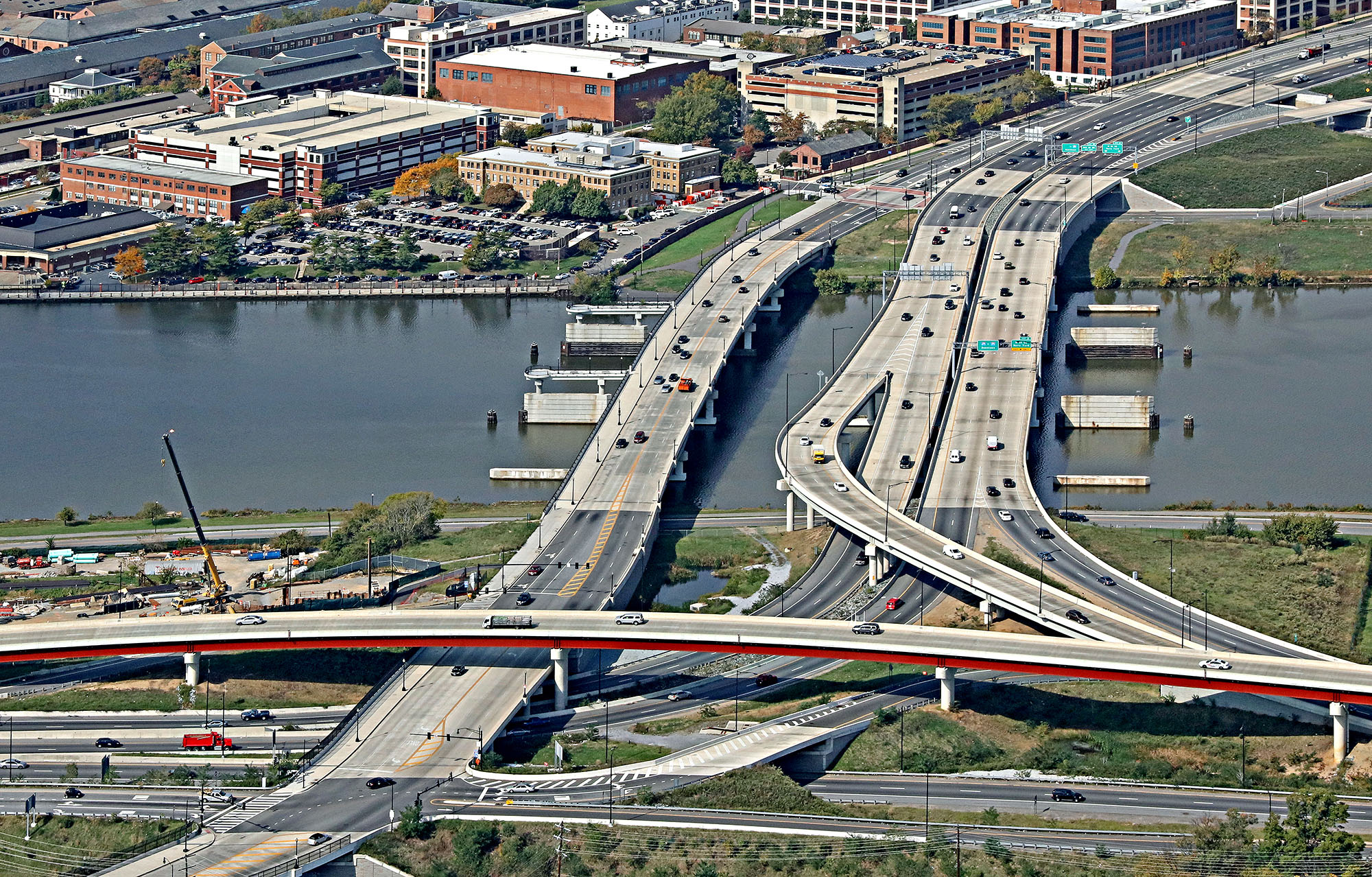
11 Street Bridges and Martin Luther King Jr Ave Looking West

Lane closures on the bridges, as well lane closures and other traffic restrictions on nearby local roads and on- and off-ramps, began October 26, 2010, as the construction moved from the middle of the Anacostia River toward the shore. City engineers estimated that the project was 25 percent complete by late October 2010. The project was on track for completion in 2013. On November 5, 2010, construction crews began driving piles east of the bridge on its northern side to begin construction of the ramp connecting the new bridge to east-bound Southeast Freeway.

DDOT officials said in January 2011 that they expected a new connection with southbound I-295 to open during the spring, for construction on the two freeway spans to be complete by fall, and for the local span to open in 2013. Lane closures on the 11th Street Bridges, small segments of Southeast-Southwest Freeway, I-295, and local streets began on March 23, 2011, and continued through June.

The bridges' construction sparked some controversy. On March 22, a citizens group named "D.C. Jobs or Else" organized a protest of about 50 individuals on the 11th Street Bridges. Joined by D.C. Council member Marion Barry, the protesters said too few individuals from the Anacostia area (which suffers from a 30 percent unemployment rate) had been considered for employment or hired by Skanska/Facchina, the joint-venture construction company building the bridges. Skanska/Facchina vice president Brook Brookshire denied the accusations, noting that 51 percent of the new hires were D.C. residents, the company had engaged in extensive outreach to the unemployed, and that the company had worked with local jobs organizations, the D.C. Department of Employment Services, and the D.C. Department of Transportation to find workers for the project. Brookshire also said the company had provided training to unskilled workers to enable them to work on the project and find careers in the construction industry.

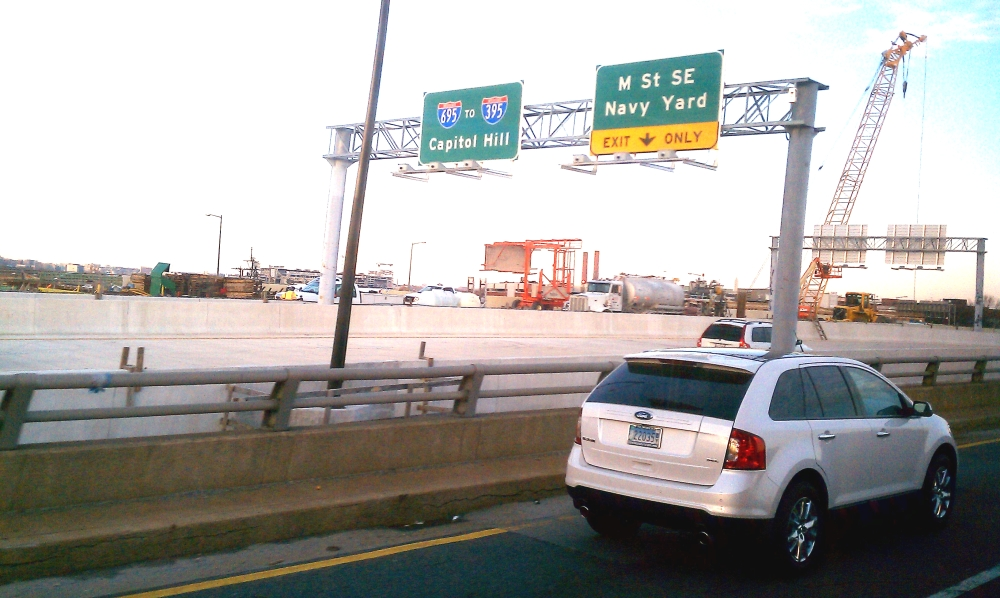
Signage on the new inbound span of the 11th Street Bridges shows the connection with I-695, which will be marked for the first time in its history.

In May 2011, DDOT closed the off-ramp from the bridges to Martin Luther King Jr. Avenue SE. The agency said the closure would create a larger work area and speed up construction of the new bridges and approaches. Traffic was rerouted along the existing Good Hope Road on-ramp through the end of 2011, although this meant the ramp now carried two-way traffic in a single lane each way. Significant afternoon rush-hour delays occurred in the area due to the rerouting.

In August 2011, the D.C. City Council designated the 11th Street Bridges, a portion of Southeast/Southwest Freeway, Maine Avenue SW, and Independence Avenue SW "Martin Luther King, Jr. Avenue" in honor of the slain civil rights leader. The dedication came in time for the planned dedication of the Martin Luther King, Jr. Memorial. The renaming was honorary, and did not formally change the names of these bridges, highways, and streets.

The non-local spans were finished months ahead of schedule, and D.C. Mayor Vincent C. Gray held a ribbon-cutting ceremony on December 16, 2011, to open the two bridges connecting I-295 with the Anacostia Freeway. The two spans were projected to carry 180,000 automobiles per day by 2032. The inbound I-295 span opened on Monday, December 19, 2011. The span carried both I-295 traffic as well as traffic coming up from neighborhood streets in Anacostia until the separate Anacostia-only span opened in 2013. Officials in December 2011 predicted the local-only span, which was intended to carry not only automobiles but also include bicycle and pedestrian lanes, would open in the summer of 2012.

Before the opening of the spans, DDOT received permission from the U.S. Department of Transportation to extend the designation of I-695 to the interchange with I-295.

The opening of the new spans eliminated a dangerous portion of I-295 where motorists moving right to access the 11th Street Bridges mixed with motorists moving left as they entered the freeway from Firth Sterling Avenue SE. However, to allow local traffic access to the rest of the city, a set of temporary on- and off-ramps were made to give Anacostia residents access to the bridges. In March 2012, DDOT also closed the ramp leading from I-695 to the 11th Street Bridges so that new approaches and connections to the new spans could be constructed. Ten Metrobus routes were rerouted due to the span closure, adding significant travel times for Anacostia commuters. Motorists attempting to reach Anacostia were forced to use one of three time-consuming alternative routes: exit I-395 at the Sixth Street SE ramp, travel through local streets, and use an on-ramp next to the Washington Navy Yard to access the undemolished old outbound bridge; continue onto I-295 and exit at Howard Road SE; exit onto South Capitol Street and take the Frederick Douglass Bridge; or continue east to the John Philip Sousa Bridge.

In January 2012, DDOT officials said that even when the third span opened in the summer of 2012, it would not be complete. DDOT said that one of the outbound traffic lanes would not be complete, nor would the pedestrian/bike lane. DDOT also admitted that Anacostia residents traveling into the city would not have direct access to M Street as originally planned. Instead, motorists would confront a dead-end and be forced to take a detour east onto O Street SE, travel north on 12th Street NE, and then make a left to reach M Street SE. DDOT said the final outbound lane to Anacostia as well as the bicycle/pedestrian lane would not be completed until the fall of 2012.

DDOT announced in April 2012 that it was on schedule to open the new ramp from the bridge to northbound Anacostia Freeway in June, and the new inbound-ramp on the north side of the bridge (connecting with I-395) in September.

=== Southeast Boulevard ===
Since the cancellation of the Inner Loop Expressway, motorists wanting to access the Baltimore–Washington Parkway or U.S. Route 50 in Maryland (the John Hanson Highway) would often travel Interstate 695 to Barney Circle, wait at the traffic light there, use Pennsylvania Avenue to cross the nearby Sousa Bridge, wait at a traffic light on the southwestern terminus of the bridge, and make a left turn against oncoming traffic to access a narrow and dangerous ramp that led to northbound D.C. Route 295 (the Anacostia Freeway). The combination of traffic lights, left turn, and mixing of both through-traffic and local traffic created extensive traffic congestion on the Sousa Bridge during evening rush hour.

After the DDOT began the replacement of the 11th Street Bridges in 2009, it closed the westbound segment of Interstate 695 from the 11th Street Bridges to Barney Circle in late November 2012, and the eastbound lanes in early 2013. This portion of was Interstate 695 was subsequently decommissioned, turning roughly five blocks of six-lane highway into city streets from the National Highway System. The unfinished "mixing bowl" exchange on the southern terminus of the 11th Street Bridges was also altered. Local traffic was separated from through-traffic by the construction of a bridge dedicated for local traffic only, and ramps connecting the bridge to D.C. Route 295 were created. Construction of the new ramps began in May 2012, with the ramp from southbound D.C. Route 295 onto the 11th Street Bridge completed in July 2012. The ramp from the bridges to northbound D.C. Route 295 opened on December 19, 2012.

The decommissioned portion of Interstate 695 began to be transformed into a boulevard named "Southeast Boulevard". The reconstruction project, estimated to take 18 to 24 months, raised the roadway 20 feet (6.1 m) to bring it level with the grade of the surrounding streets. The six-lane former highway began to be turned into a four-lane grand boulevard with a landscaped median and pedestrian nature trail. Southeast Boulevard was designed to link Barney Circle to 11th Street SE.

In 2013, DDOT published plans to reconfigure Barney Circle. Priorities for the project included improving and restoring access to neighborhood streets, and adding pedestrian and bicycle connectivity to local streets and the Anacostia River waterfront. DDOT also began exploring whether to connect Southeast Boulevard to 12th, 13th, 14th, and 15th Streets SE. By 2014, DDOT's plan involved possible reconstructing of Barney Circle into an intermodal transportation hub as well. DDOT planners said that construction on this project might begin as early as 2016.

=== Streetcar lane ===
The local span of the new 11th Street Bridges was designed to accommodate a lane for the trolley cars of the city's emerging DC Streetcar tram system. The Anacostia Line of the streetcar system was originally intended to travel north from the Anacostia Metro station to a streetcar station at the southern foot of the local span before connecting with the Navy Yard – Ballpark and Waterfront Metro stations. Design changes were made in the 11th Street Bridges to permit the streetcar tracks. In 2009, however, DDOT said the trolley cars would not travel down M Street SE/SW but rather proceed up 8th Street SE/NE to link with DC Streetcar's H Street Line. To help fund construction of the Anacostia Line, DDOT proposed transferring $10 million from demolition of the 11th Street Bridges, but put that plan on hold due to delays in the streetcar project.

For reasons which remain unclear, DDOT shuttered construction of the Anacostia line in August 2010. Funding for the Anacostia Line over the 11th Street Bridges subsequently fell through as well. DDOT had applied for an $18 million Transportation Investment Generating Economic Recovery (TIGER) grant from the United States Department of Transportation to build the trolley bed and lay tracks along the local span, but the federal agency denied the application in October 2010. Three days later, DDOT released a new DC Streetcar map showing the Anacostia Line terminating at the Anacostia Metro station.

However, in October 2009, construction began on the new United States Department of Homeland Security (DHS) headquarters on what used to be the west campus of St. Elizabeths Hospital. As the first DHS headquarters building neared completion, the need for a streetcar line to move DHS workers from the Anacostia and Congressional Heights Metro lines into the heart of Anacostia became urgent. Federal and city officials also wanted to find a way to link the 8th Street Marine Corps Barracks and United States Navy facilities at the Washington Navy Yard to the DHS campus. DDOT and the Federal Transit Administration began holding a series of public meetings to determine how to link the 11th Street Bridges with DHS.

By June 2011, three public meetings had been held, in which 10 alternate routes for the streetcar line had been identified. In January 2012 the fourth public meeting narrowed the routes down to four alternatives for linking the Anacostia Metro station to the bridges.

=== Proposed 11th Street Bridges recreation project ===
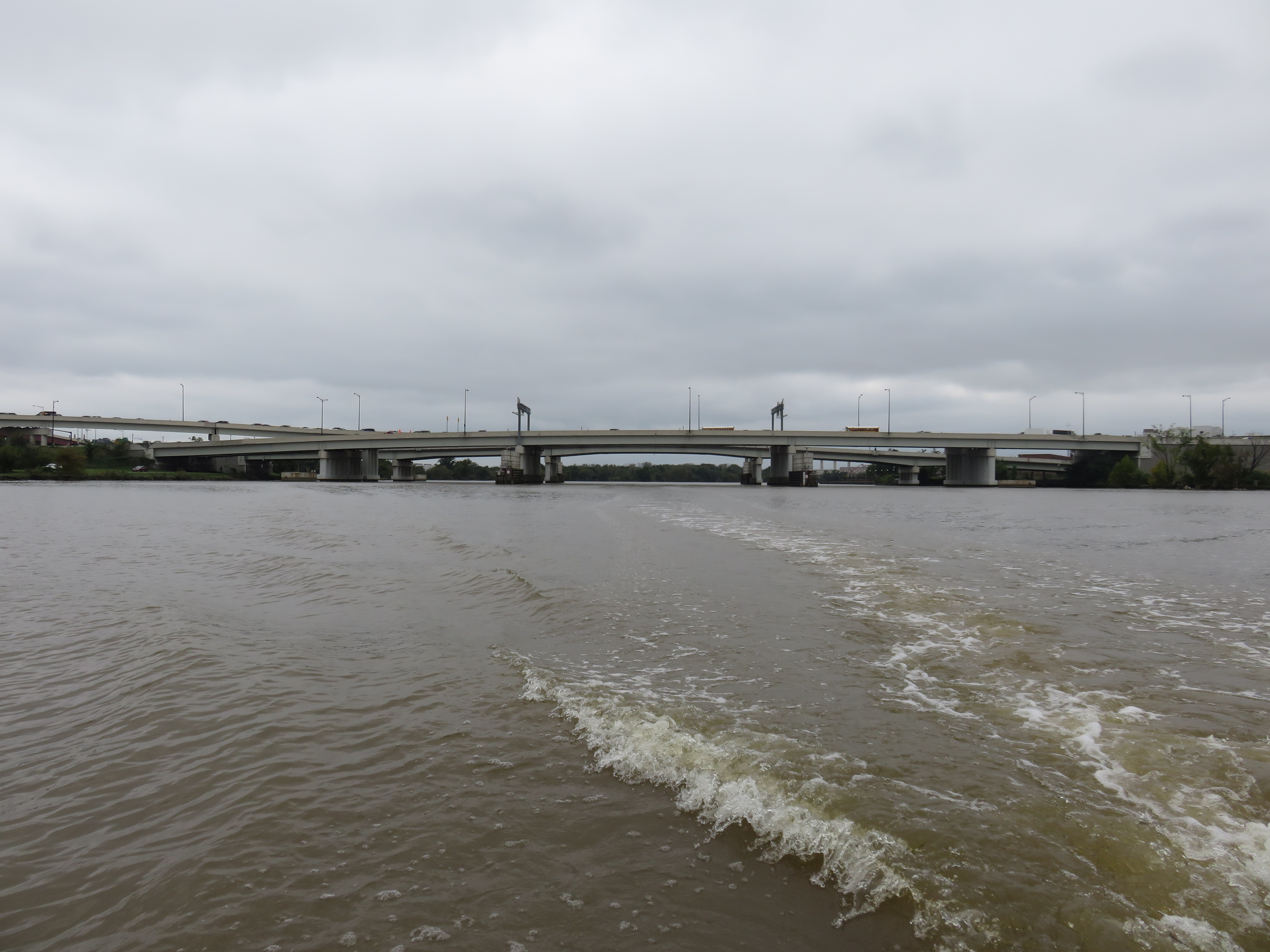
11th Street Bridges from the water in 2018

DDOT originally planned to tear down the spans of the existing 11th Street Bridges, but leave the piers standing. The agency planned to connect the bicycle/pedestrian lane on the new local-only span with two of the piers left over from the demolition of the downstream span. Pedestrian observation platforms would be built on the piers. At both ends of the local-only span, the city also proposed building fishing piers, which would extend into the Anacostia River. The overlooks and fishing piers were expected to be completed in the fall of 2012 or the spring of 2013.

However, in March 2012 the Office of Planning within the D.C. Mayor's office proposed retaining the downstream span and turning it into a recreational destination. The inspiration for the concept came from New York City's High Line, a linear park and aerial greenway built on a section of the former elevated New York Central Railroad spur. The Office of Planning's initial concept proposed building a new 925-foot (282 m) superstructure on the piers, complete with utilities (electricity, natural gas, sewage, fresh water). A self-sustaining public-private partnership would develop parks, restaurants, and outdoor entertainment features on the span. City planners argued the concept would connect parks and trails along both sides of the Anacostia River, provide a "destination attraction" in the city's impoverished Southeast which could enhance retail sales as well as economic development in the area, and provide badly needed outdoor recreational facilities to residents of the Anacostia neighborhood. The cost of building a new span was estimated at between $25 and $35 million.

The city made its planning proposal about 45 to 60 days before demolition was to have begun on the existing span. It said it would hold a national design competition in the summer of 2012.

Reaction to the plan was mixed. Attendees at the city's meeting were reported to be highly enthusiastic. But Beth Purcell, president of the Capitol Hill Restoration Society, called the plan "bizarre" and argued that the city should not delay construction of the overlooks and fishing piers in favor of an unstudied design proposal with no funding. David Alpert, of the prominent local blog Greater Greater Washington, was more muted in his criticism. Writing for The Washington Post, he pointed out that the "recreation bridge" connected two neighborhoods of only moderate population density, and was not easily accessed from either side of the river. He argued that the space would have to have enough activity and importance to make it a "destination" space day and night. He cautioned that the space could easily turn into a dead zone or encourage crime and that the space would have to be connected to the 11th Street Bridges local-only span's bicycle/pedestrian lanes. He also suggested that one or more DC Streetcar stops be created along the bridge.
