= List of U.S. Highways in Washington, D.C. =

United States Numbered Highways in Washington, D.C.
- Highway marker for U.S. Highway 1

System information
- Formed: November 11, 1926

Highway names
- US Highways: US Highway X (US X)
- Special Routes: Alternate U.S. Highway X (ALT US X) Business U.S. Highway X (BUS US X) Bypass U.S. Highway X (BYP US X)

System links
- Streets and Highways of Washington, DC; Interstate; US; DC; State-Named Streets

In Washington, D.C., United States Numbered Highways comprise 10 current and former highways.

== U.S. Highways ==
Number	Length (mi)	Length (km)	Southern or western terminus	Northern or eastern terminus	Formed	Removed	Notes
US 1	7.0	11.3	14th Street Bridges in Arlington, VA	Eastern Avenue in Mt. Rainier, MD	1926	current	14th Street Bridges, 14th St SW/NW, Constitution Ave NW, 6th St NW (northbound) / 9th St NW (southbound), Rhode Island Ave NW/NE
US 1 Alt.	6.8	10.9	Pennsylvania Ave / 6th St NW (US 1) in Judiciary Square	Eastern Ave in Brentwood, MD	1926	current	Pennsylvania Ave NW, Constitution Ave NW/NE, Maryland Ave NE, Bladensburg Rd NE
US 1 Byp.	—	—	—	—	—	—	Current US 1 Alt. was known as US 1 Byp. in the 1940s; was cosigned with U.S. Route 50 Alt.
US 29	8.6	13.8	Francis Scott Key Bridge (Washington) in Arlington, VA	Eastern Ave in Silver Spring, MD	1926	current	Francis Scott Key Bridge, Whitehurst Freeway, K St NW, 11th St NW, Rhode Island Ave NW, 7th St NW, Georgia Ave NW
US 50	7.7	12.4	Theodore Roosevelt Bridge in Arlington, VA	John Hanson Highway near Cheverly, MD	1926	current	Theodore Roosevelt Bridge, Constitution Ave NW, 6th St NW (northbound) / 9th and L Sts NW (southbound), New York Ave NW/NE
US 50 Alt.	—	—	—	—	—	—	
US 50 Byp.	—	—	—	—	—	—	
US 211	—	—	—	—	1926	1980	US 211's eastern terminus was truncated to Warrenton, Virginia, eliminating the overlap with US-29.
US 240	—	—	—	—	1926	1972	US 240 began at the intersection of Pennsylvania Avenue and 14th Street near the White House. US 240 followed Massachusetts Ave to Wisconsin Ave.
US 240 Alt.	—	—	—	—	—	—	US 240 Alt. ran along Connecticut Avenue with its southern end at the intersection with US 240 at Dupont Circle.
Former
