= Heritage Island =

Heritage Island can mean:

- Heritage Island (District of Columbia), an island in Kingman Lake in Washington, D.C.
- Heritage USA, a defunct Christian theme park in Fort Mill, South Carolina, which contained a water park named Heritage Island
