= Angel Rich =

American entrepreneur

Angel Rich (born December 2, 1986) is an African American tech entrepreneur, author, and convicted felon.

== Early life and education ==
Rich is a native of Washington D.C, and grew up in the Kingman Park community of Capitol Hill. She received a bachelor's degree in marketing from Hampton University, and later studied Chinese business culture and language at the University of International Business and Economics in Beijing.

== Career ==
Rich started working as a global market research analyst for Prudential in 2009. Rich completed more than seventy studies on financial behavior and sold Prudential her first marketing campaign.

Rich started The Wealth Factory Inc., a company focused on financial literacy through education technology games, during her senior year at Hampton University. In 2016, Rich launched a mobile game app named Credit Stacker. Credit Stacker was named one of the top ten apps in the world by Google. It also received recognition from the United States Department of Education, the National Alliance of Public Charter Schools and the Office of Michelle Obama The White House for "best financial literacy product in the country."

In 2021, Rich partnered with Experian and launched the app CreditRich. CreditRich is a business that helps consumers raise their credit ratings by offering financial literacy and consultation services. Rich writes, speaks, and coaches people in money matters. Rich was the first Black American woman to establish an institutional partnership with one of the three major credit bureaus. As of 2022, the estimated net worth Rich was $50 million. Rich is also the founder of Black Tech Matters and Fintech.

The United Nations recognized her as one of the Top 100 Most Influential People in the African Diaspora in 2018. In 2023, Rich was a recipient of the Presidential Lifetime Achievement Award by the Biden Administration.

Rich is the author of History of the Black Dollar.

== Personal life ==
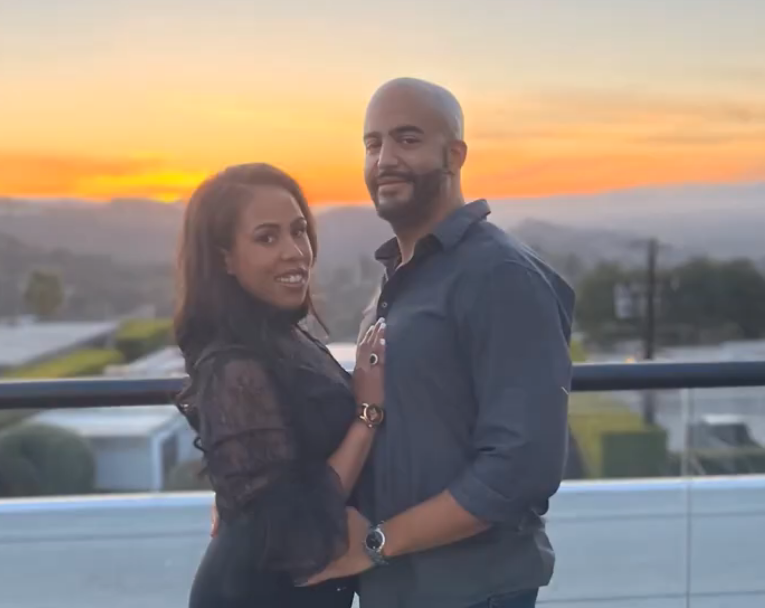
Angel Rich and Karl Jones

Angel Rich and Karl Jones got engaged on July 11, 2021 in front of the Lincoln Memorial in Washington, D.C. and were married on February 22, 2022 at the Saint Regis Hotel in Black Lives Matter Plaza. Karl is currently the Vice President of Sales and Strategy at CreditRich. The couple have no children and resides in Bowie, MD.

On January 20, 2026, Rich was sentenced to 10 years in prison for vehicular manslaughter for the death of a man in a 2023 accident. Evidence showed Rich was driving under the influence of alcohol and with excessive speed. She will serve a minimum of 3 years, with the remainder being a suspended sentence under probation.
