= Committee of 100 on the Federal City =

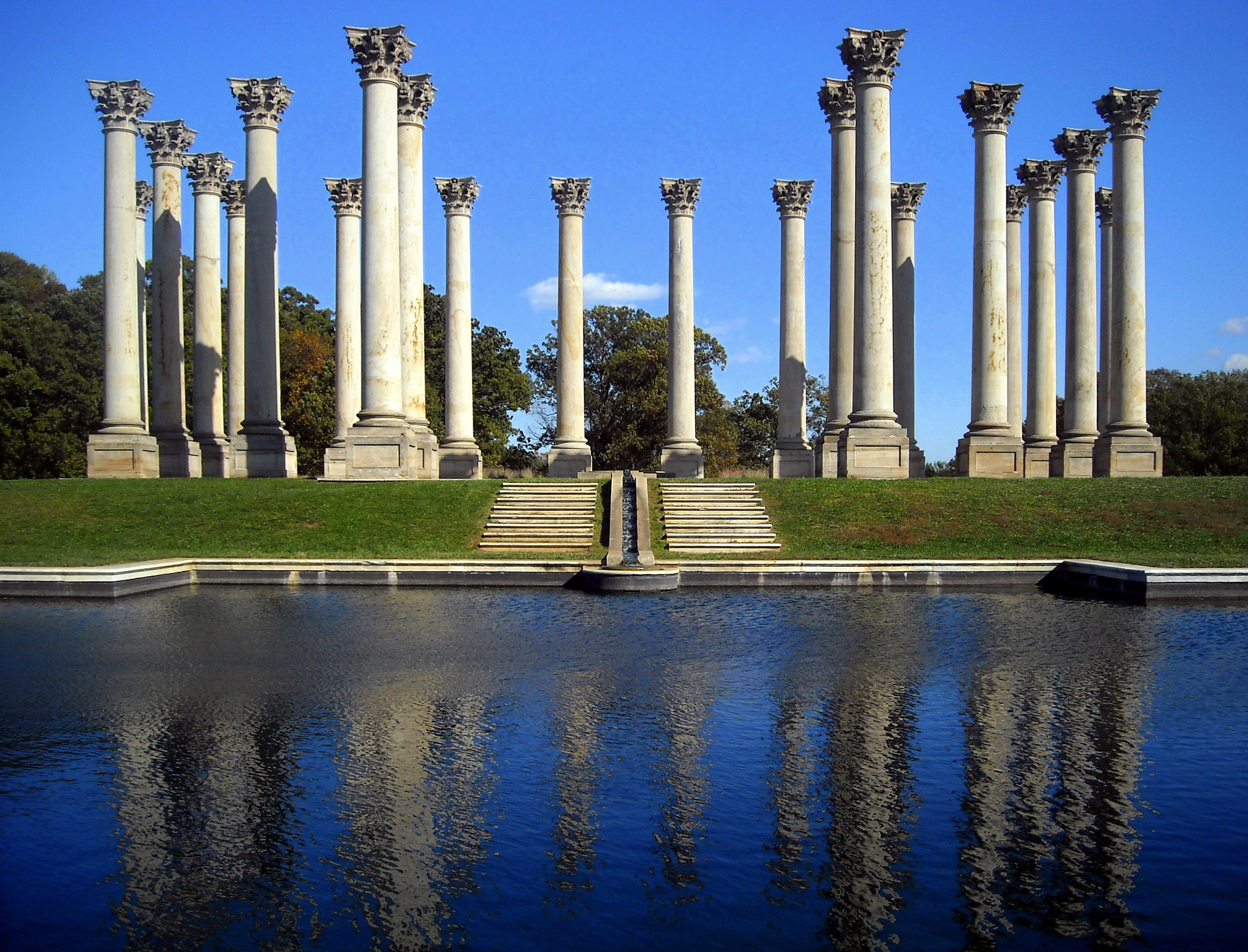
- The National Capitol Columns at the National Arboretum, saved by the Committee of 100 on the Federal City in 1959.
- Founded: 1923; 103 years ago
- Founder: Frederic A. Delano
- Tax ID no.: 51-0246296
- Legal status: 501(c)(3) nonprofit organization
- Headquarters: 945 G Street NW, Washington, DC 20001
- Chair: Kirby Vining
- Website: www.committeeof100.net

The Committee of 100 on the Federal City, locally referred to as the Committee of 100, is a private, nonprofit membership organization which promotes responsible land use and planning in Washington, D.C., and advocates adherence to the L'Enfant Plan and McMillan Plan as a guide to city growth. It is one of the most influential private land use planning bodies in Washington, D.C.

== About the organization ==
The goal of the Committee of 100 on the Federal City is to promote responsible land use and planning in Washington, D.C. The Washington Post has characterized the committee's approach as conservative, which is to say desiring to maintain the status quo. The committee believes its goals can best be achieved by adhering to the 1791 L'Enfant Plan and the 1902 McMillan Plan. The committee is also strongly interested in historic preservation.

The group is a 501(c)(3) nonprofit organization. Its members are primarily white collar professionals, although not necessarily professionals involved in urban planning, real estate development, or architecture.

The Committee of 100 is one of the oldest citizen-based urban planning groups in the United States. It is generally considered one of the most effective and highly influential private planning bodies in Washington, D.C. Reporter Lydia DePillis, writing for the Washington City Paper said in 2010, "Thanks to their relentless advocacy, D.C. remains a walking-scale city, retaining many of the elements of a healthy urban environment..." The committee is credited with keeping superhighways from being built in the city, and for winning passage of the Washington Metro in the face of intense congressional opposition. But it has also been criticized as too wedded to the status quo. Washington City Paper reporter Lydia DePillis characterized it in 2011 as "crusty" for its vehement opposition to change and its members as "civic worthies" for representing only wealthy, white residents. The Committee of 100 has strongly denied it is anti-development. Rather, it claims to merely want well-planned development.

=== Vision Awards ===
In 2002, the Committee of 100 on the Federal City began awarding an annual "Vision Award". The award recognizes "innovations and lifetime achievement in planning and land use by individuals or organizations in the District. A guiding principle is that planners follow the vision of the McMillan Plan and the city's original planner, Pierre Charles L'Enfant, while responding to modern challenges." Nominees are suggested by the public, and the award is generally bestowed in June.

Usually, anywhere from two to five Vision Awards are distributed. Additionally, one or two Lifetime Achievement Awards are also bestowed, as well as one Barbara Zartman Award for Planning and Zoning Advocacy. The Lifetime Achievement and Zartman awards are granted solely at the discretion of the Board of Trustees, and in some years no award is granted.

== History ==
On December 8, 1886, a group of businessmen residing in Washington's Northwest quadrant convened a meeting to appoint a "Committee of 100 Representative Citizens" to promote development of the city (then largely undeveloped woodlands). Although formed to promote the needs of citizens only in the Northwest quadrant, the organization quickly broadened its organizational structure and promoted a plan for the entire city. Its first meeting was May 16, 1887. this Committee of 100 disbanded in 1917.

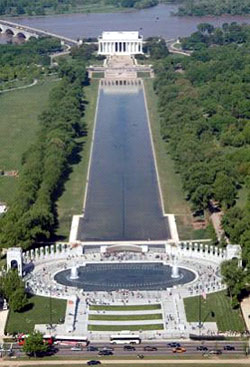
The Committee of 100 on the Federal City unsuccessfully opposed siting the National World War II Memorial in the center of the National Mall.

However, in 1922, Frederic A. Delano (uncle of Franklin D. Roosevelt) became president of the American Civic Association. Delano organized the Committee of 100 on the Federal City as a successor to the group which had disbanded in 1917, and became its first chairman. The Committee of 100 on the Federal City was founded in 1923. The Committee's goal was to support the 1791 L'Enfant Plan and the 1902 McMillan Plan for the development of the capital. One of its first legislative goals was to establish a parks and planning commission for the District of Columbia, which it achieved in 1924 when Congress created the National Capital Park Commission.

Delano stepped down as chairman at the end of 1944, and Owen Roberts, Associate Justice on the Supreme Court of the United States, was appointed his successor.

The Committee of 100 on the Federal City has been involved in numerous campaigns (pro and con) regarding buildings, roads, memorials, parks, and other architectural and planning features of Washington, D.C. Although the organization was less active in the 1960s than in the previous three decades, it became more active in the 1970s and 1980s. Among the campaigns it was involved in were:

- The 1949 opposition to the East Capitol Street Bridge.
- Opposition in the 1950s and 1960s to construction of the Inner Loop freeway system in downtown D.C.
- The 1955 effort to preserve the Old Patent Office Building.
- Opposition in the 1950s and 1960s to placing the proposed National Arts and Cultural Center on the National Mall.
- The 1959 effort to preserve the marble columns removed from the East Front of the United States Capitol building.
- Opposed in 1963 the proposed dam at the Great Falls of the Potomac River.
- Preservation of the historic structures on Lafayette Square in 1961.
- Supported the 1966 Washington Metropolitan Area Transit Authority interstate compact.
- Opposed in the late 1960s and early 1970s the proposed Three Sisters Bridge.
- Opposed in the early 1980s the underground location for the Arthur M. Sackler Gallery and Freer Gallery of Art.
- Opposed the demolition of the Greyhound Bus Terminal at 1100 New York Avenue, and supported its preservation into the facade of the new building.
- Opposed in 1984 the Techworld office building development near Mount Vernon Square.
- Opposed in 1987 the proposed glass skylight addition to the Postal Square Building.
- Opposed in 1993 the construction of a children's theme park on Kingman Island.
- Opposed in 1993 the proposed destruction of parkland at Kingman Island to build additional parking lots for RFK Stadium.
- Opposed in 2000 the siting of the National World War II Memorial in the center of the National Mall.

One of the Committee of 100's most influential chairmen was Charles David Grinnell. A worker with an electrical firm, Grinnell became involved in the committee's efforts in the 1960s and 1970s to stop construction of the Inner Loop. When the District of Columbia achieved home rule on January 1, 1975, the city established Advisory Neighborhood Commissions (ANCs) to empower local citizens on a wide variety of zoning, planning, and other issues. Grinnell became the first chair of his local ANC. Grinnell was elected chair of the Committee of 100 on the Federal City in 1983 and served until 1987. As chairman, he opposed the construction of Techworld and pushed for the restoration of Glover-Archbold Park.

The Committee of 100's records were donated to The George Washington University in 1986. They are currently under the care of GWU's Special Collections Research Center, located in the university's Estelle and Melvin Gelman Library.

== Recent issues ==
The Committee of 100 on the Federal City is active on a wide range of issues.

=== Opposition to DC Streetcar ===
The Committee of 100 on the Federal City has been a vocal opponent of the DC Streetcar system. Although not opposed to streetcars per se, the group has taken issue with what it calls poor planning and inadequate financial planning for the system, which city officials wish to build throughout the District of Columbia. Additionally, the Committee of 100 is absolutely opposed to constructing overhead lines to power the streetcars. Although federal law prohibits overhead lines in the boundaries of the Old Federal City and in historic Georgetown, the city has proposed using them everywhere else in D.C. The Committee of 100 on the Federal City has instead pushed for battery-powered streetcars or installation of a conduit current collection system, in which a metal prong (known as a "plow") draws current from an electrified rail buried in the street. In May 2010, the D.C. City Council removed all $49 million in streetcar funding from the city budget. The Washington Post reported that streetcar supporters blamed Sarah Campbell, a member of the Committee of 100 and the budget director for the city council, for the decision. Campbell vehemently denied the accusation, saying she did not oppose overhead wires but was concerned that the city had not come up with an adequate funding method for the project yet. A month later, the city council passed legislation allowing overhead wires along Benning Road and H Street NE, but banning them from the area around the National Mall and Pennsylvania Avenue NW. The legislation also created a process for soliciting public input on the use of overhead wires elsewhere in the city. The Committee of 100 said the legislation was an improvement, but still pressed for no overhead wires and for an improved funding plan.

In 2011, the Committee of 100 issued its own report on the DC Streetcar system. The report generally approved of the proposed routes, although it had concerns about three routes and the H Street route's connection with Union Station. The report concluded that the city had not adequately thought through the construction and operational costs of the system, and that the city should take measures to ensure that housing remains affordable along streetcar routes. It called for the city to purchase only those streetcars that could be easily upgraded to wireless power, and for enactment of new laws to ensure citizen input into the streetcar project.

Claiming that it and other citizen groups had been kept out of streetcar planning, in January 2011 the Committee of 100 asked incoming mayor Vincent C. Gray to fire Gabe Klein, D.C. Department of Transportation (DDOT) director, and Harriet Tregoning, Office of Planning director. Lydia DePillis, writing for the Washington City Paper, said the group's demand was because it believed Kleing had disregarded their input and pursued a smart growth agenda which the Committee of 100 disapproved of.

=== Opposition to the Dwight D. Eisenhower Memorial ===
The Committee of 100 has voiced considerable opposition to Frank Gehry's design for the proposed Dwight D. Eisenhower Memorial. The committee was active in attempting to shape the design criteria adopted by the Dwight D. Eisenhower Memorial Commission. The committee strongly opposed locating the memorial on Maryland Avenue SW between 4th and 6th Streets SW. This location, the organization says, blocks L'Enfant's planned vista of the U.S. Capitol along Maryland Avenue, and disrupts the character of the L'Enfant Plaza/Federal Center area.

The Committee of 100 also compared the competition which led to the selection of the Gehry design to the two competitions in the 1950s and 1960s which resulted in monumental, Modernist designs for the Franklin Delano Roosevelt Memorial. The committee harshly criticized the closed competition and called for a new competition open to all.

The Committee of 100 has also been deeply critical of the Gehry design itself. It called the approved design "a drive-in movie screen displaying a black-and-white image of Kansas".

=== Support for D.C. building height restrictions ===
The Committee of 100 on the Federal City has for decades rejected any changes to the Heights of Buildings Act of 1910. The law, enacted by Congress, limits buildings in the city to the width of the widest street in front of it plus 20 feet (6.1 m), or 130 feet (40,000 mm) on any "business" street. The organization strongly disputes the rationale generally offered for the law's enactment. Committee members in 2010 largely rejected a historian's study that concluded fire safety limitations (such as the height of ladders) was the reason for enactment of the law. The position of the Committee of 100 is that the need to preserve the city's aesthetics (low buildings, wide avenues, vistas) was the overriding cause.

In 1988, when Congress considered legislation to allow building heights to rise slightly, Committee of 100 chairman Don McGrath claimed Congress and developers wanted to "skyscraper this city." The New York Times called this "hyperbole".

The committee vigorously opposed in 2012 any move to relax the building height limit. When the United States House of Representatives held hearings on the height limit's effect on redevelopment in the District of Columbia, Laura Richards testified for the Committee of 100 against any changed. "[L]ifting the height limit will alter irretrievably the District's historic, welcoming scale without producing upside benefits," she said. "The Committee of 100 therefore believes that the Height Act should remain undisturbed and should be enforced vigorously." Richards implied that city residents overwhelmingly supported retaining the height limitation as is, and that the legislation made "the frantic life of our modern world...more bearable."

In November 2012, the National Capitol Planning Commission said it would study the effect which the building height limitations had on redevelopment in Washington, D.C. Committee of 100 chairman George Clark categorically ruled out any change as acceptable. The wealthy attorney said he spoke for residents of the wealthy Hillcrest enclave and the poor of neighborhood of Anacostia and said that citizens of Anacostia do not want to be treated "as second class citizens and have their view sheds blocked". Clark also said he spoke for visitors to the city, none of whom wanted to see tall buildings.

Others, such as University of Maryland professor of architecture Roger K. Lewis, argue that the height limits constrain redevelopment and could be relaxed in areas such as the Anacostia River waterfront and around outlying Metro stations without harming the city's character. The Wall Street Journal reported in May 2012 that relaxation of the height act was being advocated by developers. With 24,000,000 square feet (2,200,000 m^{2}) of development in the downtown core between 1997 and 2010, only 5,000,000 square feet (460,000 m^{2}) of space remains. Yet, with the city's population increasing more than 8 percent since 2000 and surrounding neighborhoods likely to be completely built up and built out within 10 to 15 years, the only place for construction to go is up. D.C. Mayor Vincent Gray has proposed allowing buildings in the old Federal City to rise by just 15 feet (4.6 m) (to accommodate mechanical equipment), although buildings constructed further away from the core could see significantly higher height limits. Developers argue that without the higher building limitations, the city will become too expensive to conduct business in. Christopher Leinberger, a real estate developer and visiting fellow at the Brookings Institution argued, "This is purely a supply-demand question, and we need more supply."

=== Other issues ===
The Committee of 100 has criticized the placement of Capital Bikeshare stations for not asking for citizen input and for poorly advertising stations when they are established, opposed the establishment of a minimum number of parking spaces in each neighborhood, supported the right of neighborhood residents to have parking rights in their neighborhood, and opposed tax incentives for real estate developers.

The committee won a 2011 battle to change the city's billboard advertising laws. The city had proposed allowing some large buildings to hang advertising from their exterior walls. In exchange, the city would eliminate many existing billboards, which were grandfathered into the law banning billboards in the city. A compromise to eliminate some billboards from the city? Committee of 100 chairman George Clark called the proposal a "sellout to the billboard industry" and said the proposal "makes me think it is 1984 or that we are in Wonderland with Alice". The proposal was defeated, largely due to lobbying by the Committee of 100.

The committee also opposed numerous changes proposed in 2011 to the city zoning code. In the first wholesale revision to the zoning code in 54 years, the mayoral Office of Planning and Economic Development proposed eliminating minimum parking requirements in residential neighborhoods; permitting buildings on small lots to build to the very boundary of their land; and eliminating zoning for different commercial uses (to allow unlimited any commercial use in a commercial zones). The committee testified in a city council hearing that the changes would "disrupt" neighborhoods and orderly economic development.

In 2012, the Committee of 100 on the Federal City expressed its concern over plans to cover over the railway tracks north of Union Station and construct a number of mixed use residential, office, retail, and hotel buildings there. Along with the Capitol Hill Restoration Society, the D.C. Preservation League, and the National Trust for Historic Preservation, the Committee of 100 formed the Union Station Preservation Coalition. The coalition immediately issued an eight-point plan aimed at preserving the train station in its current form, ensuring that the public had frequent and significant input into the project, and restoring pedestrian areas.

In 2015, the Committee unsuccessfully sought to block CSX Transportation's reconstruction of the Virginia Avenue Tunnel in Southeast Washington.

== Political conflicts ==
The Committee of 100 on the Federal City has had a long-running dispute with advocates of the New Urbanism urban design movement, and in particular with the blog Greater Greater Washington and its founder, David Alpert. Alpert routinely characterizes the Committee on 100 as "a barrier to positive change". Richard Layman, a D.C. transportation planner, accused Alpert and other New Urbanism advocates in 2013 of not appreciating all the positive things the Committee on 100 had accomplished.

The feud with Greater Greater Washington (GGW) erupted in 2008, when the Committee of 100 claimed (without naming names) that GGW had slurred the organization as "a gaggle of aging couch potatoes bitterly clinging to cars and big houses". In its newsletter, the committee attacked GGW as wanting "to recreate Washington, DC as a highdensity destination for the healthy, wealthy and young" and demanding "multi-family mixed-use development on every available scrap of land without regard to need, scale, balance, or the opinions of impacted District residents. This is coupled with hostility toward all automobile use, whether or not any other form of transportation is available. To live in this 'smart' vision of the District, you should be willing to forego elbow room and to accept that a neighbor who enlarges his house may be literally an arms length away." Organization chairman George Clark Alpert accused GGW of wanting to "turn D.C. into a Manhattan-esque metropolis". Meg Maguire, chair of the Committee of 100's subcommittee on street cars, blamed Alpert for caricaturing the Committee of 100 as "anti" everything.

In November 2010, GGW began lobbying incoming D.C. mayor Vincent Gray to retain Gabe Klein (the outgoing administration's transportation director) and Harriet Tregoning (the former administration's planning director). The Committee of 100 immediately began a campaign to get Gray to dump both officials. Gray declined to keep Klein, but retained Tregoning.

During the 2012 zoning regulation revision debate, found itself pitted against New Urbanism advocates who wanted zoning rules to permit denser development that emphasized walking and a reliance on mass transit. The Washington Post reported that most of the Committee of 100's membership lived in the wealthy Upper Northwest residential area, where people rely primarily on personal automobiles (rather than mass transit) and curbside parking is readily available. Alma Gates, chair of the Committee of 100's zoning subcommittee, noted that committee members opposed such zoning changes because their neighborhoods have poor Metrobus service and high-density development would create a parking crisis in these areas.

== Bibliography ==
- Bednar, Michael J. L'Enfant's Legacy: Public Open Spaces in Washington, D.C. Baltimore, Md.: Johns Hopkins University Press, 2006.
- Berg, Scott W. Grand Avenues: The Story of Pierre Charles L'Enfant, the French Visionary Who Designed Washington, D.C. New York: Vintage Books, 2007.
- Gillette, Howard. Between Justice and Beauty: Race, Planning, and the Failure of Urban Policy in Washington, D.C. Philadelphia: University of Pennsylvania Press, 2006.
- Hatcher, Ed. "Washington's Nineteenth-Century Citizens' Associations and the Senate Park Commission Plan." Washington History. 14:2 (Fall/Winter 2002/2003).
- James, Harlean. Land Planning in the United States for the City, State and Nation. New York: MacMillan Company, 1926.
- MacGovern, Stephen J. The Politics of Downtown Development: Dynamic Political Cultures in San Francisco and Washington, D.C. Lexington, Ky.: University Press of Kentucky, 1998.
- Robin, Peggy. Saving the Neighborhood: You Can Fight Developers and Win. Rockville, Md.: Woodbine House, 1990.
