= Whitney Young Memorial Bridge =

Bridge crossing the Anacostia River in Washington, D.C.

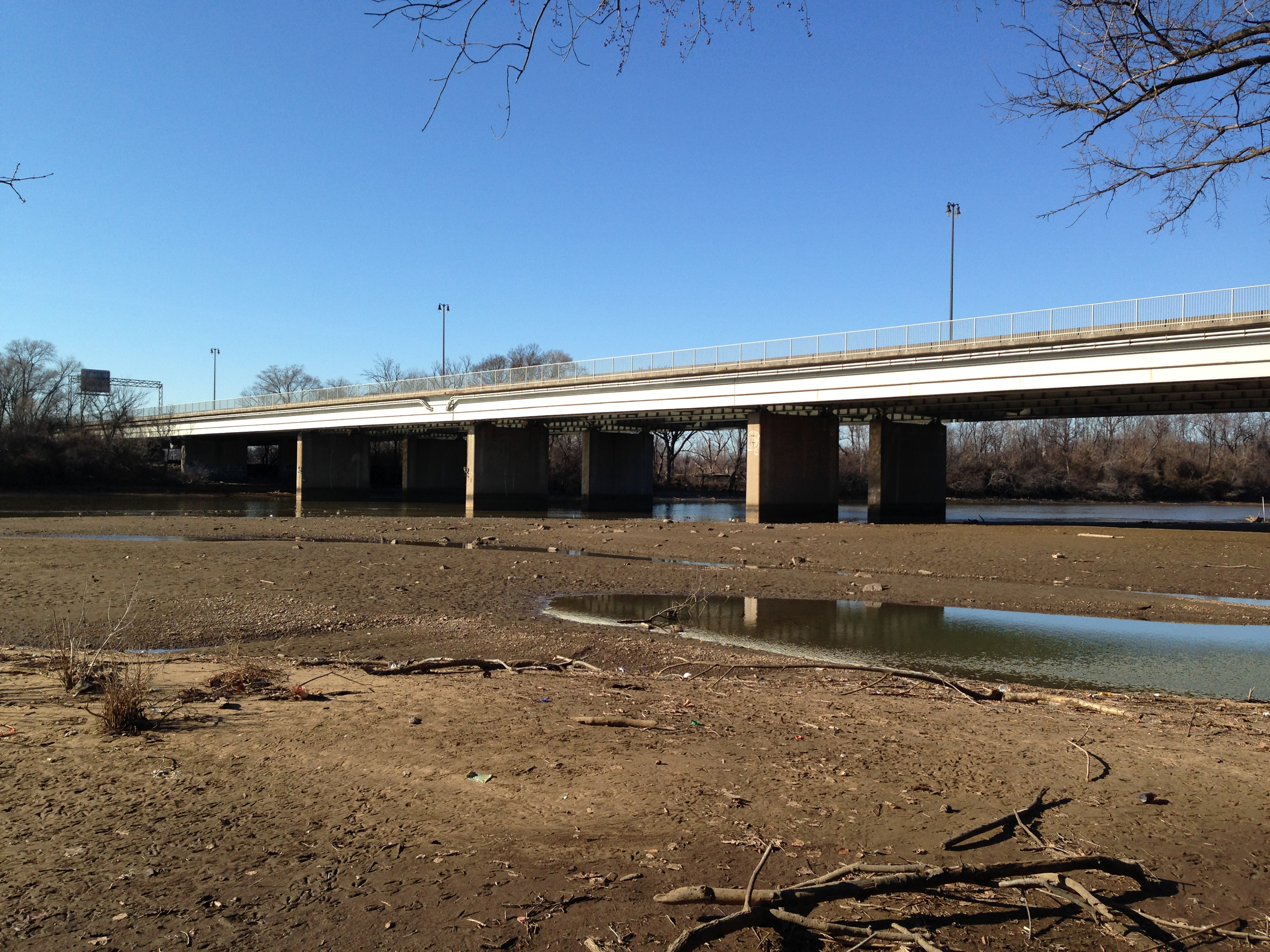
- The Whitney Young Bridge from the south in 2015
- Coordinates: 38.889764°N 76.964979°W
- Carries: Motor vehicles, pedestrians
- Crosses: Anacostia River
- Locale: Washington, D.C., U.S.
- Official name: Whitney M. Young Jr. Memorial Bridge
- Other name: East Capitol Street Bridge
- Maintained by: District of Columbia Department of Transportation
- Preceded by: Ethel Kennedy Bridge
- Followed by: John Philip Sousa Bridge

Characteristics
- Design: Plate girder bridge
- Total length: 1,910 feet (580 m)
- Width: 86 feet (26 m)

History
- Designer: J.E. Greiner Company of Baltimore, MD
- Opened: November 10, 1955; 70 years ago

Statistics
- Daily traffic: 66,200 vehicles per day (1996)

Location
- Interactive map of Whitney Young Memorial Bridge

The Whitney Young Memorial Bridge is a bridge that carries East Capitol Street across the Anacostia River and Kingman Lake in Washington, D.C. in the United States. Finished in 1955, it was originally called the East Capitol Street Bridge. It was renamed for civil rights activist Whitney Young in early 1974. The bridge is 1,800 feet (550 m) long, its six lanes are 82 feet (25 m) wide, and it has 15 spans resting on 14 piers. It passes over the southern end of Kingman Island and splits into C Street NE and Independence Avenue SE at the site of the former Robert F. Kennedy Memorial Stadium and the New Stadium at RFK Campus on its western end.

== Planning ==
The need for a new bridge spanning the Anacostia River was first identified in 1949 after worsening traffic at Barney Circle led to widespread citizen complaints. The bridge was proposed to cross the Anacostia by extending East Capitol Street over the river. This bridge was opposed by the National Capital Park and Planning Commission (NCPPC), which asked that a bridge be built by extending Massachusetts Avenue SE through the undeveloped Hill East/Reservation 13 area and connecting it with its namesake street in the Greenway neighborhood on the east side of the river. The Commission was supported by an influential group of business people and civic leaders known as the Committee of 100 on the Federal City. D.C. officials, however, opposed this route for fear of the negative effects it would have on nearby Gallinger Hospital (later renamed D.C. General Hospital). On December 29, 1949, the three D.C. Commissioners (then the sole government of the District of Columbia) approved a bridge at East Capitol Street.

But just three weeks later, the Frederick Douglass Memorial Bridge opened across the Anacostia River, alleviating traffic congestion in southeast. A few days later, the NCPPC voted to suspend approval for any new bridge across the Anacostia River until traffic patterns and congestion around the existing bridges were resolved and the need for a new span made clear. Federal engineers said that study would take two months. Members of the United States House of Representatives from the state of Maryland, whose state would be impacted by eastbound traffic from any new bridge, favored the East Capitol Street site and encouraged the D.C. Commissioners to bring the fight to Congress for resolution. In early March 1950, the Subcommittee on District Appropriations of the House Committee on Appropriations turned down a request to fund a study of the Massachusetts Avenue site, and the Subcommittee on the District of Columbia of the House Committee on Expenditures in the Executive Departments held hearings which supported the D.C. Commissioners. The Subcommittee on the District of Columbia estimated that reconstructing ramps and reconfiguring traffic patterns around existing bridges would cost $9.5 million, while building a new bridge would cost about the same. Federal highway officials also testified that the bridge would help ease access to Maryland Route 214, which was originally planned to connect with the Baltimore–Washington Parkway at the District line but which had been forced into a more southerly direction. Members of Congress inspected both the Massachusetts Avenue SE and East Capitol Street sites, and the House Subcommittee approved the East Capitol span in mid-March 1950.

A $395,000 contract studying the two sites was granted to the J. E. Greiner Company of Baltimore, Maryland, on September 9, 1950. The company was also asked to study whether the approaches from the west to the East Capitol Street span would travel along that street or be divided between Independence Avenue SE and C Street NE. D.C. highway officials gave their approval to the East Capitol Street span on May 1, 1950. The Greiner Co. had recommended a $2.7 million steel plate girder bridge. The bridge was designed to pass under Minnesota Avenue SE and the Baltimore and Potomac Railroad tracks on the east side of the river and connect with Kenilworth Avenue NE. The cost of the eastern approaches was estimated at $6.7 million. The western approaches would split over Kingman Island and connect Independence Avenue SE and C Street NE. Work on the western approaches was estimated at $2.3 million. The NCPPC approved the plan on May 10, and the United States Army Corps of Engineers did so on August 20. But after a final site visit from the NCPPC in September 1951, the approaches were moved slightly westward. The new approaches required dredging 650,000 cubic yards (500,000 m^{3}) from Kingman Lake and replacing it with sand and gravel to create a gently curving peninsula that extended 800 feet (240 m) into the western side of the lake. 1.3 million cubic yards (990,000 m^{3}) of fill would be used to raise the peninsula 35 feet (11 m) above the low water mark, and the western approaches built on the new land.

== Construction ==
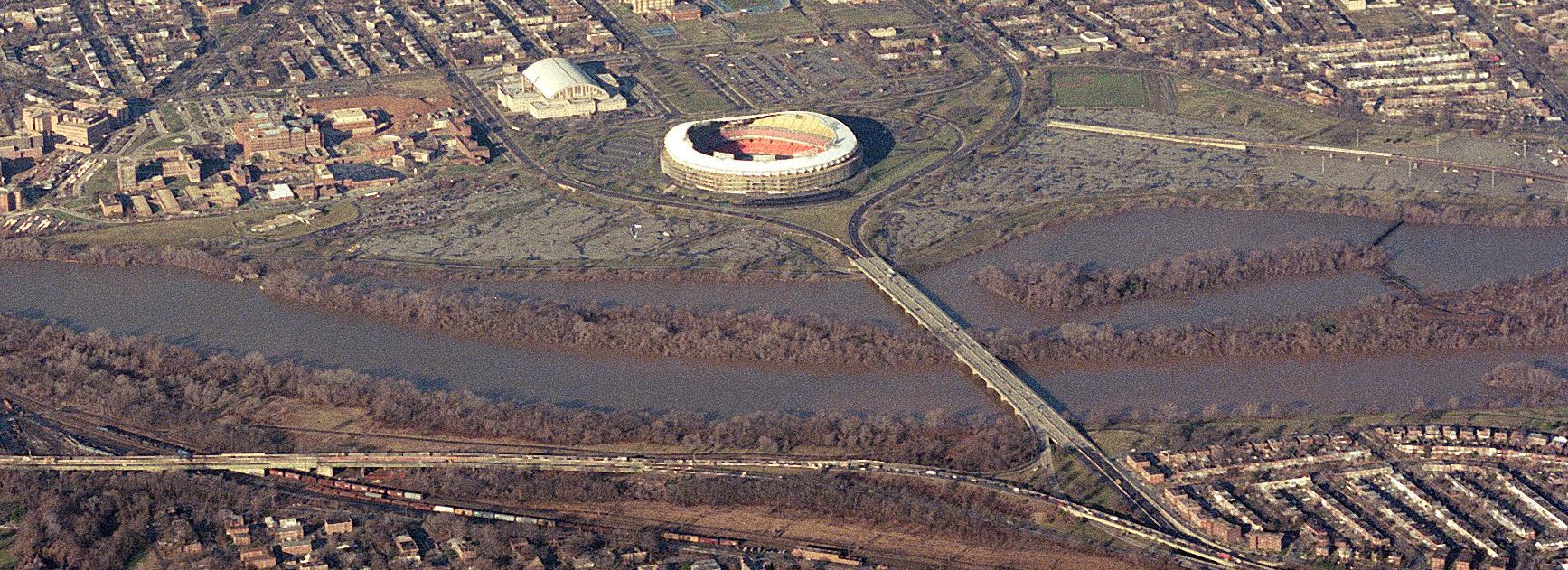
Whitney Young Memorial Bridge (center of image) leading from RFK Stadium across Kingman Lake and Kingman Island to the eastern shore of the Anacostia River, pictured in 1991

Bids for the entire $12 million construction project were solicited on May 23, 1952. The Arlington, Virginia, firm of J.A. LaPorte Inc. won the dredging contract, and the D.C. firm of Morauer & Hartzell won the fill contract. The work was expected to take 15 months. The NCPPC approved the city's plans to connect the new bridge to Kenilworth Avenue NE on December 13, 1952, and a $5.5 million plan to widen Kenwilworth Avenue into a divided, 10-lane freeway on March 24, 1953. D.C. officials paid $250,000 to buy the land for the exit ramps onto Kenilworth Avenue. Construction on the western approaches was blocked for a month after residents of Suitland, Maryland, (upset by loud trucks passing down their streets) won a month-long restraining order against the project so that contractors could devise and implement a noise-abatement program.

Construction on the bridge itself began in 1953. Baltimore Contractors, Inc. won the $1.2 million contract to build the bridge's substructure, and DeLuca Davis Construction (also of Baltimore) won the $2.2 million contract to the build the superstructure. District officials sought approval from Congress to spend $4.3 million in District of Columbia highway budget funds in September 1953. The city also applied for $4.2 million in federal matching highway funds to help finish the bridge. Driving of piles for the foundation began in December 1953. About 120 individuals helped construct the bridge deck.

All the substructure and most up the superstructure had been completed by August 1954. Widening of East Capitol Street east of the river was also completed in 1954. Completion was expected in October 1955. By late September 1954, 73 percent of the superstructure had been completed and only stone protections for the piers remained to be finished for the substructure. District transportation officials also said that ramps and overpasses for the Kenilworth Avenue exits were almost complete by this time as well, but the railroad track underpass (being built by S. Wikstrom Co.) was only 46 percent complete and not due for final work until November 1955. Officials said the bridge would open once Kenny Construction finished connecting the railroad underpass to East Capitol Street in the east.

Kenny Construction began work on the final $2.3 million phase of the bridge project on November 6, 1954. Work was due to end in 540 days. The Greenway Apartments (located at 3539 A Street SE) obtained an injunction in February 1955 stopping work for a month on the project after alleging that the excavations for the road would affect the foundation of their building.

The East Capitol Street Bridge opened on November 10, 1955. Tippy Stringer, a local television personality at WRC-TV (and later the wife of NBC news anchor Chet Huntley), cut the ribbon opening the bridge. Metropolitan Police Department Chief Robert V. Murray drove the first vehicle across the bridge. About 300 people attended the ceremony, which was held in a driving rain. Also present were all three D.C. Commissioners and Rep. George Hyde Fallon (chair of the House Committee on Public Works).

== Bridge history and renaming ==
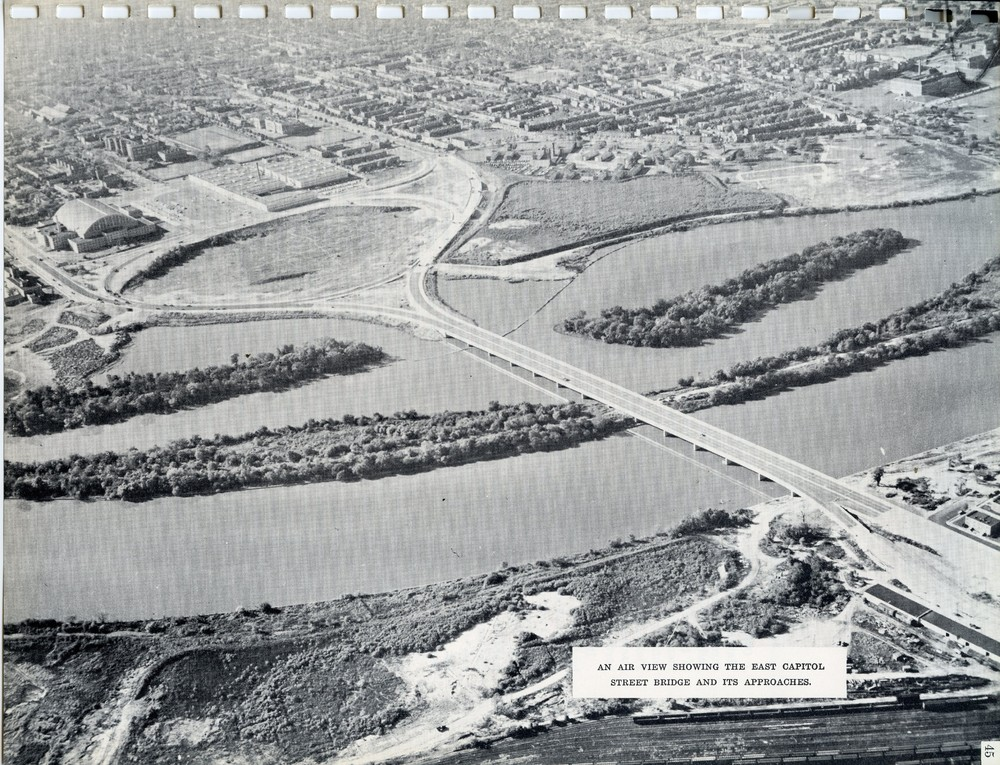
Aerial view of the East Capitol Street Bridge (now the Whitney Young) in 1955

The bridge and approaches on the west side were built through what had been planned as Anacostia Park, a recreation area and National Sports Center. Construction of the bridge required redesign of that park, and abandonment of the Kingman Lake feature of the plan. The western approach included an ellipse that was to serve as a parade ground, but by 1957 planners were already viewing it as a stadium site.

In 1957, the Kenilworth Expressway was constructed to connect the bridge to the new Baltimore-Washington Parkway and the eastern approach was changed to include ramps between the two. This project rendered the downstream sidewalk obsolete for more than 50 years. By 1964, the Anacostia Freeway had been extended north to meet the Kenilworth Expressway, which was later subsumed by the freeway.

In 1961, Robert F. Kennedy Memorial Stadium (later renamed RFK) opened on the former parade grounds in the western ellipse, parking lots filled the land on both sides of the approach and connections to the parking were built as part of the stadium.

In early 1974, the East Capitol Street Bridge was renamed the Whitney M. Young, Jr. Memorial Bridge in honor of Whitney Young, an activist during the Civil Rights Movement and National Urban League Executive Director .

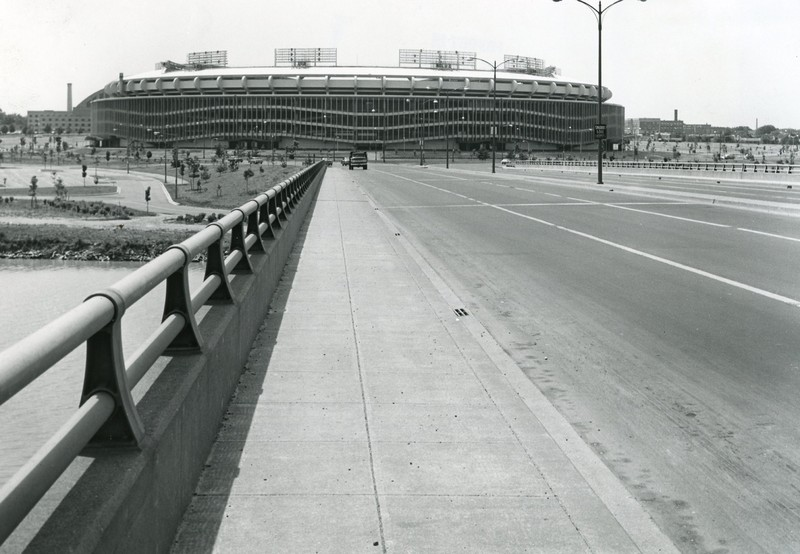
Whitney Young Memorial Bridge leading to RFK Stadium, 1965

In 1980, District officials spent $8.5 million reconstructing the deck of the bridge and adding safety improvements. The bridge was carrying about 56,000 vehicles a day at that time. One side of the span was closed at a time, with two-way traffic proceeding on the open portion. Safety improvements included adding a median wall and barriers between the road and the sidewalk and replacing the barrier on the outside of the sidewalk with a higher fence to prevent suicides. It also narrowed the sidewalks to 3 feet 9 inches (1.14 m).

The bridge continued to have work done as it neared a half century of use. The roadway's condition was noticeably rough in 1997, and so in 2004, the District of Columbia resurfaced the deck and made repairs to three piers at a cost of $3.4 million. In 2009, the Federal Highway Administration's National Bridge Inventory rated the bridge as "not deficient." The District of Columbia Department of Transportation (DDOT) estimated that by 2015, the bridge would be carrying only about 60,000 vehicles per day—about 10 percent fewer than in 1996.

In 2019, the District began another rehabilitation project for the bridge. The work includes repairs to both the substructure and the superstructure, rebuilding and widening (to 6 foot 3.5 inches) the sidewalks and their approaches, repair to the bridge rail, installation of new overhead signs and other small repairs.

The East Capitol Street Bridge saw its first suicide when one-legged 48-year-old Adolphius L. Groom leapt from the bridge on the morning of July 13, 1967. The first major accident on the bridge occurred on March 7, 1969, when two vehicles collided head-on on the span, killing two people. Another major crash occurred on September 18, 1971, when a vehicle on the bridge was rear-ended, killing one of the occupants. In October 1977, a man traveling at high speed across the bridge rear-ended another automobile and died. Another suicide occurred on December 16, 1986, when a man leapt from the bridge and landed on a moving vehicle below. Another traffic fatality occurred on the bridge on November 13, 1986, when a driver struck a disabled vehicle on the bridge and was himself rear-ended by a third car. In February 1990, an ambulance taking a patient to the hospital was struck on the bridge by an automobile traveling at about 100 mph, leaving the driver and passenger in the vehicle in critical condition.

The bridge was also the scene of a famous rape and murder in D.C. history. On October 1, 1971, Richard Anthony Lee was accused of kidnapping Robert L. Ammidown and his wife, Linda E. Ammidown; forcing them to drive to the East Capitol Street Bridge overpass above the railroad tracks; and raping and killing Linda Ammidown. Police later learned that Robert Ammidown had hired Lee to kill Linda in a plot to inherit her substantial fortune and win custody of their 12-year-old son. Four men who had learned of the plot were attempting to extort money from Ammidown. In separate trials, Judge John J. Sirica found Ammidown and Lee guilty of murder. Ammidown received a sentence of life in prison, but Lee received the death penalty. Eight days after sentence was imposed, the United States Supreme Court held in Furman v. Georgia, 408 U.S. 238 (1972) that death penalty laws in the United States constituted cruel and unusual punishment and thus were unconstitutional. Lee's sentence was changed to life in prison. The Court later upheld new death penalty laws in Gregg v. Georgia, 428 U.S. 153 (1976). The Ammidown/Lee trial was the last death penalty case in the District of Columbia. (The District of Columbia abolished the death penalty in 1981.)

In 1982, D.C. officials proposed building the Barney Circle Freeway, which would have linked Interstate 695 (which dead-ended at a junction with Pennsylvania Avenue SE) to the Whitney Young Memorial Bridge by building a six-lane freeway from Barney Circle to the bridge through Anacostia Park. The plan would also have built a new bridge across the Anacostia River from Barney Circle to connect with the Anacostia Freeway near E Street SE. After numerous delays and strong citizen opposition, the Barney Circle Freeway project was cancelled in 1997.

=== Deficient rating ===
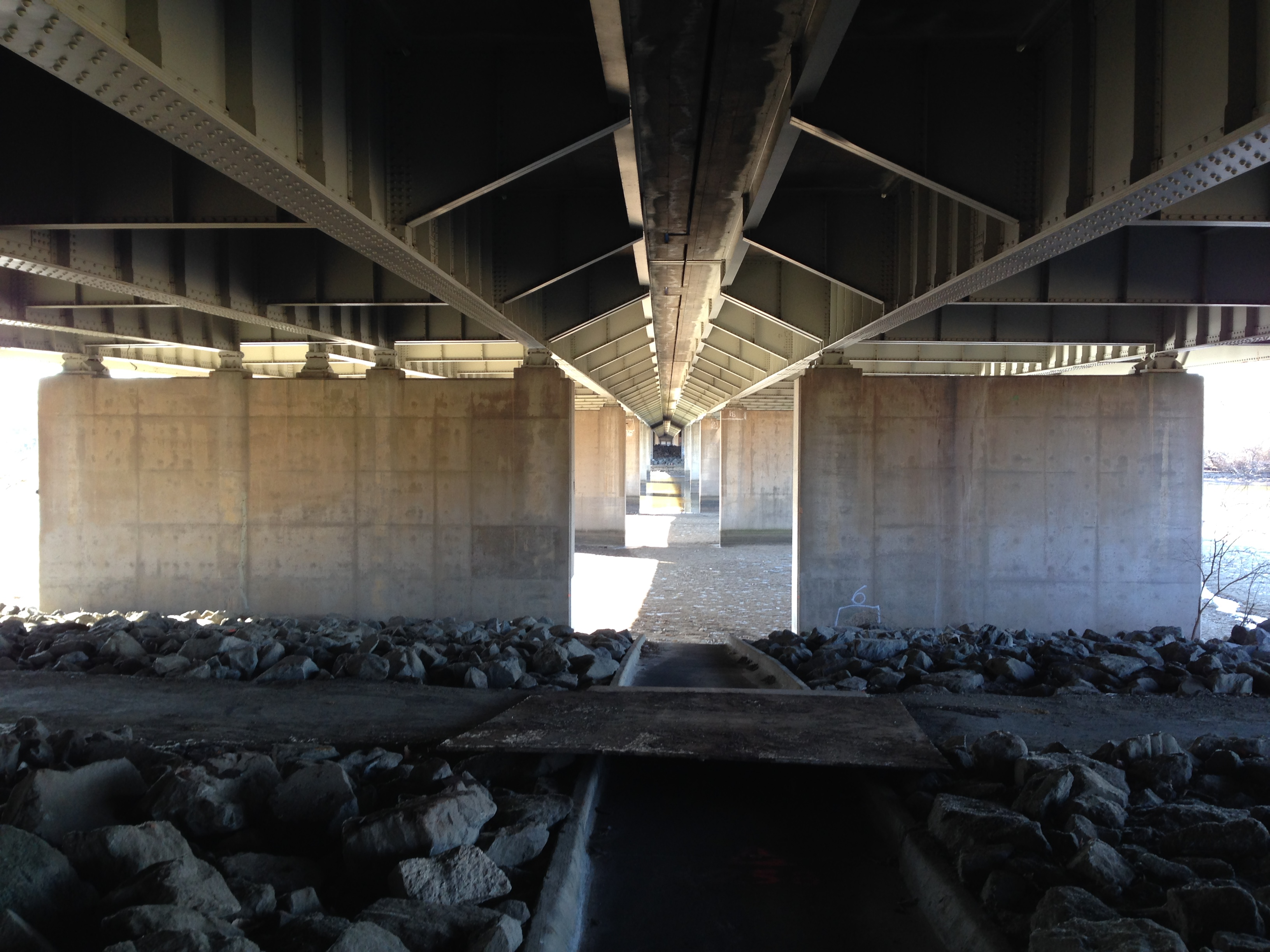
Underside of the bridge in 2015

A federal report in March 1972 listed the East Capitol Street Bridge as one of several "deficient" bridges needing repair in the District of Columbia. D.C. officials disagreed with the report's conclusions, arguing they had not submitted complete data on the bridge.

In September 2013, United States Department of Transportation (USDOT) rated the Whitney Young Memorial Bridge both "fracture critical" and "structurally deficient". The "fracture critical" rating meant that the if a single component of the bridge fails, the entire bridge would collapse. The "structurally deficient" rating meant that at least one major component of the bridge was in "poor" condition. DDOT officials said they had reinforced the bridge, but these temporary measures were not enough to cause either USDOT assessment to be lifted. DDOT said it had no means of funding any permanent repairs.

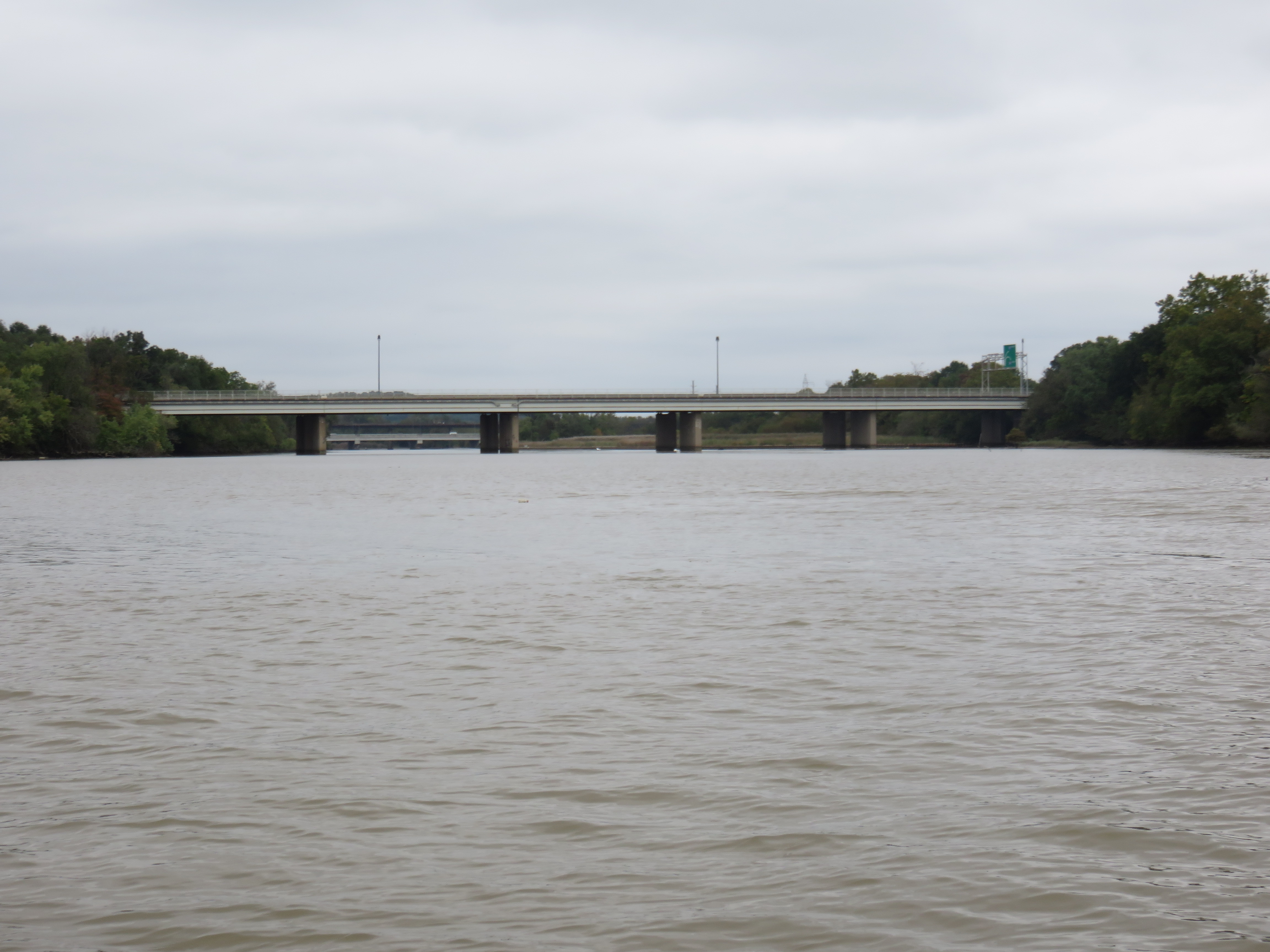
The bridge from the water in 2018

The Washington Post in April 2014 called the Whitney Young Memorial Bridge one of the three "busiest deficient bridges" in the District of Columbia, along with Arlington Memorial Bridge and Key Bridge. DDOT began an extensive program of preventive maintenance to ensure the bridge did not deteriorate further in advance of a planned 2018 major rehabilitation. DDOT said it would inspect the bridge again at the end of 2015 in order to reassess the bridge's condition.
