= Kingman Lake =

Artificial lake in Washington, D.C.

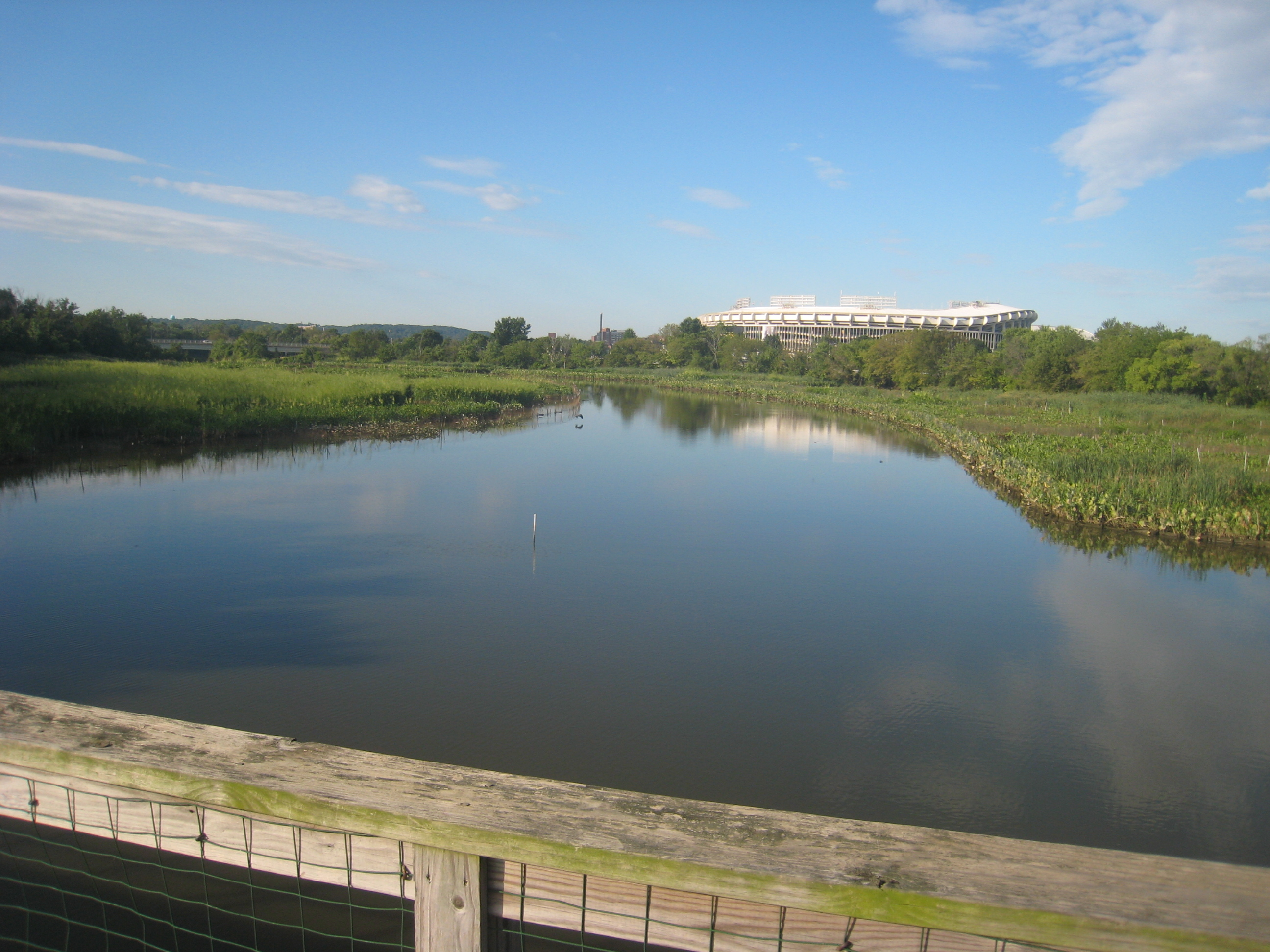
- A view of Kingman Lake. RFK Stadium can be seen in the distance.

- Location within the District of Columbia
- Location: Washington, D.C., U.S.
- Coordinates: 38°53′47.41″N 76°57′55.91″W
- Type: Artificial lake
- Primary inflows: Anacostia River
- Primary outflows: Anacostia, evaporation
- Basin countries: United States
- Built: 1920
- Surface area: 110 acres (0.45 km^{2})
- Average depth: 6 feet (1.8 m)
- Islands: Kingman and Heritage Island

Kingman Lake is a 110-acre (0.45 km^{2}) artificial lake located in the Anacostia River in Washington, D.C., U.S. The lake was created in 1920 when the United States Army Corps of Engineers used material dredged from the Anacostia River to create Kingman Island. The Corps of Engineers largely blocked the flow of the Anacostia River to the west of Kingman Island, creating the lake (although some water is permitted to enter the lake to prevent it from completely evaporating and to refresh its waters). Kingman Lake is currently managed by the National Park Service. The former RFK Stadium and the future New Stadium at RFK Campus are directly to the west.

== Early history of the lake ==
Prior to the arrival of European settlers in the 18th century, the Anacostia River was a fast-flowing and relatively silt-free river with very few mudflats or marshes. White settlers cleared much of the surrounding forest for farmland, however, and extensive soil erosion led to a heavy load of silt and effluent in the Anacostia. In 1805, local landowner Benjamin Stoddert built a wooden bridge over the Anacostia River at the present site of Benning Bridge. The bridge was sold to Thomas Ewell, who in the 1820s sold it to William Benning. Thereafter the structure was known as Benning's Bridge (or Benning Bridge). The wooden bridge was rebuilt several times after 1805. This included construction of a steel bridge in 1892. The construction of Benning and other bridges and the diversion of inflowing streams to agricultural use also slowed the river's current, allowing much of the silt to settle and be deposited.

Between 1860 and the late 1880s, large mudflats ("the Anacostia flats") formed on both banks of the Anacostia River due to this deforestation and runoff. At this time, the city allowed its sewage to pour untreated into the Anacostia. Marsh grass began growing in the flats, trapping the sewage and leading public health experts to conclude that the flats were unsanitary. Health officials also feared that the flats were a prime breeding ground for malaria- and yellow fever-carrying mosquitoes. By 1876, a large mudflat had formed just to the south of the western end of Benning Bridge, and another mudflat about 740 feet (230 m) wide had developed in the river south of that. By 1883, a stream named "Succabel's Gut" traversed the upper flat and another dubbed "Turtle Gut" the lower, and both flats hosted substantial populations of American lotus, lily pads, and wild rice.

In 1898, officials with the United States Army Corps of Engineers and the District of Columbia convinced the United States Congress that the Anacostia River should be dredged to create a more commercially viable channel that would enhance the local economy as well as provide land where factories or warehouses might be built. The material dredged from the river would be used to build up the flats and turn them into dry land, eliminating the public health dangers they caused. Most of the reclaimed mudflats were subsequently declared to be parkland and named Anacostia Water Park (now Anacostia Park) in 1919.

The original dredging plan called for a channel 15 feet (4.6 m) wide on the Anacostia's west bank from the 11th Street Bridges to Massachusetts Avenue SE, narrowing to a 9 feet (2.7 m) wide channel from Massachusetts Avenue SE to the Maryland-District border line. In addition to this channel (which was meant to facilitate the passage of cargo ships) the McMillan Commission proposed building a dam across the Anacostia River at Massachusetts Avenue SE or at Benning Bridge to form a large lake for fishing and recreational boating. The commission also proposed using dredged material to build islands within the lake. The Washington Post reported in July 1914 that Congress had approved the plan for a dam on the river at Massachusetts Avenue SE. By 1916, the Corps of Engineers was still planning a dam, with access to the 9 feet (2.7 m) deep lake behind it controlled by locks. The Corps also planned to create several large islands in the lake and planned to replace Benning Bridge with a drawbridge to accommodate the cargo traffic through the lake. The firm of Sanford and Brooks began the dredging in January 1903, at which time the Army Corps of Engineers began surveying the surrounding land to determine whether the federal government or private landowners had title to the marshes themselves.

By 1920, the Corps of Engineers had dropped the dam idea and proposed creating a 6 feet (1.8 m) deep lake on one side of the Anacostia River by linking several of the mid-river islands it had built with dikes. That same year, Congress specifically prohibited the Corps from extending Anacostia Park beyond Benning Bridge, which forced the Corps to drop its plans for a drawbridge.

== Early development efforts ==
By March 1926, the Corps had begun calling the lake it had created Kingman Lake, after the well-regarded former head of the Corps, Brigadier General Dan Christie Kingman. The name was formally proposed in September. Improvements to the island and lake continued: The Corps spent $55,000 for a rock and concrete riprap wall around Kingman Lake, and another $20,000 for gates and conduits at the north and south ends of the lake to maintain a constant water level in lake. The Corps wanted to install a lock in the southern end of the lake to give pleasure boats access to it, and began laying plans for a second lake (East Lake) on the eastern side of the Anacostia River opposite Kingman Lake. That same year, the National Aeronautic Association proposed filling in all or part of Kingman Lake to build a new city airport. In early 1929, a channel 6 feet (1.8 m) deep was dredged under Benning Bridge as it passed over Kingman Lake. (As of 1998, due to the reconstruction of Benning Bridge and other changes, this had been replaced with a 30 feet (9.1 m) wide culvert.) The dredging ship Benning also dredged about half of Kingman Lake to deepen it. By this time, the conduit and gates had been installed in the lake's lower exit, and the upper gates were expected to be installed soon. About 200 acres (81 ha) of the western shore of Kingman Lake between Gallinger Hospital and Benning Bridge were set aside for gardens in March 1933 to provide food for the needy.

The drainage of raw sewage into Kingman Lake and the Anacostia River first became an issue in the early 1930s. An open sewer channel drained into Kingman Lake through the middle of this tract, but a footbridge was constructed over it to link the two areas. Later that year, the Army Corps of Engineers spent $853,000 to extend Washington's sewer system to Bladensburg to collect raw sewage being dumped into the Anacostia River and Kingman Lake.

In 1934, the Corps of Engineers transferred ownership of the Anacostia Flats and Kingman Lake to the National Park Service. As the Corps continued to dredge fill, it expanded the flats on the eastern side of Kingman Lake, making it smaller than originally intended. Work on the lake stopped in 1941 due to budgetary and resource shortages associated with the advent of World War II.

Health issues regarding Kingman Lake again became prominent in the mid-1950s. An American University biologist found that the bed of Kingman Lake was composed almost entirely of fecal matter, and warned that no one should swim in the lake due to the extensive pollution. The immense amount of raw sewage in the lake was attributed to low water flows, and the lack of southern locks to allow water to more freely pass out of the lake. Nonetheless, a year later city officials were advocating that a playground be built on the shores of Kingman Island.

A number of development proposals were made for Kingman Lake throughout the 1960s. The National Capital Parks Commission banned boating on the lake in October 1961. The commission also proposed filling in 59 acres (24 ha) of Kingman Lake (about 50 to 60 percent of the lake's total area) and relocating some of the riprap walls, making Islands 3 and 4 part of the mainland and adding 19 acres (7.7 ha) to Langston Golf Course (located on the northern half of Kingman Island). This plan was never acted on.

== Recent development ==
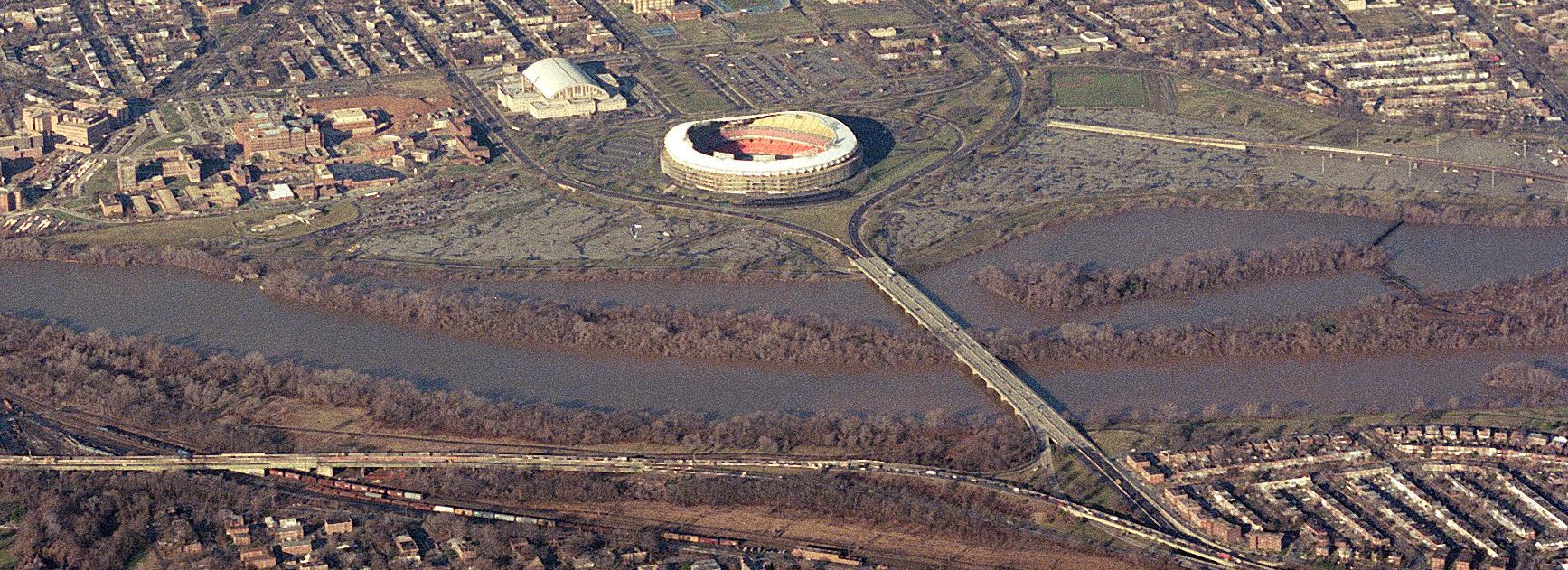
An aerial photograph looking west at the middle and lower portions of Kingman Lake in 1991. Heritage Island is in the middle of the lake, while Kingman Island (the much longer island) forms the barrier between Kingman Lake and the Anacostia River. RFK Stadium and Whitney Young Memorial Bridge can also been seen.

Since 1999, a variety of proposals have been made for Kingman Lake, most focusing on retaining the lake's character as one of the few remaining wild places within the city's limits. In September 1999, the Army Corps of Engineers—which retained ownership of Kingman Lake—began transforming the lake back into a tidal marsh. The Corps said it would remove some of the riprap wall and create 42 acres (17 ha) of marsh north of Benning Bridge and 7 acres (2.8 ha) of marsh between Benning Bridge and East Capitol Street Bridge. Work on the tidal marsh would be complete by March 2000, and during the summer of 2000 the Corps intended to plant tens of thousands of aquatic plants in the new marshlands. The cost of the wall removal, marsh restoration, and plantings was estimated at $4 million. A five-year scientific effort would monitor changes in the tidal marsh from 2001 to 2006.

== Deaths and accidents ==
Deaths and accidents in and around Kingman Lake have unfortunately been numerous. The first confirmed death in Kingman Lake occurred on August 5, 1937, when William O'Bryant, a 19-year-old African American youth, drowned in the lake in front of two friends after diving from a fishing boat. Over the next four decades, at least 31 people drowned in the lake.

Some of the more unusual accidents and deaths involving the lake include:

- In October 1941, police found the bones of Omara Wilson, 50, a squatter living on Kingman Island, who had been eaten by a wild dog.
- On January 22, 1943, a two-engine U.S. Army Air Corps transport plane piloted by Brigadier General Luther S. Smith crashed in Kingman Lake after its engines failed shortly after takeoff at Bolling Air Force Base. Neither Smith nor the four enlisted men traveling with him were injured.
- The body of a male transvestite, still wearing women's clothing, was found in Kingman Lake in July 1944. An investigation and autopsy revealed that the man committed suicide after leaping off Benning Bridge where it crossed the lake.
- Four teenage boys drowned in Kingman Lake in June 1951 after a high-speed police chase. The four had stolen several cakes from a local bakery and were attempting to flee from police in a stolen vehicle. The driver lost control of the automobile, which plunged from Benning Bridge into Kingman Lake.
- A seven-year-old boy, which the local media dubbed the "Cold Crusoe" (after the fictional shipwrecked character of Robinson Crusoe), was rescued from Island No. 3 in Kingman Lake in February 1956. The boy allegedly swam to the island using a log as a raft. With no sign of a boat, police believed the boy had drowned. After several days, the police finally located the child (who revealed how he got to the island).
- A 13-year-old boy in a stolen automobile plunged into Kingman Lake in 1959 while being chased by police. The boy later said he had no idea the lake was there.
