= Kingman and Heritage Islands =

Islands in the Anacostia River in Washington, D.C.

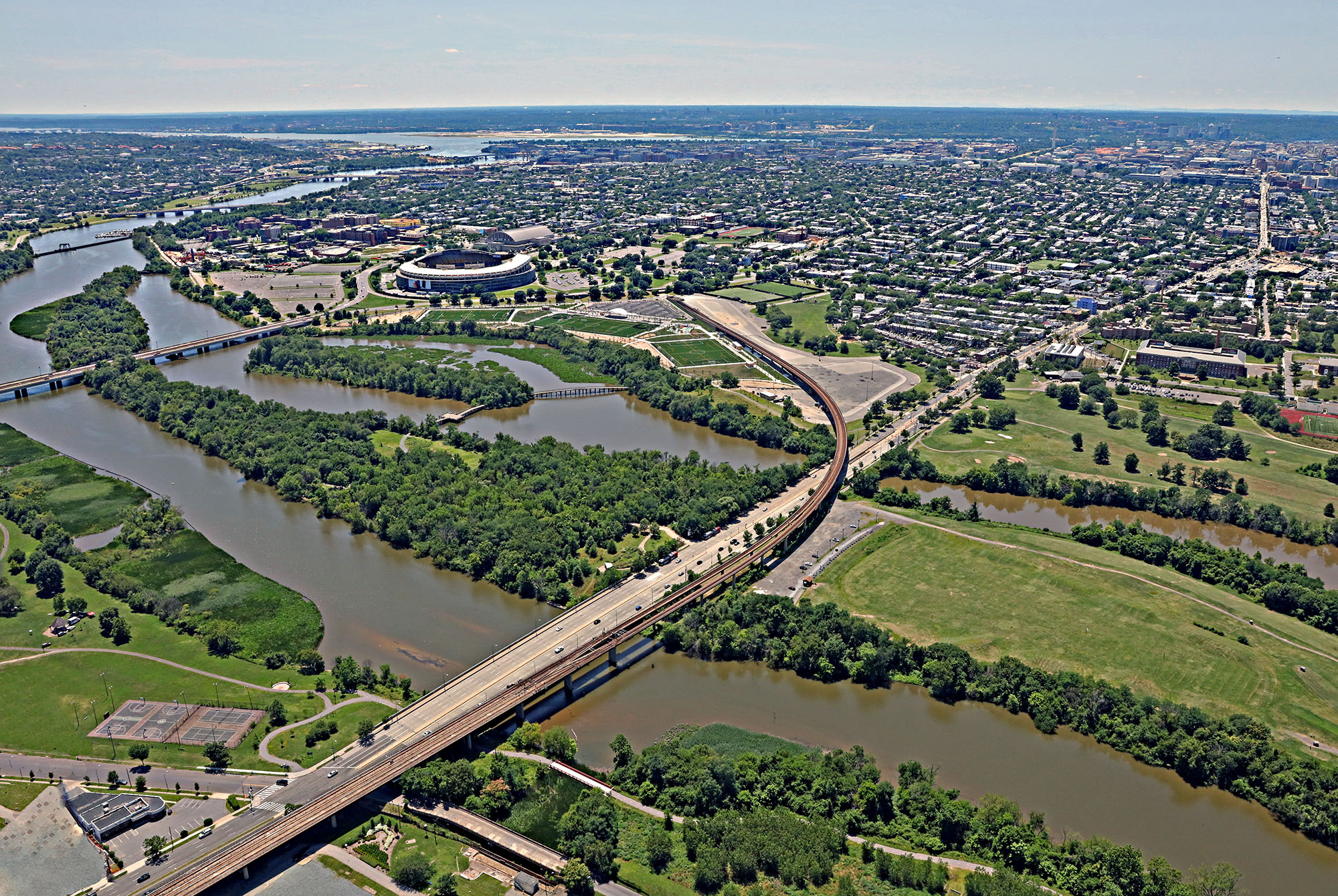
- Kingman and Heritage Islands in the Anacostia River

- Location within the District of Columbia

Geography
- Location: Washington, D.C., U.S.
- Coordinates: 38.8990000°N 76.9644193°W
- Total islands: 2
- Area: 40 acres (16 ha) (Kingman); 6 acres (2.4 ha) (Heritage)

Kingman and Heritage Islands are artificial islands located in the Anacostia River in Washington, D.C. Both islands were built from material dredged from the river and completed in 1916. Kingman Island is bordered on the east by the River and on the west by the 110-acre (45 ha) Kingman Lake. Heritage Island is surrounded by Kingman Lake. Both islands were federally owned property managed by the National Park Service until the D.C. government took control in 1995.

Kingman Island is bisected by Benning Road via the Ethel Kennedy Bridge at a place called the Burnham Barrier, with the southern half of the island bisected by East Capitol Street via the Whitney Young Memorial Bridge. Langston Golf Course occupied the northern half of Kingman Island, while Heritage Island and the southern half of Kingman Island constitute the protected Kingman and Heritage Island Park. The former RFK Stadium and future New Stadium at RFK Campus are located to the west. Kingman Island and Lake are named after Dan Christie Kingman, the former head of the United States Army Corps of Engineers.

== History ==
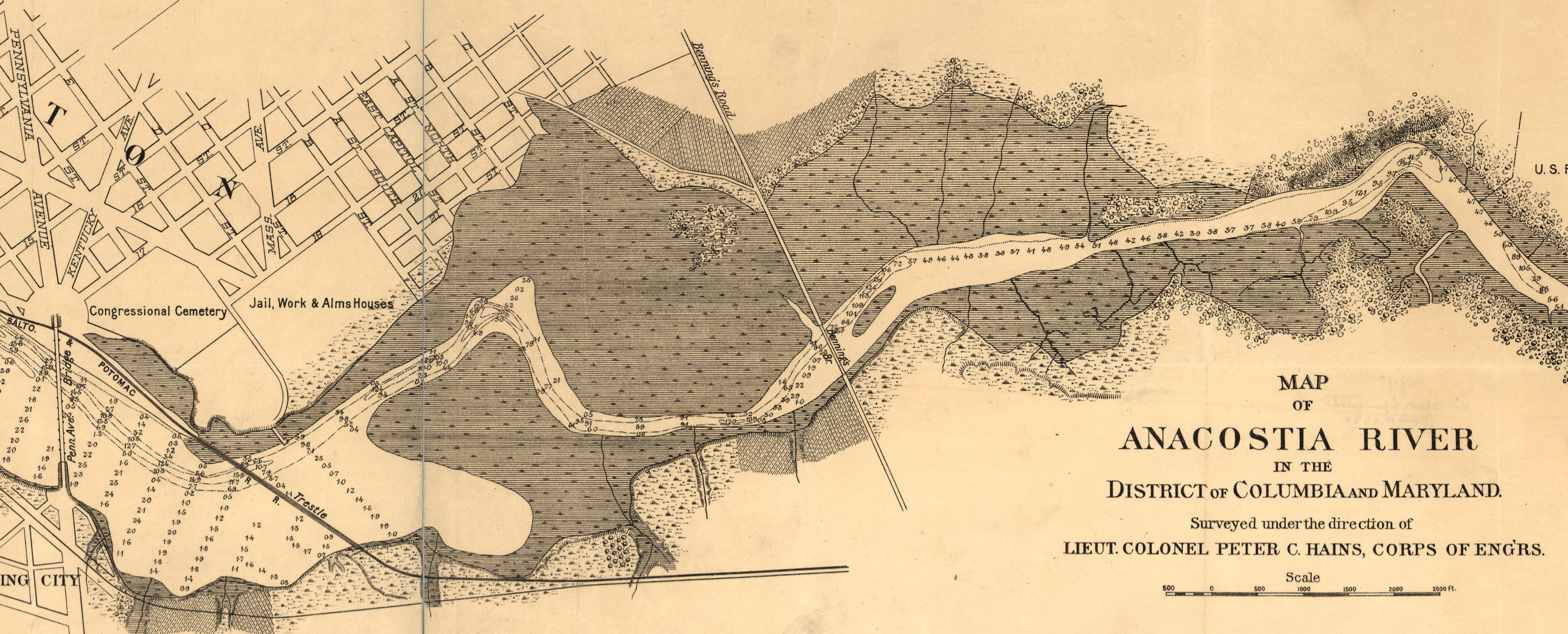
1891 Army Corps of Engineers map of the Anacostia River and its tidal marshes

Prior to the arrival of European settlers in the 18th century, the Anacostia River was a fast-flowing and relatively silt-free river with very few mudflats or marshes. White settlers cleared much of the surrounding forest for farmland, however, and extensive soil erosion led to a heavy load of silt and effluent in the Anacostia. In 1805, local landowner Benjamin Stoddert built a wooden bridge over the Anacostia River at the present site of Ethel Kennedy Bridge. The bridge was sold to Thomas Ewell, who in the 1820s sold it to William Benning. Thereafter the structure was known as Benning's Bridge (or Benning Bridge). The wooden bridge was rebuilt several times after 1805. This included construction of a steel bridge in 1892. The construction of Benning and other bridges and the diversion of inflowing streams to agricultural use also slowed the river's current, allowing much of the silt to settle and be deposited.

Between 1860 and the late 1880s, large mudflats ("the Anacostia flats") formed on both banks of the Anacostia River due to this deforestation and runoff. At this time, the city allowed its sewage to pour untreated into the Anacostia. Marsh grass began growing in the flats, trapping the sewage and leading public health experts to conclude that the flats were unsanitary. Health officials also feared that the flats were a prime breeding ground for malaria- and yellow fever-carrying mosquitoes. By 1876, a large mudflat had formed immediately south of Benning Bridge and another flat some 740 feet (230 m) wide had developed south of that. By 1883, a stream named "Succabel's Gut" traversed the upper flat and another dubbed "Turtle Gut" the lower, and almost all flats on the river hosted substantial populations of American lotus, lily pads, and wild rice.

=== Dredging ===
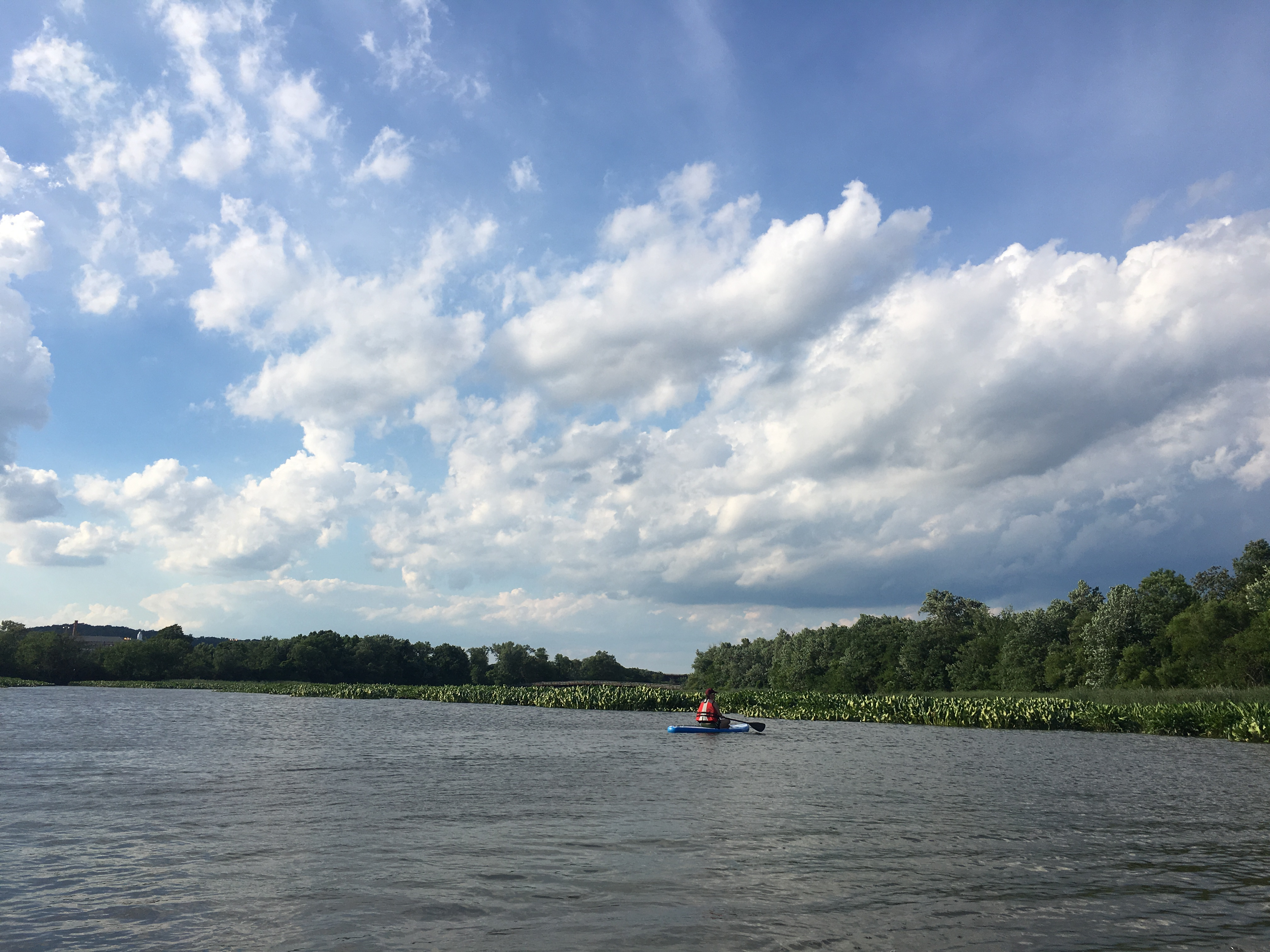
Kingman Island from the Anacostia River, 2017

In 1898, officials with the United States Army Corps of Engineers and the District of Columbia convinced the United States Congress that the Anacostia River should be dredged to create a more commercially viable channel that would enhance the local economy. The dredged material would be used to build up the marshes—drying them out and eliminating the public health dangers they caused, as well as creating land where factories or warehouses might be built. Although the height of the reclaimed land would vary from 14 feet (4.3 m) to 24 feet (7.3 m) (the amount of dredged material depended on how much money was appropriated), the Corps of Engineers hoped to reclaim mudflats from Pennsylvania Avenue SE north to at least Benning Bridge.

Decisions on how to use the newly created land occurred over the next few years. In 1900, the United States Senate established the McMillan Commission, a body to advise the Congress and District of Columbia on ways to improve the parks, monuments, memorials, and infrastructure of the city as well as plan for urban renewal, economic growth, and expansion of the federal government. The McMillan Commission concluded that commercial land was not needed and proposed turning the reclaimed flats into parkland. The D.C. government agreed in 1905, and the United States Commission of Fine Arts (a federal advisory agency with review authority over the design and aesthetics of projects within Washington, D.C.) and the Army Corps of Engineers concurred in 1914. Most of the reclaimed mudflats were subsequently declared to be parkland and named Anacostia Water Park (now Anacostia Park) in 1919. The National Capital Park and Planning Commission (NCPPC) signed on (belatedly) to the park plan in 1928.

The original dredging plan called for a channel 15 feet (4.6 m) wide on the Anacostia's west bank from the 11th Street Bridges to Massachusetts Avenue SE, narrowing to a 9-foot (2.7 m) wide channel from Massachusetts Avenue SE to the Maryland-District border line. In addition to this channel (which was meant to facilitate the passage of cargo ships), the McMillan Commission proposed building a dam across the Anacostia River at Massachusetts Avenue SE or at Benning Bridge to form a large lake for fishing and recreational boating. The commission also proposed using dredged material to build islands within the lake. The Washington Post reported in July 1914 that Congress had approved the plan for a dam on the river at Massachusetts Avenue SE. By 1916, the Corps of Engineers was still planning a dam, with access to the 9-foot (2.7 m) deep lake behind it controlled by locks. The Corps also planned to create several large islands in the lake and planned to replace Benning Bridge with a drawbridge to accommodate cargo ship traffic through the lake.

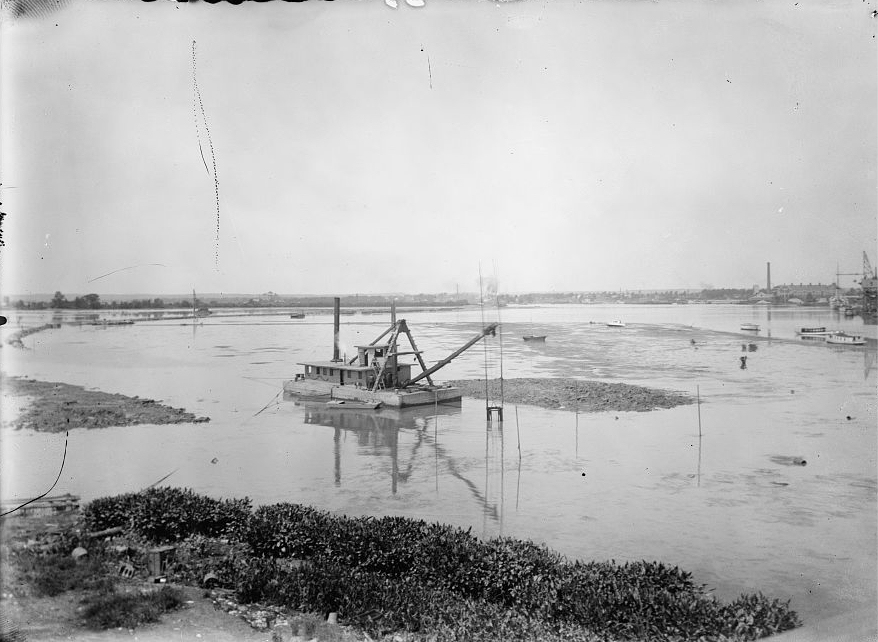
A ship dredging on the Anacostia River, 1912

The firm of Sanford and Brooks began the dredging in January 1903, at which time the Army Corps of Engineers began surveying the surrounding land to determine whether the federal government or private landowners had title to the marshes themselves. The survey work was complete by November 1905, with the U.S. government asserting ownership over the flats. In June 1912, Congress appropriated $100,000 to dredge the Anacostia from the 11th Street Bridges to the District-Maryland line. In June 1915, the dredges discovered two large anchors with many feet of chain attached to them. The anchors were believed to have come from United States Navy gunboat barges burned on the Anacostia River in 1814 during the War of 1812. Both Kingman Island and Heritage Island were completed in 1916.

=== 1920s–1940s ===
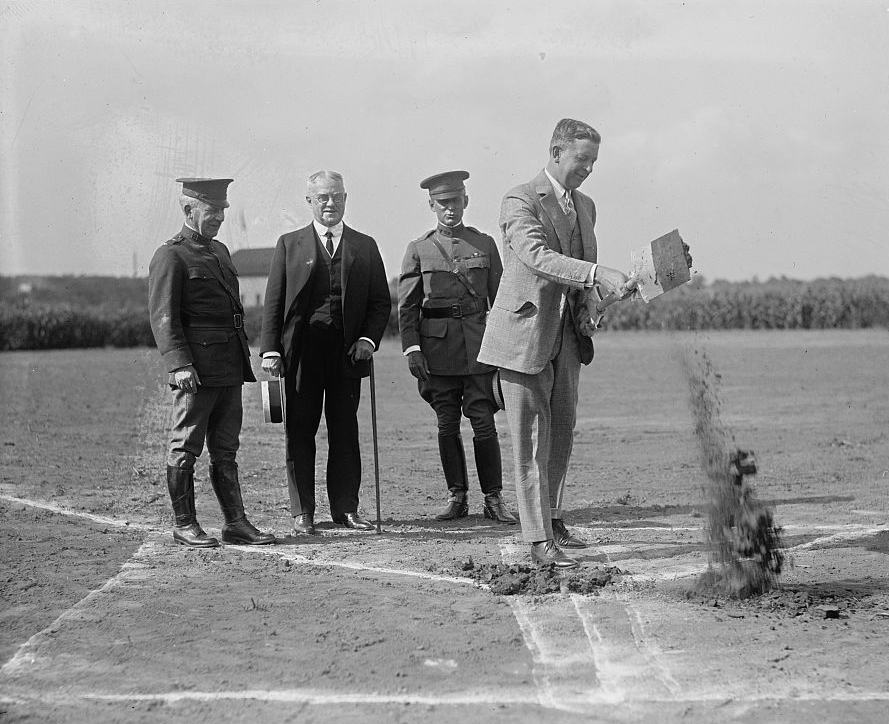
Dwight F. Davis and others groundbreaking for the dedication of Anacostia Park, August 1923

In 1926, the National Aeronautic Association proposed filling in all or part of Kingman Lake to expand Kingman Island so that an airport could be built there. Two years later, the piers supporting the Benning Bridge were reconfigured to permit a dredge to pass between them. The existing piers (which were 26.5 feet (8.1 m) apart) were replaced with piers 30.5 feet (9.3 m) apart. The reconfiguration was exceptionally complex, as 92 percent of the city's electrical supply passed through cables carried by Benning Bridge. The new, large dredging ship Benning was used to dredge the upper part of the Anacostia River, and some of the fill from this operation was used to create two new islands in Kingman Lake, named Island No. 3 (3 acres (1.2 ha) in size) and Island No. 4 (4 acres (1.6 ha) in size).

In 1934, Benning Bridge was rebuilt as a beam bridge on concrete piers. That same year, the Corps of Engineers transferred ownership of Anacostia Park, Kingman and Heritage islands, and Kingman Lake to the National Park Service. The Park Service also proposed extending East Capitol Street onto the reclaimed land and then over the Anacostia River, and building a complex of sports stadiums, an armory, an outdoor theater, a swimming pool, an ice skating rink, and athletic fields on the flats. Legislation proposing a bridge across Kingman Island and stadium complex in Anacostia Park was submitted to Congress, which did not act on the proposals. The first nine holes of Langston Golf Course were built on the north end of Kingman Island in 1939, and the back nine on the lake's western shore in 1955.

Work on the islands stopped in 1941 due to budgetary and resource shortages associated with the advent of World War II. In August 1947, construction of an airport on Kingman Island was again proposed, but the NCPPC disapproved the proposal in December. The project was proposed again in August 1948, because dredged material was still being placed on Kingman Island to build it up and large portions of the island remained undeveloped.

In 1946, the last pair of bald eagles on the Anacostia River abandoned their nest on Kingman Island. Although a bird watcher claimed to have seen a bald eagle nest on the Anacostia River in 1988, the bald eagle did not return until transplanted eaglets returned to the river as adults in 2004.

=== 1950s–1960s ===
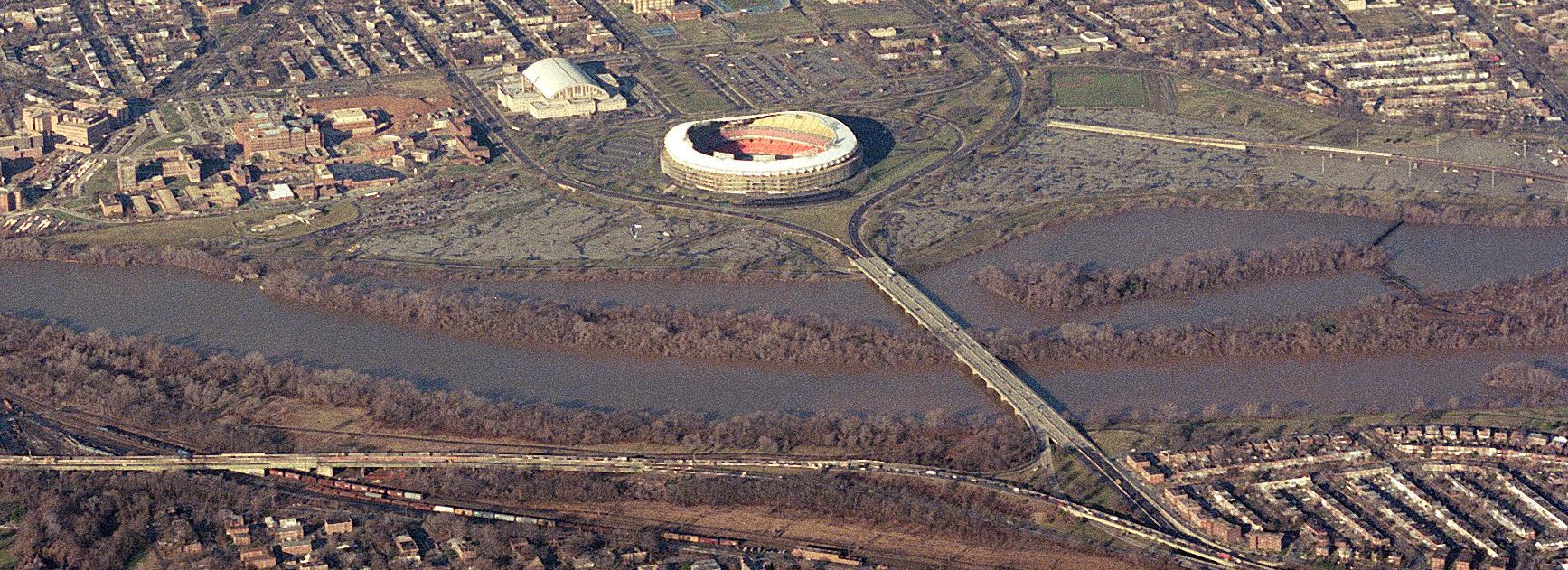
The Whitney Young Memorial Bridge was built across Kingman Island and the Anacostia River in 1955.

The city finally extended East Capitol Street across the Anacostia River and Kingman Island in 1955. That 1934 proposal was finally approved by city and federal planners in 1949. Construction required that 650,000 cubic yards (500,000 m^{3}) of lake bottom be dredged from Kingman Lake and replaced with sand and gravel to create a gently curving peninsula that extended 800 feet (240 m) into the western side of the lake. 1.3 million cubic yards (990,000 m^{3}) of fill would be used to raise the peninsula 35 feet (11 m) above the low water mark, so that the bridge's western approaches could be built on the new land. The Whitney Young Memorial Bridge opened in November 1955.

Reclaimed land on the western shore of Kingman Lake became the site of RFK Stadium in 1957. D.C. officials, who had been seeking a site for a large all-purpose sports stadium since the early 1930s, finally won support from the U.S. House of Representatives for a stadium at Anacostia Park in January 1957. D.C. Commissioners approved the site a few days after the House vote, and the District of Columbia Stadium (renamed Robert F. Kennedy Stadium in 1968) opened in 1961.

A number of development proposals were made for Kingman Island throughout the 1960s, although few were adopted. A second concrete span for Benning Bridge was constructed in 1961; the old span now carried eastbound traffic, while the new span carried only westbound traffic. In 1961, the NCPPC proposed filling in 59 acres (24 ha) of Kingman Lake (about 50 to 60 percent of the lake's total area) and relocating some of the riprap walls to make Islands 3 and 4 part of the mainland and add an additional 19 acres (7.7 ha) to Langston Golf Course. This plan was never acted on, and a year later the city proposed turning Kingman Island into a landfill. Two years later, the city proposed closing the first nine holes of Langston Golf Course and building a $10 million public aquarium on the site, but the National Park Service refused to turn over the land to the city. In 1965, the city again asked permission to turn Kingman Island into a landfill. Although this plan was not approved, the city did begin dumping environmental trash (such as grass cuttings, leaves, and tree stumps) on Kingman Island at this time. Four years later, the city proposed closing all of Langston Golf Course and building extensive low-income public housing on the golf course and the rest of Kingman Island.

== Land transfer ==
In 1915, ownership of the newly created land became an issue in a lawsuit. The boundary of the District of Columbia had been set by the Black-Jenkins Award, a decision by an arbitration panel in 1874 which resolved centuries of dispute by placing Virginia's boundary with Maryland at the low-water mark on the Virginia side of the Potomac River. The Virginia retrocession of 1846-1847 returned a portion of the District of Columbia on the Virginia site of the Potomac River to the state of Virginia. This left in doubt the exact position of the District's border with Virginia. In Morris v. United States, 174 U.S. 196 (1899), the Supreme Court of the United States held that land built in the Potomac River not only belonged to the District of Columbia but to the federal government (contrary to the claims of private landowners, who believed the property belonged to them). In Maryland v. West Virginia, 217 U. S. 1 (1910), the U.S. Supreme Court again affirmed that Maryland's southern border extended to the low-water mark on the far side of the Potomac River. The issue arose again in 1915, when the Washington Steel & Ordnance Company claimed it owned the newly created land in the Anacostia River created by the dredging operation. The District of Columbia Supreme Court held on December 29, 1915, that the federal government held title to the land. But this decision was overturned on technical grounds by the Court of Appeals for the District of Columbia in Washington Steel & Ordnance Company v. Martin, 45 App. 600 (1917). Nonetheless, in dicta in Washington Steel & Ordnance Company, the court of appeals made note of the Supreme Court's ruling in Morris v. United States and held that the reclaimed land belonged to the federal government. The issue as to who owned the dredged land and islands seemed settled.

By 1920, the Corps of Engineers had dropped the dam idea and instead proposed creating a 6-foot (1.8 m) deep lake on one side of the Anacostia River by linking several of the mid-river islands it had built with dikes. That same year, Congress specifically prohibited the Corps from extending Anacostia Park beyond Benning Bridge, which forced the Corps to drop its plans for a drawbridge. In late 1922, dredging temporarily ceased after funding for continued dredging ran out.

The land transfer became the subject of a legal battle, which eventually led to congressional action. In August 1993, the Sierra Club Legal Defense Fund filed suit to block it, claiming that the federal government was required to conduct an environmental impact assessment before handing over the land. The group's interest in Kingman and Heritage islands was environmental: The lack of development and the wilderness-like aspect of the two islands had made them important to wildlife in the area. According to an Audubon Society survey at the time, more than 60 species of birds—including blue herons, eagles, snowy egrets, and ospreys—now lived on the islands. In December 1994, a United States district court agreed, and said the Park Service had violated the National Environmental Policy Act (NEPA) by transferring the land without conducting the assessment. D.C. officials sought the assistance of Congress. In July 1996, after a two-year lobbying effort, Congress passed the "National Children's Island Act of 1996" (P.L. 104–163, 110 Stat. 1416), which bypassed NEPA and transferred the land to the District of Columbia. The legislation specified, however, that the city could use the land only for a children's park. Congress acted after National Children's Island, Inc., unveiled plans for a scaled-back, $150 million development which was characterized as a "mini-Epcot Center". The company said it would begin construction within 14 months of the passage of the legislation.

The project again caused significant controversy, but was eventually terminated. In early October 1997, D.C. Mayor Marion Barry proposed legislation giving National Children's Island, Inc., a 99-year lease on Kingman and Heritage islands. Although it initially appeared that the legislation would pass quickly, opposition from the Sierra Club Legal Defense Fund led several Council members to withdraw their support for the lease. Opponents pointed out, too, that the company had performed none of the studies required by the 1993 Council vote. The delay doomed the project. In 1995, Congress had imposed a Financial Control Board on the D.C. government in an attempt to help the city avoid impending bankruptcy. The Control Board had the power to override decisions made by the mayor and city council. On March 5, 1999, the Financial Control Board exercised that power and voided the city's agreements to build Children's Island. The Control Board said the project would cost too much and was not financially viable. The decision was the first time the panel overturned a decision by city officials.

On September 15, 1998, the wooden footbridge from the western shore to Kingman Island was set afire by vandals around 9:00 p.m., and burned for about two and a half hours. Despite the efforts of 50 firefighters and a fire boat, most of the structure burned and collapsed into Kingman Lake.

== Development proposals ==
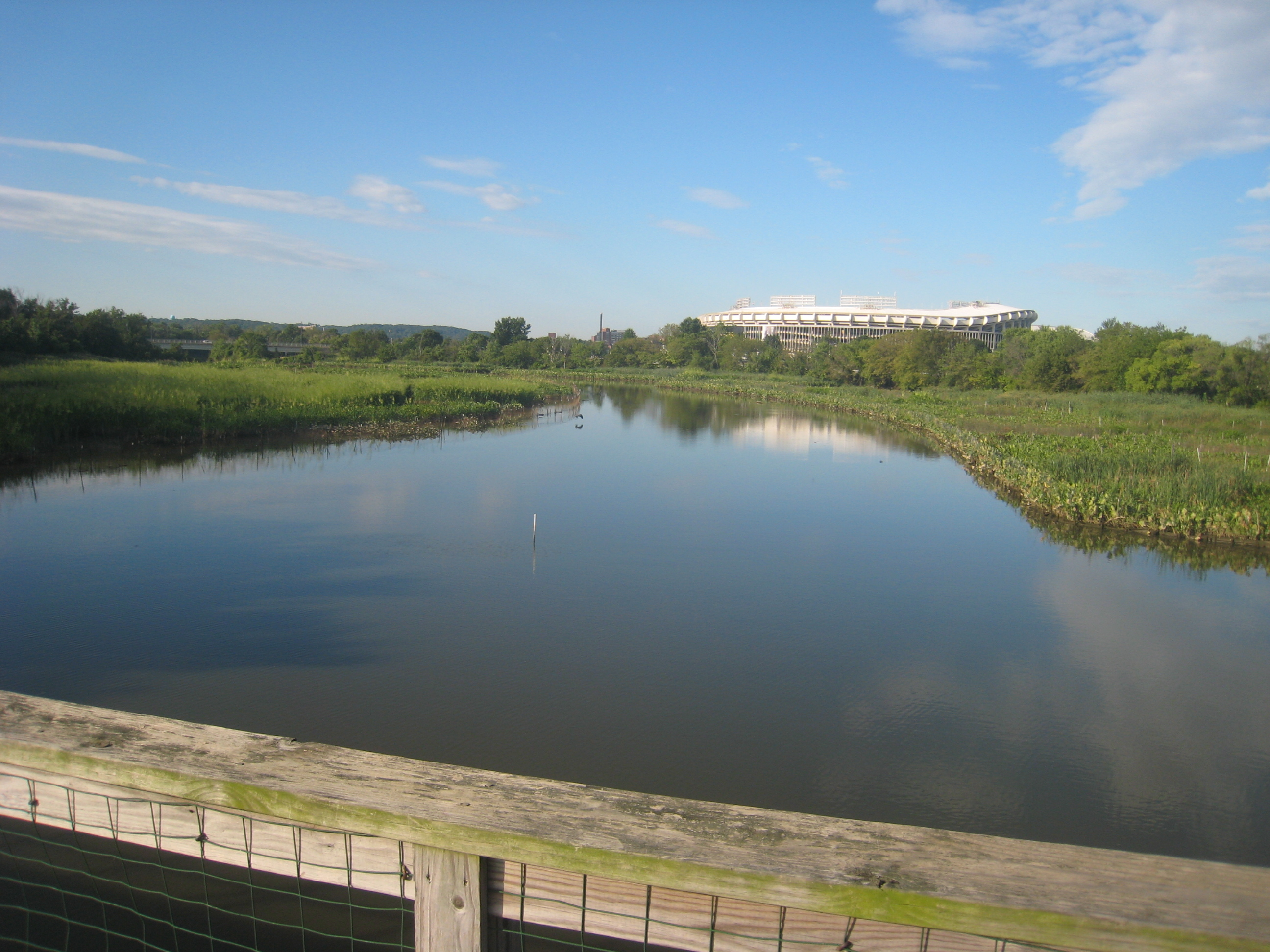
Looking south at Kingman Lake and RFK Stadium (background) from the footbridge connecting Kingman Island (left) to the western shore (right).

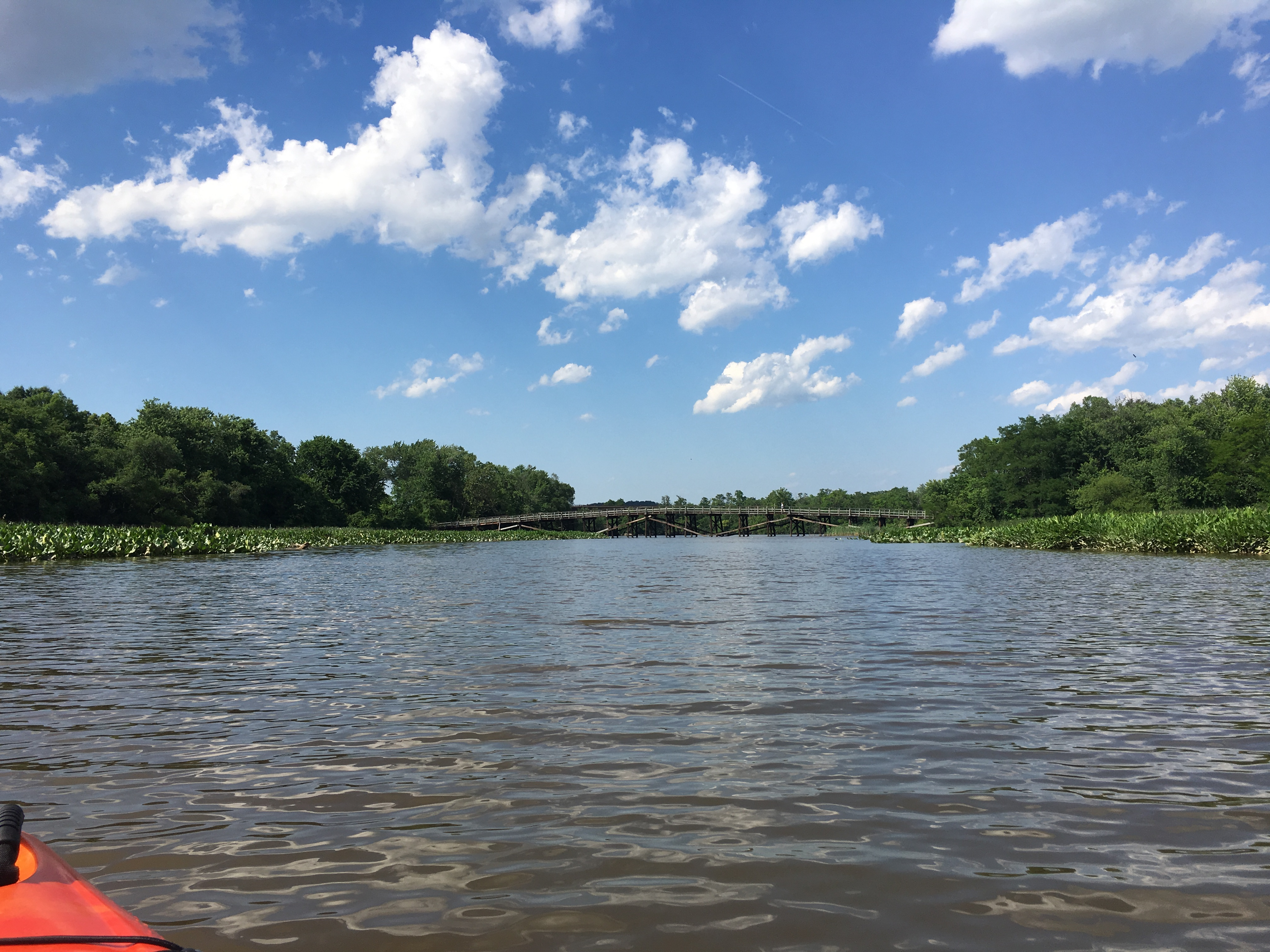
The Kingman Island footbridge taken from the Anacostia River, looking north (June 2017).

Turning Kingman and Heritage Islands into a children's theme park was a major development proposal which was under consideration for two decades before being abandoned. The idea was first proposed in 1967. The concept was revived in 1972 as part of the United States Bicentennial celebrations, and included a $3 million playground and arts facility for children (including special areas for the handicapped). The American Revolution Bicentennial Commission gave the backers of the plan a $30,000 planning grant to help get the park off the ground. City officials began informally calling the Kingman Island "National Children's Island" in order to support the park's developers. The city also leased the southern part of Kingman Island from the United States Department of the Interior to spur the development. A small administration building and a children's playhouse were built, 100 cherry trees planted, and Islands No. 3 and 4 connected to the mainland by wooden footbridges. Some land was cleared, and a few brick footpaths laid down. Plans for the park soon included several playgrounds, undeveloped areas where children could learn about nature, a stage, and a worm farm. The Army Corps of Engineers itself erected a wooden footbridge connecting the shore to Heritage Island and Heritage Island to Kingman Island. The size of the theme park was also expanded to include Heritage Island. But four years and $4 million of public and private funds later, the proposal was abandoned. City officials said in 1980 that deteriorating budget conditions (caused by the beginning of the early 1980s recession) had led to "the worst budget crisis in the city's history", and officials could no longer justify spending another $4 million to complete the park. But 15 years later, press reports laid the failure of the project to a decision by Congress and the United States Department of Housing and Urban Development to withhold funds for the project.

District officials built a fence around the shores of Kingman and Heritage Island in the early 1980s to protect them from illegal dumping and vandalism, but the fences did not work. Businesses and members of the public dumped discarded construction materials and other waste on the islands, and homeless people often tried to live there.

In 1986, D.C. officials considered building a new District of Columbia Jail on Kingman Island, but the National Park Service still controlled the island and refused to consider the idea. Two years later, the District of Columbia was looking for a way to upgrade RFK Stadium so that the Washington Redskins would continue to play their games inside the city limits. D.C. Mayor Sharon Pratt Dixon proposed allowing the Redskins to build a new stadium on the parking lots adjacent to RFK Stadium and replacing the lost parking lots with new ones built on Kingman Island—a proposal that included tearing up Langston Golf Course and turning it, too, into parking lots. In 1991, as the District still struggled to craft a deal to build a new stadium, Secretary of the Interior Manuel Lujan Jr. forced Mayor Dixon to agree to preserve Langston Golf Course (although Lujan did agree to allow a redesign of the facility to accommodate some stadium parking).

A renewed effort to build a children's theme park emerged during this period as well. In 1983, a new company, National Children's Island, Inc., was formed to act as the new developer. In 1991, the company proposed yet another large children-oriented theme park for Kingman and Heritage islands. Mayor Dixon supported the idea, but Interior Secretary Lujan forced her to drop the idea because Interior officials felt the proposed development was too densely built-up and would destroy the character of the region. The company drew up new proposals in August 1991 that provided for fewer attractions. Its new designs provided for a "family-oriented" park with walking trails and meadows (with only about 5 acres (2.0 ha) used for buildings and exhibits). Access to Kingman Island would be restricted to those who paid the $8 to $10 admission fee.

Attempts to build Children's Island quickly became entangled with the stadium deal. On September 10, 1991, the Dixon administration agreed to let the Redskins organization build parking lots on Kingman and Heritage islands. By March 1992, this agreement had been scaled back, so that the Redskins were permitted to build on only a portion of Kingman Island, while additional parking would be built on Langston Golf Course (which would be redesigned to accommodate the lots). The parking deal helped clinch the stadium agreement: On December 7, 1992, Redskins owner Jack Kent Cooke agreed to build his team's new stadium in the District of Columbia. Seven days later, Interior Secretary Lujan agreed to transfer 50 acres (20 ha) of Kingman Island to the District of Columbia for construction of the children's theme park. By now, National Children's Island, Inc., was advocating a $120 million park which would include science, nature, and geography pavilions; an entertainment building; a plaza that would host fairs, marketplace booths, and outdoor performances; a science center; and formal gardens—while still preserving much of the two islands as a nature preserve. Under terms of the agreement transferring the land to the city, no more than 5 acres (2.0 ha) could be utilized for buildings, and no structure could be taller than 50 feet (15 m).

The National Capital Planning Commission quickly approved of the transfer. However, various other groups were opposed to the theme park development, including several Advisory Neighborhood Commissions, the Anacostia Watershed Society, the Capitol Hill Restoration Society, and the Committee of 100 on the Federal City (a highly influential businesspersons' and civic leaders' organization). The D.C. City Council nonetheless approved the land transfer on July 13, 1993, although it also required that any plans for the islands be submitted to the council for approval. The council also required the company to complete an environmental impact assessment and more than a dozen other studies and present them to the council before any development could proceed. Meanwhile, the loss of parking space to the children's theme park and rising Congressional opposition to the stadium deal (primarily due to the impact it would have on local residents and its high costs) imperiled the D.C. stadium deal. Congressional opposition rose significantly after the stadium's chief proponent, D.C. City Council Chairman John A. Wilson, committed suicide on May 19, 1993. By December, Redskins owner Jack Kent Cooke had pledged to build his stadium in Maryland.

Since 1999, a variety of proposals have been made for Kingman and Heritage islands, most focusing on retaining the islands' character as one of the few remaining wild places within the city's limits. In December 2000, D.C. Mayor Anthony A. Williams signed an agreement with the Department of the Interior allowing the District government to retain ownership of Kingman and Heritage islands, even though the children's theme park had not been built. Under the agreement, the District of Columbia agreed to make improvements to the islands, provide police patrols on both islands, and conduct studies on how to best utilize the area. The city budgeted $500,000 for the capital improvement effort, which included rebuilding the wooden footbridge to the shore. The federal government and the city both agreed to spend $12 million on the study efforts. One of the improvements made was the planting and dedication, in September 2002, of a grove of trees on Kingman Island as a memorial to the lives lost in the September 11, 2001, terrorist attacks on New York City and The Pentagon. The United States Forest Service pledged $160,000 to the memorial grove, and environmental groups were working to raise additional money for more plantings and for maintenance. Over the next several years, the city said, it anticipated planting more than 2,000 trees in the grove, adding a memorial marker, and creating a nearby meadow for children to play in. In 2003, the Corps of Engineers said it would assist the city by replacing non-native trees and plants on the islands, and constructing meadows, footpaths, canoe tie-ups, and a playground on Kingman Island at a cost of $3 million.

More recent efforts have focused on turning Kingman and Heritage islands into nature centers. The islands were closed to the public in 2004 as improvements were made and trash removed. In 2005, Mayor Williams proposed turning the two islands into a formal wildlife refuge and building a $9 million environmental education center on Kingman Island. Williams proposed building the center as part of the Anacostia Waterfront Initiative, a multibillion-dollar plan to restore the river and economically develop the neighborhoods around it. Studios Architecture was chosen from among 10 firms to design the green building, which would extend out over the river, include a rooftop plant nursery, and use solar energy for heat. Local and national environmental groups also pledged their assistance. Williams proposed turning the two islands over to the Anacostia Waterfront Corporation, which was managing the Initiative at the time, and in May 2007 legislation to turn the islands over to the corporation's successor was introduced in the City Council. The legislation passed and was signed into law. Just four months later, the Office of the Deputy Mayor for Planning and Economic Development announced that proceeds from a $111.5 million PILOT bond would be used to improve Kingman Island and three other city parks. As of mid-2009, extensive improvements had been made. The two islands had about 1.5 miles (2.4 km) of trails, and the wooden footbridge connecting Kingman Island to the shore had been rebuilt. A square pier was built in the center of the footbridge connecting Heritage and Kingman islands, providing a place for bird watching, fishing, and for pedestrians to rest and view the marshes. The islands were home to more than 100 species of birds as well as mimosa trees, purple loosestrife, Queen Anne's lace, and turtles. The D.C. government turned over maintenance of the islands in 2009 to the nonprofit group Living Classrooms, and the city continued to plan for an environmental center and more trails.

== Accidents ==
A few unusual accidents have occurred on Kingman Island. In October 1941, the body of a homeless African American man was found on the island. Police concluded that the man had been attacked and killed by a wild dog, and the body almost completely devoured. Attempts to capture the animal proved fruitless. A seven-year-old boy, which the local media dubbed the "Cold Crusoe" (after the fictional shipwrecked character of Robinson Crusoe), was rescued from Island No. 3 in February 1956. The boy allegedly swam to the island using a log as a raft. With no sign of a boat, police believed the boy had drowned. After several days, the police finally located the child (who revealed how he got to the island). And in 1959, a 13-year-old boy in a stolen automobile plunged into Kingman Lake while being chased by police. The boy later said he had no idea the lake was there.
