= List of crossings of the Anacostia River =

This is a list of crossings of the Anacostia River and its two branches, the Northeast Branch Anacostia River and Northwest Branch Anacostia River. With the exception of the downstreammost crossings in Washington, D.C., all locations are in Maryland.

== Main stem ==
Image	Crossing	Carries	Location	Opened	Coordinates	Notes
	Frederick Douglass Memorial Bridge	South Capitol Street	Washington, D.C.	1950	38.8688°N 77.0052°W	Replacement bridge under construction as of 2021
	11th Street Bridges	I-695 (Southeast Freeway) / 11th Street SE	Washington, D.C.	2013	38.8719°N 76.9895°W	
	John Philip Sousa Bridge	Pennsylvania Avenue SE	Washington, D.C.	1939	38.8769°N 76.9779°W	
	Anacostia Railroad Bridge	CSX Transportation Landover Subdivision	Washington, D.C.	1872	38.880076°N 76.971889°W	
	Whitney Young Memorial Bridge	East Capitol Street	Washington, D.C.	1955	38.889764°N 76.964979°W	
	Ethel Kennedy Bridge	Benning Road	Washington, D.C.	2004	38.897195°N 76.963649°W	
	Washington Metro Orange, Blue, and Silver Lines		Washington, D.C.			
	Amtrak Railroad Anacostia Bridge	Amtrak Northeast Corridor	Washington, D.C.	1905	38.9170°N 76.9436°W	
	New York Avenue Bridge	US 50 (New York Avenue NE)	Washington, D.C.	1954	38.918067°N 76.942534°W	
	Bladensburg Park Pedestrian Bridge	Anacostia Riverwalk Trail	Colmar Manor–Bladensburg		38.936613°N 76.940941°W	
	Bladensburg Road Bridge	US 1 Alt. (Bladensburg Road)	Cottage City/Colmar Manor–Bladensburg		38.938741°N 76.942974°W	

== Northeast Branch ==
Image	Crossing	Location	Opened	Coordinates	Notes
	Baltimore Avenue	Hyattsville–Bladensburg			
	CSX Transportation Alexandria Extension	Edmonston			
	Decatur Street	Edmonston			
	Riverdale Road	Riverdale Park			
	MD 410 (East–West Highway)	Riverdale Park		38.9615°N 76.9250°W	
	Purple Line	Riverdale Park			Under construction
	River Road	Riverdale Park			
	Campus Drive	College Park–Riverdale Park			
Splits into Paint Branch and Indian Creek

== Northwest Branch ==
Image	Crossing	Location	Opened	Coordinates	Notes
	Anacostia Riverwalk Trail	Cottage City–Hyattsville			
	CSX Transportation Capital Subdivision	Cottage City/North Brentwood–Hyattsville			
	US 1 (Rhode Island Avenue)	North Brentwood–Hyattsville		38.9453°N 76.9469°W	
	38th Street	Brentwood–Hyattsville			
	Northwest Branch Trail	Brentwood–Hyattsville			
	Northwest Branch Trail	Mount Rainier–Hyattsville			
	MD 500 (Queens Chapel Road)	Mount Rainier–Hyattsville		38.9525°N 76.9664°W	
	footbridge to Chillum Road	Avondale–Hyattsville			Damaged
	Washington Metro Green and Yellow Lines	Avondale–Hyattsville			
	footbridge to Cypress Creek Drive	Chillum–Hyattsville			
	Sligo Creek Trail	Green Meadows–Hyattsville			
	Ager Road	Green Meadows–Hyattsville			
	Northwest Branch Trail	Green Meadows–Hyattsville			
	MD 410 (East–West Highway)	Green Meadows/Lewisdale–Hyattsville		38.9678°N 76.9687°W	
	Lane Manor Park footbridge	Lewisdale–Hyattsville			
	Lane Manor Park footbridge	Lewisdale–Hyattsville			
	Lane Manor Park footbridge	Lewisdale–Hyattsville			
	MD 193 (University Boulevard); Purple Line	Lewisdale–Hyattsville / Adelphi		38.9848°N 76.9642°W	
	Northwest Branch Trail	Adelphi			
	MD 212 (Riggs Road)	Adelphi		38.9923°N 76.9720°W	
	footbridge to Quebec Street	Langley Park–Adelphi			
	MD 650 (New Hampshire Avenue)	Langley Park–Silver Spring		39.0010°N 76.9823°W	
	MD 320 (Piney Branch Road)	Langley Park–Silver Spring		39.0016°N 76.9831°W	
	I-495 (Capital Beltway)	Silver Spring		39.0176°N 76.9942°W	
	US 29 (Colesville Road / Columbia Pike) Northwest Branch Trail	Silver Spring–White Oak		39.0300°N 77.0061°W	
	Burnt Mills Dam	Silver Spring–White Oak			
	Rachel Carson Greenway	Kemp Mill–Colesville			
	Randolph Road	Glenmont–Colesville			
	Poplar Run Trail	Glenmont–Colesville			
	Intercounty Connector	Glenmont–Colesville			
	Intercounty Connector	Glenmont–Colesville		39.0933°N 77.0292°W	
	Northwest Branch Trail	Glenmont–Colesville			
	Bonifant Road	Aspen Hill–Colesville			
	Intercounty Connector	Aspen Hill–Colesville			
	Northwest Golf Course footbridge	Colesville			
	Northwest Golf Course footbridge	Colesville			
	Northwest Golf Course footbridge	Colesville			
	Northwest Golf Course footbridge	Colesville			
	Northwest Golf Course footbridge	Colesville			
	Norbeck Road / Norwood Road	Colesville			river crosses under intersection
	Ednor Road	Sandy Spring			
	footbridge to Alexander Manor Drive	Sandy Spring			
	Underground Railroad Experience Trail	Sandy Spring			
	Norwood Road	Sandy Spring			
