= Amtrak Railroad Anacostia Bridge =

Railway-only bridge across the Anacostia River in Washington, D.C.

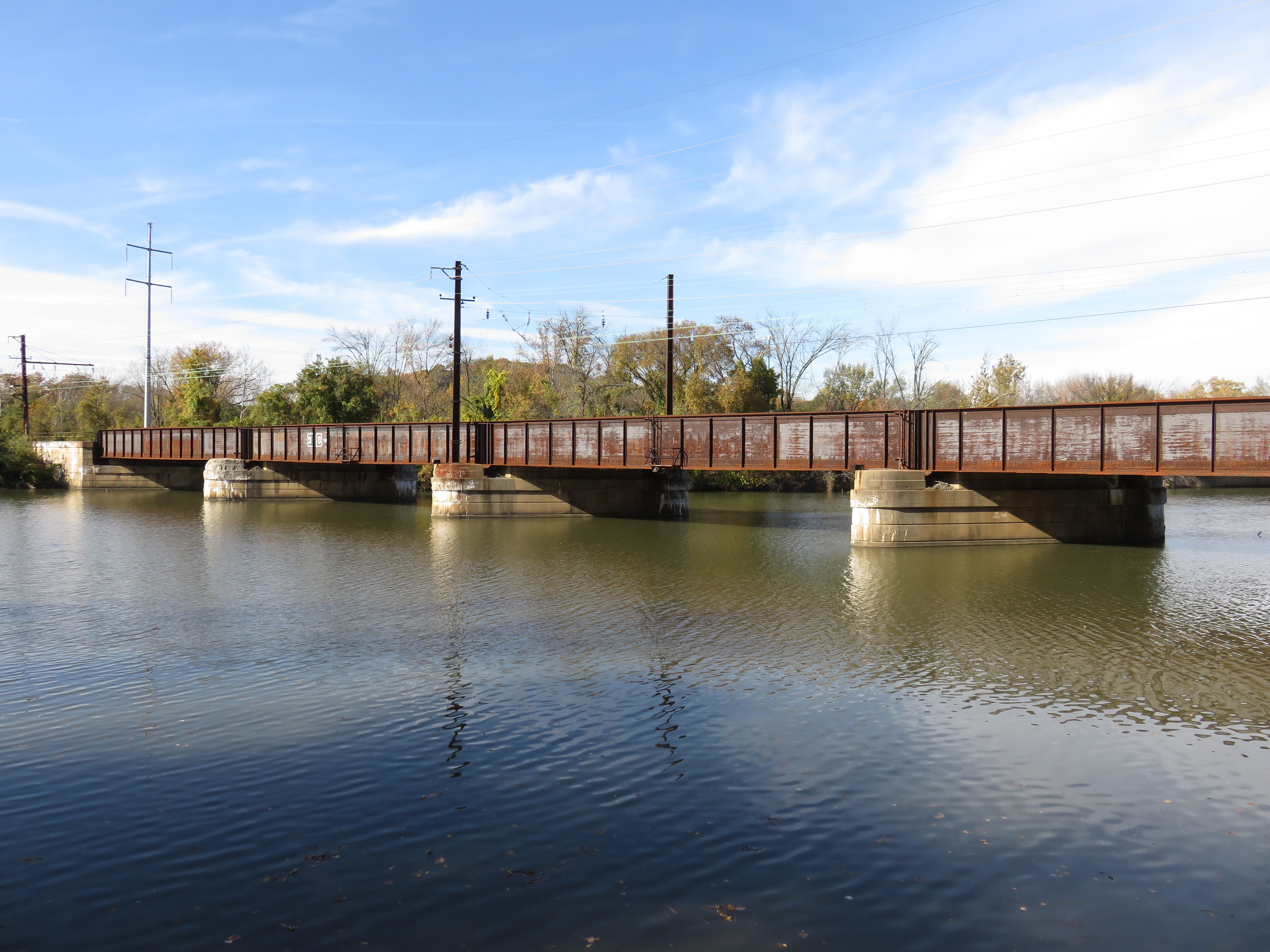
- The Amtrak Railroad Anacostia Bridge in 2016
- Coordinates: 38.9170°N 76.9436°W
- Carries: Amtrak, MARC
- Crosses: Anacostia River
- Locale: Washington, D.C., U.S.
- Maintained by: Amtrak

Characteristics
- Design: Plate girder bridge
- Total length: 360 feet (110 m)

Rail characteristics
- No. of tracks: 2
- Track gauge: 4 ft 8 1/2 in (1,435 mm) standard gauge
- Structure gauge: Clear overhead
- Electrified: 12 kV 25 Hz Amtrak power system

History
- Opened: 1905

Location
- Interactive map of Amtrak Railroad Anacostia Bridge

The Amtrak Railroad Anacostia Bridge is a railway bridge that crosses the Anacostia River in Washington, D.C. It carries Amtrak's Northeast Corridor and MARC's Penn Line passenger rail traffic. The bridge was damaged by the 1933 Chesapeake–Potomac hurricane, causing the famous "Crescent Limited wreck".

== Construction ==
On February 26, 1903, the Commissioners of the District of Columbia gave their approval for the Baltimore and Potomac Railroad (B&P, then controlled by the Pennsylvania Railroad, or PRR) to build a more direct line from Baltimore to the District of Columbia. The new route would be called the Magruder Branch (because it crossed the Magruder Branch, a stream which is a tributary of the Anacostia River). It would largely replace the local section of the Washington City Branch, which crossed the Anacostia 3 miles (4.8 km) to the south. The Magruder Branch would connect the new Union Station with the PRR's Magruder Station in Landover, Maryland (a major hub for the railroad).

The commissioners also approved the necessary bridge across the Anacostia (then also known as the "Eastern Branch"). The United States Army Corps of Engineers, which at the time had control over rivers and bridges in the District of Columbia, approved the new bridge in September 1903. Construction began in 1904. A 5-foot (1.52 m) deep bed of gravel was laid down, and concrete piers were placed on top of it. The bridge was nearly finished by the end of January 1905, with the foundation and entire substructure complete. As of April 1906, one of the two tracks across the bridge had been laid.

== Wreck of the Crescent Limited ==
The bridge was the site of the famous "Crescent Limited wreck." On August 23, 1933, a hurricane (known today as the Chesapeake–Potomac Hurricane of 1933) passed over the District of Columbia, bringing 7 inches (177.8 mm) of rain, extensive flooding, and much damage. Early in the morning on August 24, the Crescent Limited—a high-fare, luxury train catering to wealthy individuals—derailed as it crossed the bridge, plunging the locomotive and some passenger cars into the Anacostia River. Although traveling only 30 miles per hour (50 km/h), the locomotive was hurled nearly 125 feet (40 m) from the point where it left the rails.

The Anacostia's floodwaters had undermined the bridge's central piers, causing the bridge to sag and the rails to separate. The bridge's destruction had been swift: A track foreman had inspected the bridge 90 minutes before the wreck and found it sound, and a track walker had crossed the bridge just 10 minutes earlier and saw no damage.

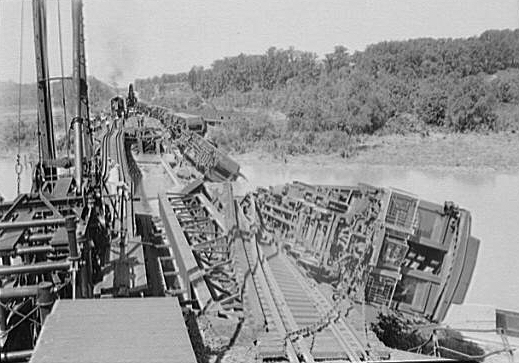
Wreck of the Crescent Limited train on the Pennsylvania Railroad's Anacostia River bridge.

There was amazingly little loss of life. The engineer and fireman were killed, and 13 passengers were injured (but only two severely). Just 30 passengers were aboard, which limited casualties. The couplings between the cars also held, preventing more cars from crashing into the river. Other factors also helped. When the train left Baltimore, railroad officials warned the engineer to slow down because of conditions created by the hurricane, and the locomotive's steam had been cut off (with the object of allowing the train to coast down the grade into the city). The cost of the disaster was estimated at between $80,000 and $240,000 ($1,900,000 to $5,800,000 in 2024 dollars). More than 300 workers began clearing the wreck the next day.

Several people were injured while clearing the wreck and rebuilding the bridge. A dredge, several cranes, and a pile driver were brought to shore up the bridge and help remove debris and wreckage. Two men were hurt on August 24 by debris and cranes attempting to lift the locomotive from the water. Two days later, a man was killed when a telephone pole on the bridge toppled onto him. The same day, the pile-driver fell into the river. Another worker was injured on August 27 after being hit by a boom. At least one wrongful-death lawsuit was filed. A temporary single-track span was erected on August 28, and traffic over the bridge resumed shortly thereafter.

An inquest into the wreck was scheduled for August 30. The inquest determined that flooding caused by the hurricane had undermined the bridge's piers. There was concern that dredging of the river's bottom, which had been going on since the bridge was completed, may have caused the velocity of the river to speed up and helped undermine the bridge's foundation. But experts from the Interstate Commerce Commission ruled this out in November 1933.

== Later history ==
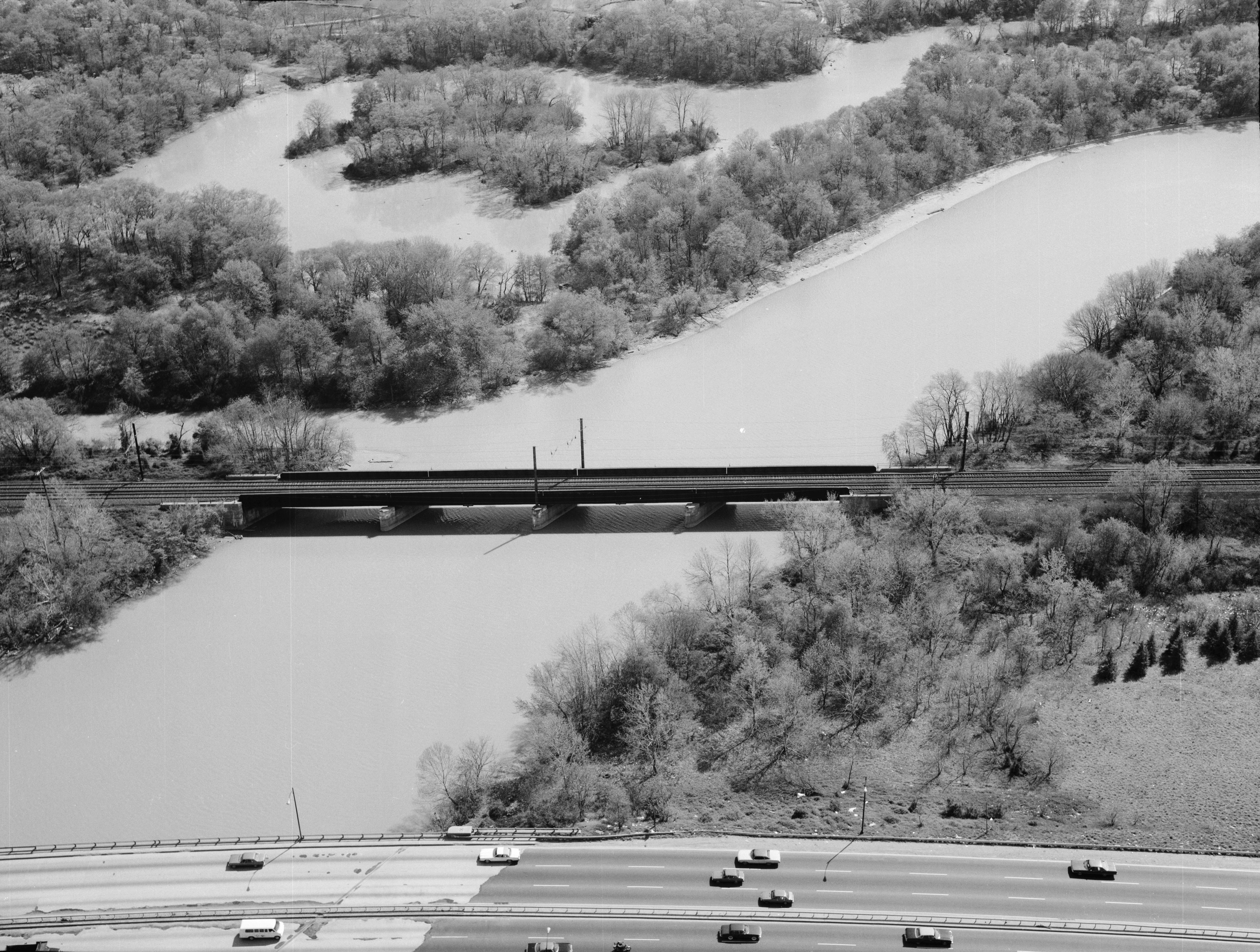
Looking south at the Amtrak Anacostia River Bridge in 1977. The New York Avenue Bridge is in the foreground.

The Pennsylvania Railroad rebuilt the bridge in 1934 and 1935. The United States Commission of Fine Arts, which had de facto approval authority over all structures built in the city, approved the plans for the new bridge in mid-December 1933. The Army Corps of Engineers approved in mid-January 1934. By July 1934, the D.C. Commissioners and National Capital Planning Commission (which had approval over all major structures and all roads, bridges, and memorials in the metropolitan area) had given their approval as well, and construction went forward. The new structure had abutments that extended an additional 10 feet (3.05 m) onto the shore on either side of the bridge, and it was 12 feet (3.66 m) rather than 10 feet (3.05 m) above the water. Protective pilings and walls were also placed around the piers to prevent fast-moving water from scouring around the piers and causing another collapse.

In 1942, a Pennsylvania Railroad bridge watchman was struck by a train and thrown from the bridge. The bridge suffered a fire early on January 24, 1944. At first, the Federal Bureau of Investigation feared that the bridge had been set on fire deliberately as an act of sabotage. But the Metropolitan Police Department said that the fire started when a night watchman dumped hot coals from the stove in his watchhouse down the embankment of the river, igniting dry brush and oil (which had dripped from passing rail cars) at the base of the bridge. A fireboat and 20 fire trucks and engines were needed to put out the blaze, which sent flames 50 feet (15.24 m) into the air. Some of the bridge's spans buckled because of the fire's heat.

Major repair work was done on the bridge in 1999. The work was done in conjunction with repairs and upgrades to the New York Avenue Bridge, a highway bridge just upstream. The work included assessing damage to and repairing the concrete piers under the bridge, replacing masonry and repairing the abutments, and repairing and maintaining the steel girders that form the bridge's superstructure.

It is unclear how safe the bridge is or its projected project lifespan. According to the Federal Railroad Administration (FRA), the federal government does not maintain an inventory of rail bridges or their condition. Nor is the federal government responsible for railroad bridge safety: "Responsibility for railroad bridge safety rests with the owner of the track carried by the structure. The owner ensures the bridge is capable of safely accommodating all rail traffic operated over the track and specifies the maximum weight the structure can support." There is also no federal law or regulation that requires railroad bridge owners to ensure the safety of their bridges. Rather, it is FRA "policy" that they do so by following the recommendations contained in the American Railway Engineering and Maintenance-of-Way Association's Manual for Railway Engineering and by inspecting bridges annually using trained, experienced inspectors.

== See also ==
- Anacostia Railroad Bridge (CSX Transportation - Freight train bridge)
