= Virginia Avenue Tunnel =

Coordinates: 38.877399°N 76.9911°W

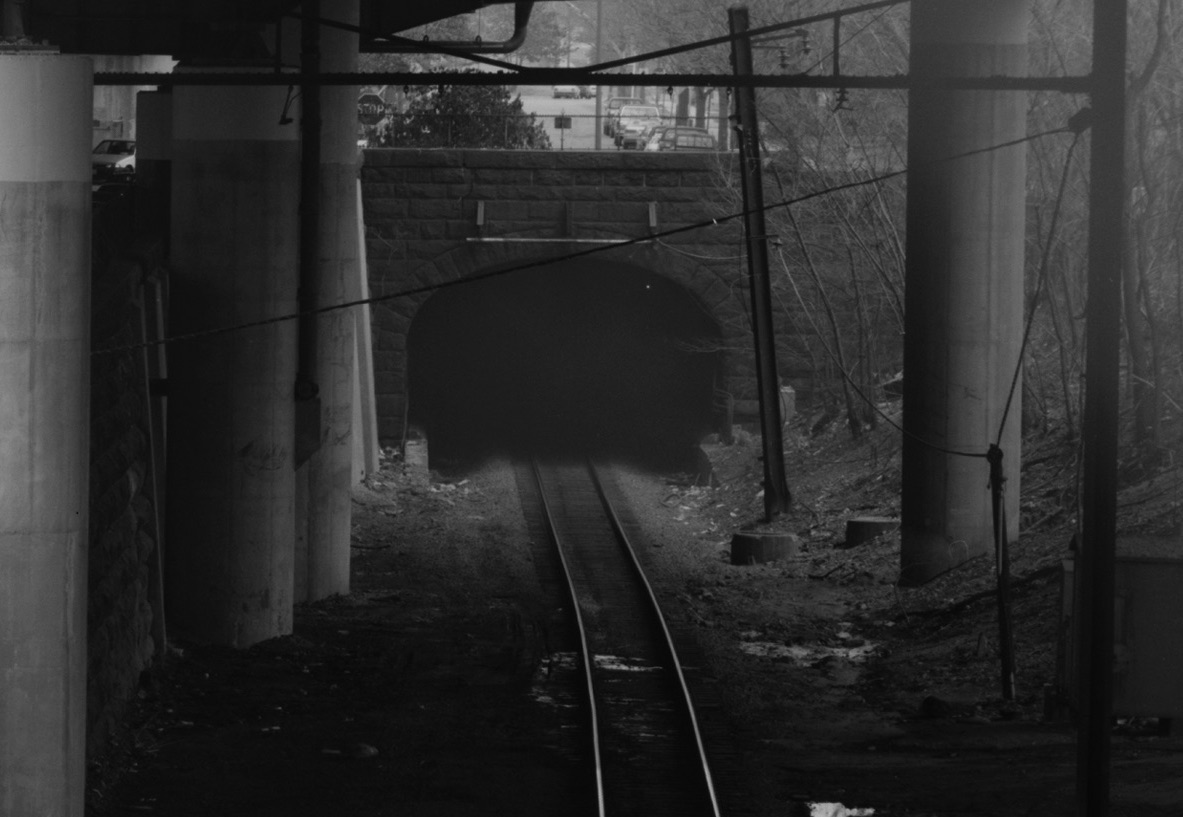
- 1992 photograph of the northwest entrance to the tunnel taken from New Jersey Avenue SE
- Interactive map of Virginia Avenue Tunnel

Overview
- Location: Washington, D.C.
- System: CSX Transportation

Operation
- Opened: 1872
- Rebuilt: 2015–2018
- Owner: CSX Transportation
- Operator: CSX Transportation
- Traffic: Train
- Character: Freight

Technical
- Length: 3,788 feet (1,155 m)
- No. of tracks: 2
- Track gauge: 1,435 mm (4 ft 8 1/2 in) standard gauge
- Operating speed: 25 mph (40 km/h)
- Tunnel clearance: 18.25 feet (5.56 m) max. for original tunnel; 21.25 feet (6.48 m) for rebuilt tunnels
- Width: 28 feet (8.5 m)

The Virginia Avenue Tunnel is a pair of railroad tunnels in Washington, D.C. owned by CSX Transportation. It is part of the CSX RF&P Subdivision and serves freight trains along the eastern seaboard routes, providing a bypass around Union Station.

The pair of single tracked tunnels is located under Virginia Avenue SE, from 12th Street SE to 2nd Street SE. The eastern portal connects to the Anacostia Railroad Bridge and the CSX Capital Subdivision. At the western end the RF&P Sub runs to the Long Bridge into Virginia.

CSX built the tunnels to replace a single tunnel constructed in 1870–1872 by the Baltimore and Potomac Railroad (B&P). That tunnel had deteriorated over the prior 140 years and CSX needed to increase the capacity to allow double-stacked containers to pass through and to allow for traffic in both directions in preparation for expected increases in rail traffic due to the widening of the Panama Canal. Construction began in 2015 and the project completed in 2018. The new tunnels were extended to 12th St SE, where the old one had ended at 11th St. SE.

== Original tunnel ==
The tunnel was constructed in 1870–1872, and finished on January 13, 1872, by the B&P and later controlled by the Pennsylvania Railroad (PRR). It originally served the B&P station on the present-day site of the National Gallery of Art, on the National Mall at 6th & B Street NW (today's Constitution Avenue) and was part of a branch line between Bowie and Alexandria that gave the PRR access to DC and the south. The tunnel was built using the cut and cover method. It was constructed of ashlar stone for the sidewalls, and brick and stone for the arches.

In 1904 the tunnel was extended to its present length due to a track relocation. Initially the tunnel served both freight and passenger service until Union Station's opening in 1908, and since that time it has been freight-only. The tunnel's second track was removed in 1936 to accommodate electrification and increasingly large railroad equipment.

== Current tunnel ==
=== Design ===
In 2008, CSX proposed to modify or replace the tunnel to provide room for a second track and sufficient height to allow use of double-stack freight cars and autoracks. The railroad also planned to address the tunnel's deteriorated structure, in particular its cracked masonry and failing drainage system.

CSX initially sought government funding in a public-private partnership as part of its National Gateway initiative, but in 2011, it announced that it would fund the tunnel project itself.

In 2012, CSX and government agencies considered four design alternatives for a new tunnel, conducting public outreach meetings, and preparing an environmental impact assessment for each of the alternatives. A final decision on the selected alternative was expected in spring 2013, but did not come until 2014.

==== Environmental impact statements and objections to the proposal ====
CSX released its Draft Environmental Impact Statement (DEIS) for the Virginia Avenue Tunnel project in July 2013. During the comment period, many local residents and organizations, including Casey Trees, the Capitol Hill Restoration Society (CHRS), the Sierra Club, and the Committee of 100 on the Federal City, expressed concerns. CHRS highlighted potential negative impacts on historic structures, economic effects on Barracks Row, and concerns about the project's impact on the L'Enfant Plan. Supporters of the tunnel argued that the project was a case of NIMBYism, while critics dismiss these claims.

Throughout the process, critics pointed to several concerns. An Environmental Protection Agency review noted several deficiencies in the DEIS, including issues related to environmental justice, health, and community impacts." Though CSX stated that it planned to use a cut-and-cover method to maintain rail and road traffic during construction, neighbors were concerned because it would necessitate partial closures of Virginia Avenue for three years. Citing the 2013 Lac-Mégantic derailment, critics expressed concern about crude oil shipments through the city, but CSX assured that the tunnel improvements would not lead to more crude oil shipments. Opponents of the new tunnels also accused CSX, DDOT, and FHWA of rushing the project without properly addressing local concerns or exploring alternative options. Congressional Delegate Eleanor Holmes Norton requested an expedited release of the FEIS in April 2014 to resolve the ongoing issue.

The FHWA released the 2,639-page FEIS on June 13, 2014, which favored renovating and replacing the existing tunnel rather than rerouting trains through new lines in Southern Maryland. The FEIS offered some financial compensation to affected residents, though many felt it did not adequately address their concerns.

Appendix A of the FEIS revealed that DDOT issued an occupancy permit in 2012, granting CSX a right-of-way, before the review was complete.

Delegate Norton requested an extension for the review period to allow residents more time to assess the impact of the project, but one was not granted.

The FHWA issued a Record of Decision, approving the tunnel project on November 4, 2014. Lawsuits attempting to stop the project were denied in court decisions, and construction on the project began in 2015.

=== Construction and opening ===
The first phase of the project was completed on December 23, 2016, when the first double-stack train passed through the newly constructed parallel tunnel. Work then began on removing the old tunnel and replacing it with a new, taller one. The full project was completed in fall 2018.

== See also ==
- First Street Tunnel (Washington, D.C.)
