= Baltimore and Potomac Railroad =

American railway (1853–1902)

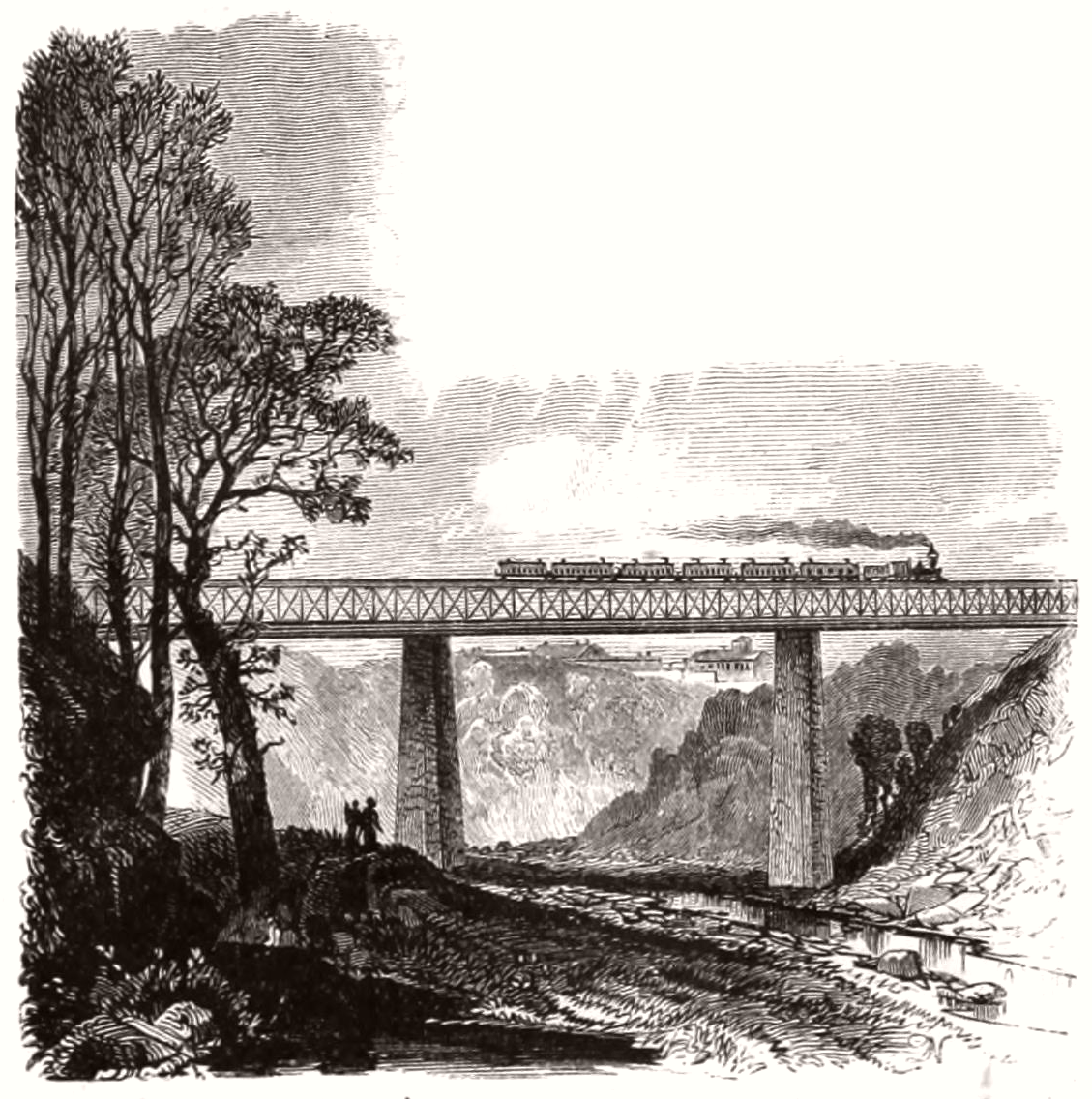
- Train crossing High Bridge over Gwynns Falls in Baltimore County, Maryland on the Baltimore and Potomac Railroad line.
- Industry: Rail transport
- Founded: May 6, 1853; 173 years ago
- Founder: Walter Bowie; Thomas Fielder Bowie; William Duckett Bowie; Oden Bowie
- Defunct: November 1, 1902
- Fate: Merged with Philadelphia, Baltimore and Washington Railroad
- Successor: Philadelphia, Baltimore and Washington Railroad
- Headquarters: Philadelphia, Pennsylvania, United States
- Area served: Maryland; Washington, D.C.
- Revenue: ▼US$290,996.29; (1892)
- Total assets: ▲US$12,791,586; (1892)

Map of the Baltimore and Potomac Railroad

The Baltimore and Potomac Railroad (B&P) was an American railroad company. It operated from Baltimore, Maryland, southwest to Washington, D.C., from 1872 to 1902. Owned and operated by the Pennsylvania Railroad, it was the second railroad company to connect the nation's capital to the Northeastern U.S., and competed with the older Baltimore and Ohio Railroad.

Part of the B&P route is now part of Amtrak's Northeast Corridor, the most heavily traveled American intercity passenger line; and of the Penn Line of the Maryland Transit Administration's MARC commuter train service. The Baltimore and Potomac Tunnel, bored under north Baltimore in 1871-73 remains in use, for now. The Virginia Avenue Tunnel built in Southeast Washington in 1870-72, was replaced in 2016-18.

== History ==
=== Origins and Construction ===
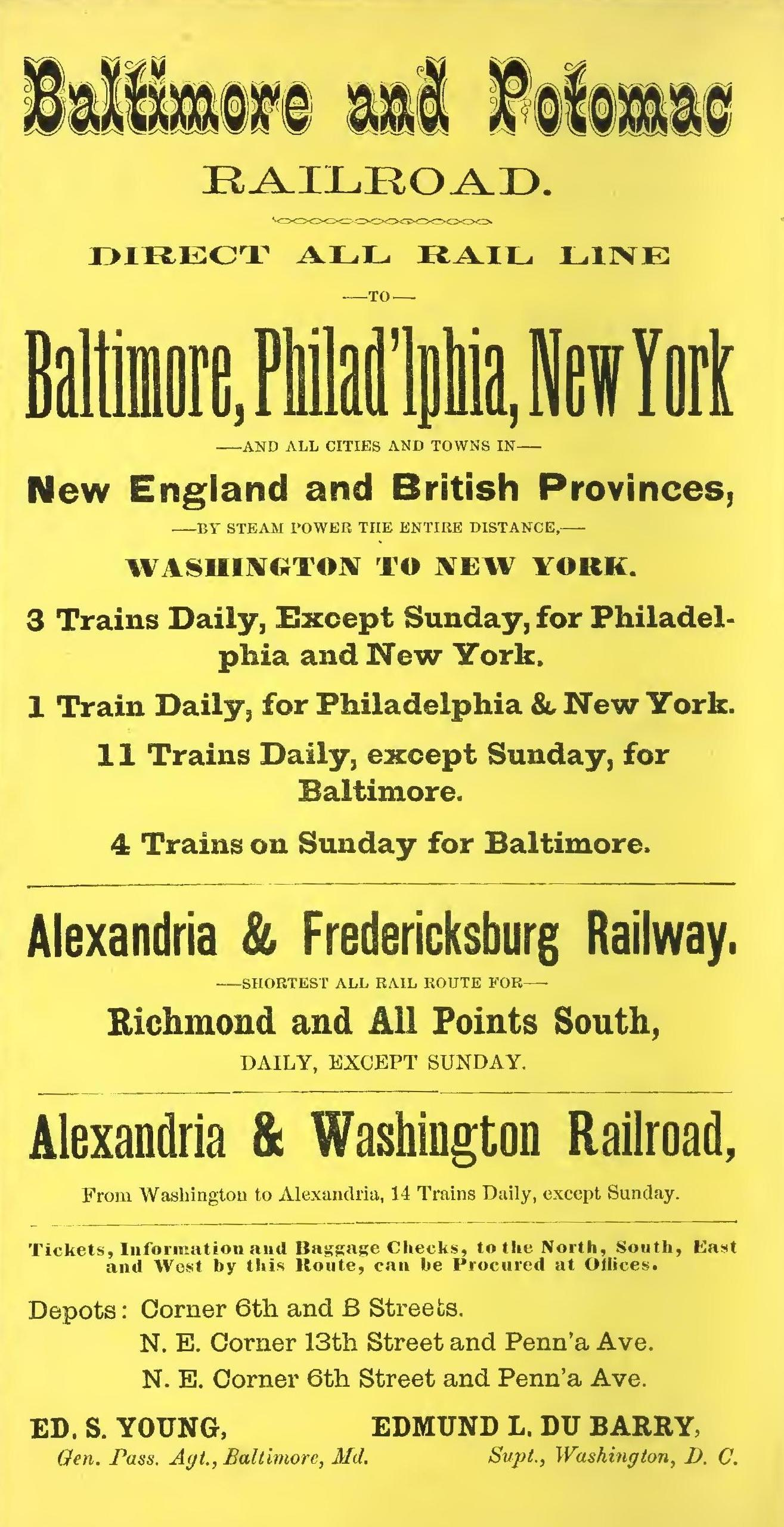
Baltimore and Potomac Railroad in an 1875 advertisement in Boyd's Directory

The leading advocate for expanding the railroad system into southern Maryland was Walter Bowie, who wrote newspaper articles and columns under the pen name Patuxent Planter and who joined Thomas Fielder Bowie, William Duckett Bowie, and Oden Bowie (later Governor of Maryland), in lobbying the Maryland General Assembly to approve the idea. Their efforts bore fruit on May 6, 1853, when lawmakers chartered the "Baltimore and Potomac Rail Road Company", granting it the authority to construct a railroad from Baltimore via Upper Marlboro in Prince George's County and Port Tobacco in neighboring Charles County to a point on the Potomac River between Liverpool Point and the St. Mary's River in St. Mary's County, southernmost in the state. The charter also allowed the construction of branches of up to 20 miles (32 km) in length. Preliminary surveying began in 1855.

The B&P was organized on December 19, 1858, and began surveying the route in earnest on May 3, 1859. Construction was then delayed by the American Civil War.

In 1866, the B&P sought permission to build a branch into Washington from a point within 2 miles of the Collington (now Bowie) Post Office in Prince George's County and also signed a contract to begin construction of the main line between Baltimore and the Potomac. The B&P was working with the Pennsylvania Railroad (PRR) and its ally, the Northern Central Railway (NCRY), which wanted its own route to Washington, DC and Virginia. Congress granted permission in an act approved February 5, 1867, the PRR then purchased a controlling share of the B&P Stock and construction of the railroad started for the section between the Annapolis and Elk Ridge Railroad (A&ERR) and Upper Marlboro in the next year. Work on the line from Bowie to the District started around the same time.

In 1869, the railroad was granted permission to use a right-of-way through the city of Baltimore, and to build an 800 foot long tunnel in the northwest of the city, to connect to the Northern Central Railway (NCRY). By the end of that year, the right-of-way had been graded from the Patapsco to the District Line and from Bowie to Upper Marlboro; and several small bridges had been constructed.

In 1870, the B&P was granted permission by Congress to extend their Washington branch across the Potomac River Railroad Bridge to Virginia, if they would maintain it. When the bridge was damaged by an October 1, 1870, flood they chose to build a replacement bridge which they began working on in November 1870. At the same time, the Alexandria and Fredericksburg Railway, chartered in 1864, was gaining permission to connect to Alexandria and thus the Long Bridge and the future B&P. By the summer of 1870, work was underway on both the Virginia Avenue Tunnel and the Anacostia Railroad Bridge; and by the fall track was being laid in a few places.

A short track was extended from the A&ERR in Annapolis to deep water to allow for the unloading of rail and ties and the B&P began laying rail south from the crossing of the A&ERR in Odenton on May 15, 1871. When they reached the Little Patuxent River, they began laying track north from Odenton to the Patapsco River - while grading the road and digging a long cut south of Odenton. By the summer a construction train was running on the line delivering materials. The bridge over the Big Patuxent was finished on August 21, 1871, and the Little Patuxent shortly before that and track was laid to Bowie by August 31. The track was the heaviest track ever used in Maryland up to that time. By September 1871, The B&P was actively building bridges across the Potomac, the Patapsco, Gwynn Falls and Anacostia; and working on the tunnels in DC and Baltimore. The first freight service was performed by October 1871. By Oct 25, the tacks had been laid all the way from Bowie to Beaver Dam. By late November the bridges over Beaver Dam and Watts Branch were complete and track had been extended to the Anacostia.

In 1872 construction continued and the first milestone was the completion of the Virginia Avenue Tunnel on January 13, 1872. Three days later they completed the bridge over the Canal at K Street and all of the track in Washington, DC. At the same time they had built a bridge over Collington Branch for the main line to Pope's Creek and by February they had built rail to within two miles of Upper Marlboro. On May 14, 1872, the new Long Bridge opened and the B&P was able to use it to bring in supplies from the south. Around the same time, Congress granted the B&P permission to build a depot at the corner of 6th and B (Now Constitution) NW on a site previously reserved for a park. The final spike for the "Main Line" to Pope's Creek was driven on June 10, 1872, but trains did not start running yet.

Passenger service on the Baltimore-Washington line started on July 2, 1872 - the same day the Alexandria and Fredericksburg line opened between Fredericksburg and Quantico. This allowed for service between Richmond and Baltimore, but only with service as far north as Lafayette Avenue in Baltimore because the tunnel there was not complete. Until the tunnel was complete people travelled between the Lafayette station and Calvert Station, where the Northern Central Railway was, by Renshaw's omnibuses. Service to Richmond was possible because the Potomac Railroad between Quantico and Fredericksburg had opened in May 1872. The B&P opened with temporary depots in DC and in Baltimore which were replaced later with permanent ones and 20 stations, many of which were still not complete. On the same day, telegraph operations started along the line.

The B&P started running freight trains on the Pope's Creek Branch to Marlboro later in the summer of 1872 and passenger trains there by November. The line to Pope's Creek was finished in late December, formally opened on January 1, 1873, and the first trains were run the next day. It was immediately relegated to branch status.

The final section of the B&P, the Baltimore and Potomac Tunnel under Winchester Street and Wilson Street in Baltimore, opened on June 29, 1873, connecting the line to the PRR's Northern Central Railway (north to Harrisburg) and Baltimore's existing Calvert Street Station. A month later, on July 24, 1873, the Union Railroad also opened, extending the line eastward through another tunnel to the PRR's other Baltimore line, the Philadelphia, Wilmington & Baltimore Railroad (PW&B) northeast to Delaware and Pennsylvania. It was almost entirely paid for by the PRR and NCRY. Together the new railroads connected Baltimore, and the northern railroads, to Richmond and all of the Southern rail.

=== Connections and Crossings ===
In late 1873-74, the Washington City and Point Lookout Railroad, working with the Baltimore and Ohio Railroad, built the Baltimore, Washington and Alexandria Branch Railroad between Hyattsville, MD and Shepherd's Landing in Washington, DC which required the construction of a Howe truss bridge over the B&P line near Cheverly, MD.

In August 1873, the Western Maryland Railway was connected to the B&P just west of the B&P tunnel at Fulton Avenue, thus creating a new connection all the way to Hagerstown.

=== Baltimore and Potomac Station in Washington, D.C. ===
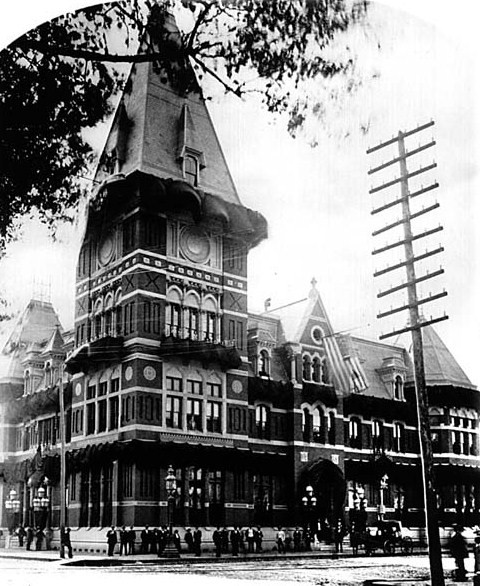
Baltimore and Potomac Railroad Passenger Terminal, on the future National Mall in Washington, D.C. U.S. President James A. Garfield was assassinated in 1881 in this since demolished station.

The first Baltimore and Potomac station in Washington was a simple wood-frame structure. A more substantial brick and stone building opened in 1873 at the southwest corner of Sixth Street and B Street NW, later renamed Constitution Avenue. This is the present site of the West Building of the National Gallery of Art, on the National Mall. The station was built over the old Washington City Canal, which complicated the construction of the foundation. Tracks ran south from the station along Sixth Street to a wye junction at Sixth Street SW, Maryland Avenue SW, and Virginia Avenue SW.

On the morning of July 2, 1881, U.S. President James A. Garfield was shot in the waiting room of the B&P station in Washington, D.C. Although the shot was not fatal, he died in September 1881 as a result of infections from the injury.

On November 1, 1902, B&P was consolidated with PW&B to form the Philadelphia, Wilmington and Baltimore Railroad (PB&W) and the new railroad came under the control of the PRR.

=== New Washington Union Station alignment ===
The Washington Terminal Company and its Union Station opened in 1907, serving the PB&W, the B&O and several other railroads. All PB&W passenger trains from Baltimore were diverted to a new alignment called the Magruder Branch, splitting from the old one at Landover and running west to run parallel with the B&O Washington Branch on the approach to the new station.

=== Ownership changes and breakup ===
In 1968, the B&P came under the control of Penn Central. Amtrak took over intercity passenger service on the Washington Branch in 1971, while Penn Central continued to operate commuter service, without subsidy, until it went bankrupt in 1976. Conrail gained ownership after the Penn Central bankruptcy and it continued to provide commuter services on the line until 1983, when the railroad transferred its commuter rail services in Boston, New York, Philadelphia, and the Baltimore-Washington area to local and state governments. In the case of the Washington Branch, MARC took over commuter rail service but did not buy the line as in 1981 Amtrak had bought it. But MARC did buy some other property, like the Odenton train station which was not served by Amtrak.

The Pope's Creek Subdivision to Faulkner was retained by Conrail. Following the breakup of Conrail in 1999, Norfolk Southern provided freight service over the Washington Branch and CSX Transportation handled the Pope's Creek freight traffic.

== Branches ==
=== Catonsville ===
The Catonsville Short Line Railroad opened in 1884 and was immediately leased by the Baltimore & Potomac. This provided a short branch from just south of Baltimore to Catonsville.

=== Pope's Creek Subdivision ===
The 48.7-mile (78.4 km) branch to Popes Creek was part of the original chartered main line, but from opening in 1873 (It started running freight to Marlboro in 1872) it was operated as a branch of the main line from the junction at Bowie. The main line from Bowie to Washington, a distance of 17.1 miles (27.5 km), was provided for in the charter as a branch.

Two lines were built off of off Pope's Creek, one going to Mechanicsville and the other to Naval Proving Ground, Indian Head. The Mechanicsville line was eventually extended to the Patuxent River Naval Air Station at Cedar Point. Later a line was built off the Cedar Point line that went to the Chalk Point Generating Station - called the Herbert Subdivision. The Cedar Point line south of Hughesville was abandoned in the 1960's and the Indian Head line

There were several passenger and freight stations on the Pope's Creek Line, including a passenger and freight station at Collington. Today, a 5,200-foot railroad siding is all that remains of this stop, although the spur is still in use. It is located at milepost 3.0 on the spur, just south of where the spur crosses under Maryland Route 450 near Maryland Route 197.

| Preceded by | Baltimore and Potomac Rail Road Company chartered May 6, 1853 merged November 1, 1902 | Succeeded by Philadelphia, Baltimore and Washington Railroad |
