= Baltimore and Potomac Railroad Station =

Defunct railroad station in Washington, D.C., United States

Baltimore and Potomac Railroad Station Pennsylvania Railroad Station
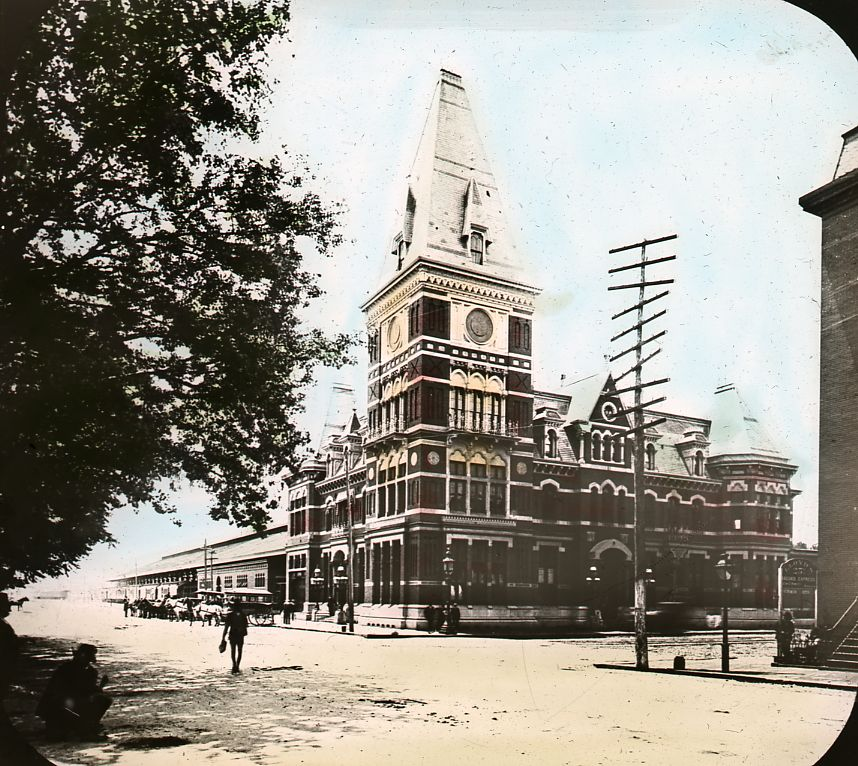
- The B&P Railroad Station

General information
- Location: Corner of B Street NW & 6th Street NW; Washington, D.C.
- Coordinates: 38°53′30″N 77°01′13″W
- Owner: Pennsylvania Railroad
- Operator: Baltimore and Potomac Railroad

Construction
- Structure type: At-grade
- Architect: Wilson Brothers & Company

History
- Opened: 1873
- Closed: October 14, 1907 (line moved to Union Station)

Former services
Preceding station	Pennsylvania Railroad	Following station
Terminus	Philadelphia, Wilmington and Baltimore Railroad	Navy Yard toward Philadelphia
Preceding station	Chesapeake and Ohio Railway	Following station
Alexandria toward Cincinnati	Main Line	Terminus
Preceding station	Southern Railway	Following station
Alexandria toward Birmingham	Main Line	Terminus
Preceding station	Richmond, Fredericksburg and Potomac Railroad	Following station
St. Asaph Junction toward Richmond: Broad Street or Main Street	Main Line	Terminus
Location
- Location within Washington, D.C.

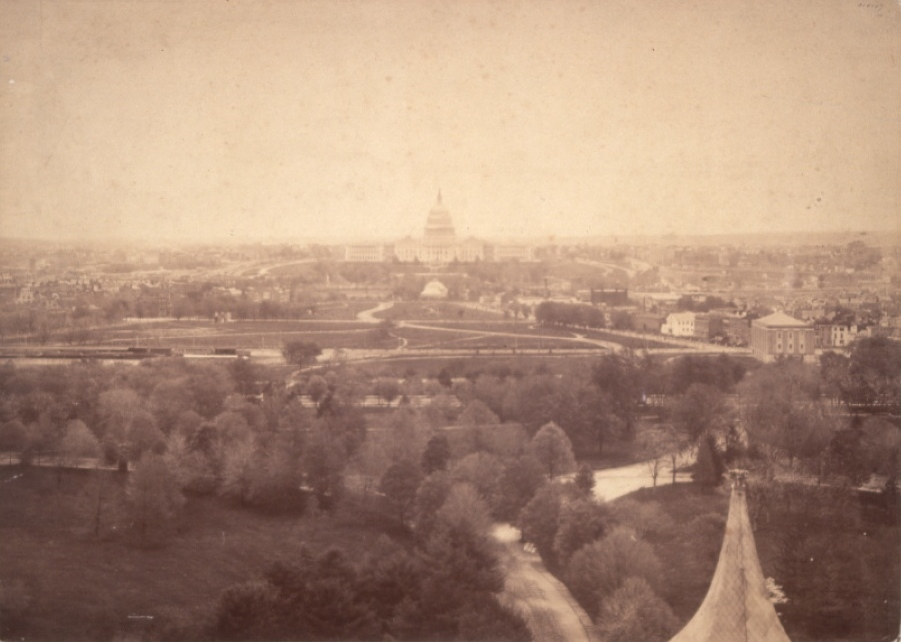
View of the eastern side of the Mall in 1879. A train at the station can be seen on the left. The square building on the right is the Armory.

The Baltimore and Potomac Railroad Station, also known as Pennsylvania Railroad Station, was a railroad station that was owned by the Pennsylvania Railroad and operated by the Baltimore and Potomac Railroad in Washington, D.C., from July 2, 1872 until its closure in 1907. It was located at the southern corner of 6th street NW and B Street NW (now Constitution Avenue), now the site of the West Building of the National Gallery of Art. The train station gained infamy as the site where United States President James A. Garfield was shot by Charles J. Guiteau on July 2, 1881; Garfield died two months later from infections to his wounds.

== Description ==
The main building of the station had a 120-foot frontage on B Street NW and a 90-foot frontage on 6th Street. It was in Victorian Gothic style, 55 feet high, of pressed red brick with black mortar and belt courses of Ohio freestone. There were three towers covered with elaborate roofs of red, blue and green slate and decorated with ornamental iron, including a 100-foot clock tower on the corner. The lower level housed waiting rooms, baggage rooms, and ticket offices, with offices above.

More land was purchased on Virginia Avenue to house locomotives. An iron train shed south of the terminal building was erected on screw piles. It was 600 feet long and 120 feet wide and had 25-foot decorated iron columns supporting an arched roof approximately 50 feet high at its crown. The arch was decorated with an eagle and the sides with ornamental figures. The building was lighted from above and the lower part opposite the government grounds was faced with ornamental scroll work.

Tracks ran south from the station along 6th Street to a wye junction at Sixth Street SW, Maryland Avenue SW, and Virginia Avenue SW. Ironically, the tracks along Maryland Avenue ran over the Long Bridge to Virginia, and the tracks along Virginia Avenue went east into Maryland (Landover Subdivision).

== History ==
=== Approval in Congress ===
The Baltimore and Potomac Railroad, opened on July 2, 1872, operated between Baltimore and Washington, where it initially erected a temporary wooden-framed station building. On April 1, 1872, by a vote of 115 ayes and 55 nays the House of Representatives passed a bill that allowed the Baltimore and Potomac Railroad (owned by the Pennsylvania Railroad) to build a depot on the lot at the corner of 6th Street NW and B Street NW, just north of the Armory. The bill had been filibustered for some time by opponents. On May 21, 1872, An Act to confirm the Action of the Board of Aldermen and Common Council of the City of Washington, designating a Depot Site for the Baltimore and Potomac Railroad Company, and for other Purposes was ratified.

The paragraph pertaining to the depot itself reads:

Beginning at the southwest corner of Sixth Street and B street north, running west one hundred and fifty feet along B street; thence south eight hundred and two feet to the present line of the canal; thence east one hundred and fifty feet to the line of Sixth Street; thence north by line of Sixth Street to the place of beginning; and the said company shall, so far as the United States can so provide, have the right to hold, use, and occupy may use the said grounds for the purpose of constructing thereon a passenger depot, to be used by the said company for passenger and express-freight traffic, and for no other purposes.

=== Construction ===
Preparation of the site began before the bill passed. It was located one block from the city's largest market, Center Market, which opened a few months later the same year. Temporary platforms were erected, and construction crews started preparing to lay track up Sixth Street. The station was designed by Joseph M. Wilson, architect and principal assistant engineer of the construction department of the Pennsylvania Railroad; the engineer in charge was Joseph Wood.

The site presented problems since it was a former marsh, the bed of Tiber Creek; the station was built over the old Washington City Canal. A foundation of five feet of Ohio freestone was laid over pilings driven ten feet deep.

The new station opened in 1873. Construction was completed on July 16, 1874, and a celebration with a collection for the workmen was held at Platz's Saloon.

=== James A. Garfield assassination ===
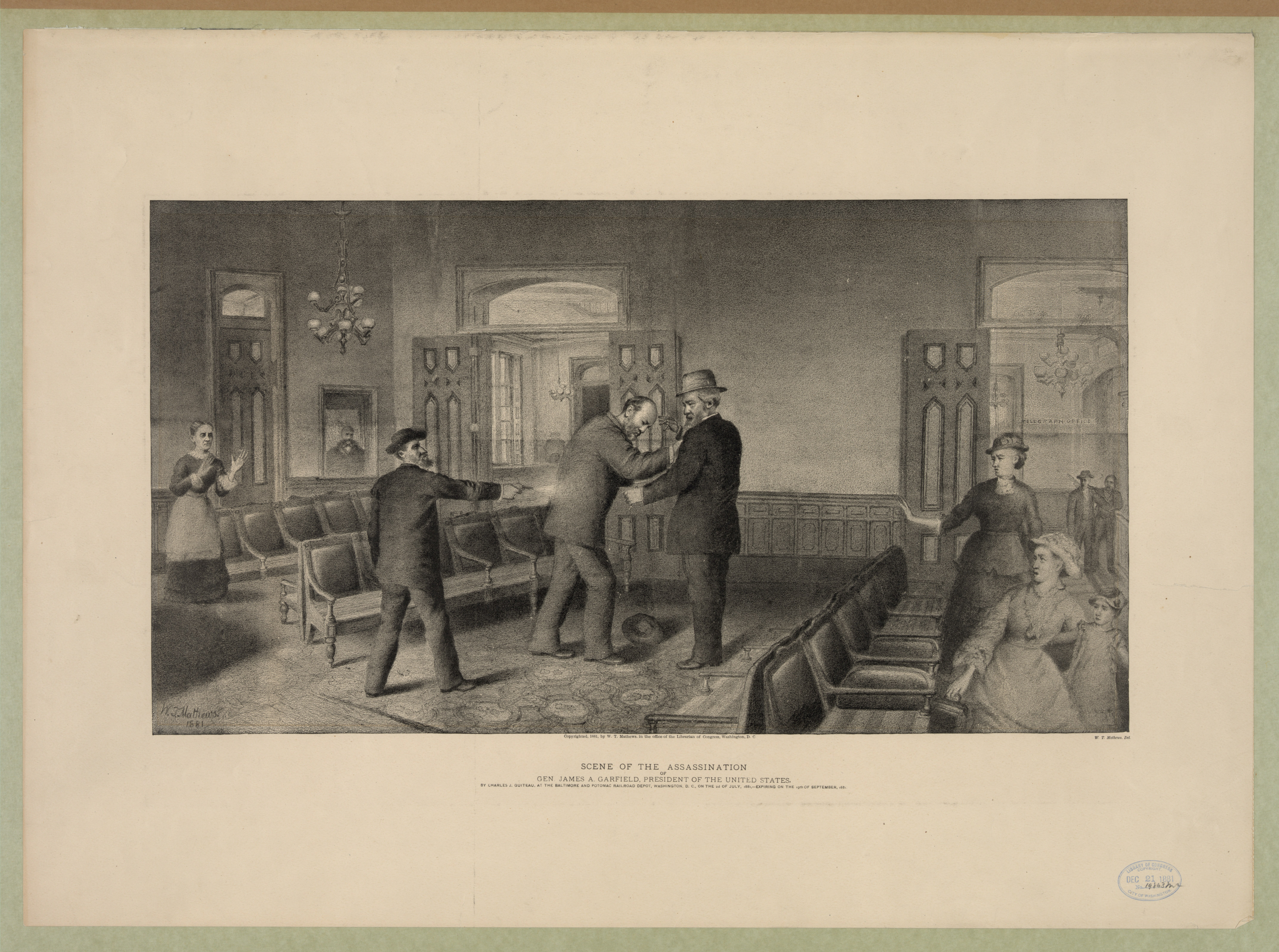
Contemporary illustration of the shooting

On July 2, 1881, it was announced in the local newspapers that United States President James A. Garfield would be leaving for his summer vacation. En route to board a train to New Jersey, he was shot in the back by assassin Charles Guiteau while walking across the lobby of the Baltimore and Potomac station with James G. Blaine. While the president survived the initial shooting, doctors subsequently probed his wounds with non-sterilized objects in a frantic search for the bullet. The bacterial infections they introduced to the wound were the likely cause of his eventual death on September 19.

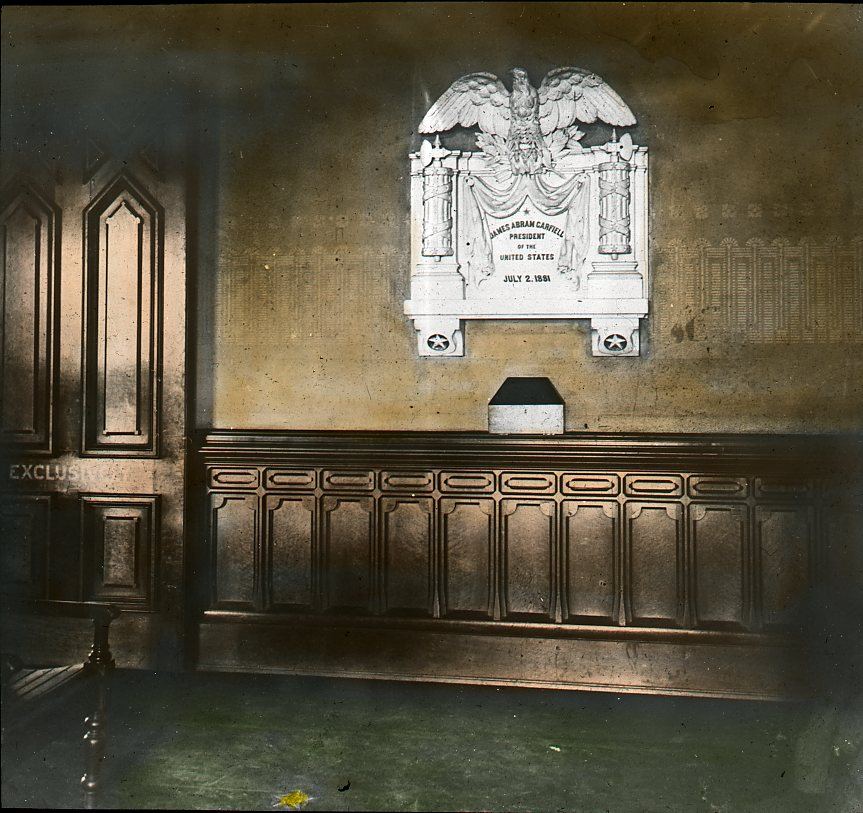
Memorial marker in the station with gold star on the floor

A marker was placed on the train station wall after the death of the President, and a gold star was placed on the floor to mark the spot. The marker and the star were lost when the station was razed in 1908.

Garfield Circle with the James A. Garfield Monument is located six blocks southeast of where he was shot. The monument was unveiled on May 12, 1887, while the station was still active and the assassination still in the local memory.

On March 2, 2019, the National Park Service erected exhibit panels to mark the site of the assassination.

=== Closure and demolition ===
In 1907, both the New Jersey Avenue Station and the Baltimore and Potomac Railroad Station shut down to relocate to the newly built Union Station. The B&O Railway decided to start running trains from Union Station as of October 26, 1907, while the Pennsylvania Railway set itself a deadline of November 16, 1907.

On March 15, 1908, the Philadelphia, Baltimore and Washington Railway Company released its rights to the station at 6th Street NW and B Street NW to the United States government for $1,500,000. According to a local newspaper, the station was demolished by order of President Theodore Roosevelt before December 17, 1908, without authority or notice to the public.

=== Site ===
By 1914, the site had become the designated location for the George Washington Memorial Association's George Washington Memorial Building. However, the site was occupied by two temporary war buildings from 1918 to 1921. On November 14, 1921, a ceremony took place to lay the cornerstone for the new building.

However, the building never materialized and in 1937, it was decided to use the site for the National Gallery of Art. Construction on the foundation started that year. On August 21, 1937, The Washington Post reported that the cornerstone had been dug up. A small metal box had been found inside and handed to David E. Finley, trustee for the Gallery of Art. It was passed on to A. K. Shipe, former attorney of the ill-fated project. A large gold star was found in the box; this was believed at the time to be the gold star from the train station marking the spot where President Garfield had been shot.

The West Building of the National Gallery of Art on the National Mall was completed on the site and was accepted on behalf of the American people by President Franklin D. Roosevelt on March 17, 1941.
