= First Street Tunnel =

Rail tunnel in Washington, DC

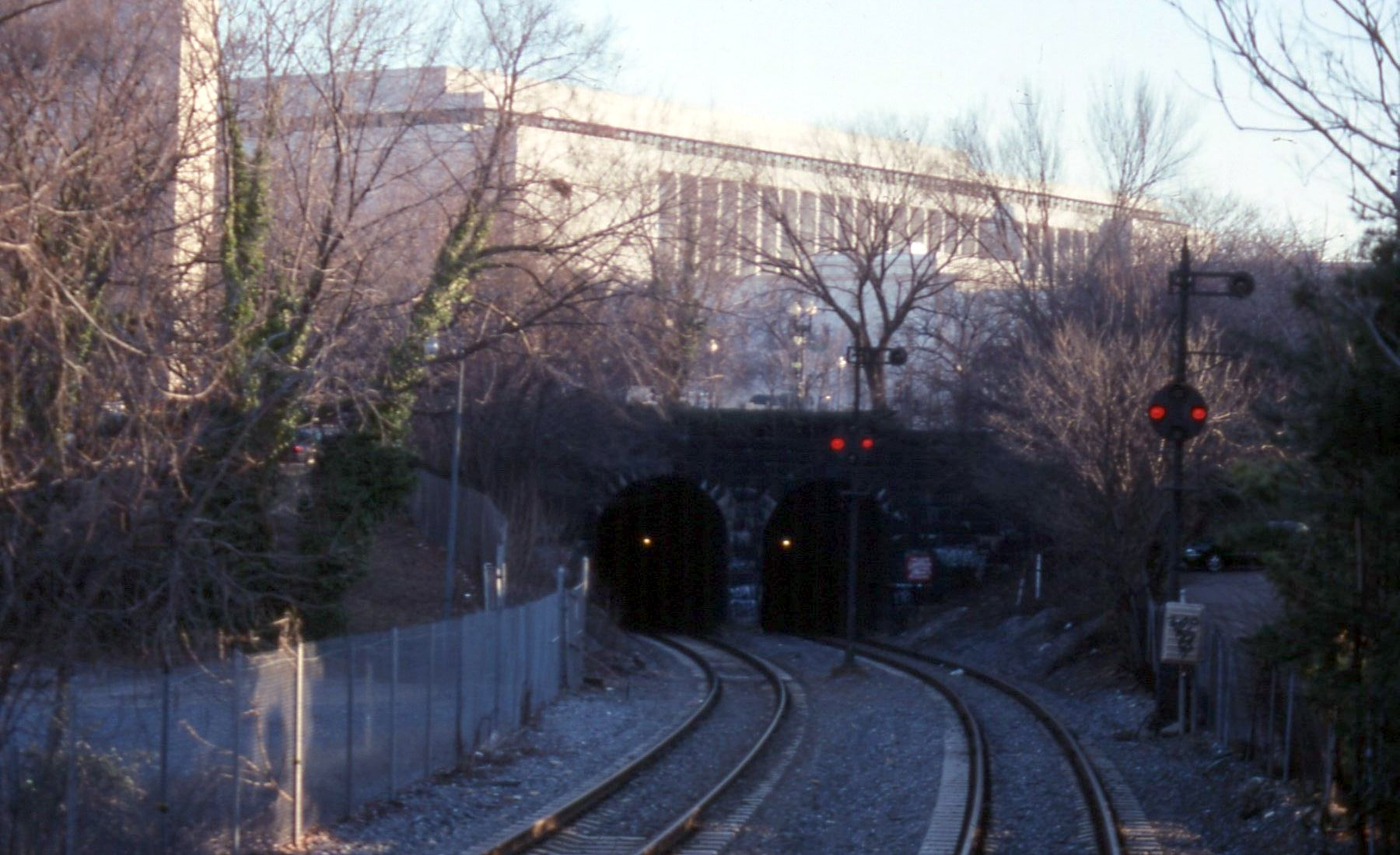
- The south portals in 1999.
- Interactive map of First Street Tunnel

Overview
- Location: Washington, D.C., U.S.
- Coordinates: 38.88485°N 77.00755°W
- System: Amtrak

Operation
- Constructed: 1904-1906
- Opened: 1906
- Owner: Amtrak
- Traffic: Train
- Character: Passenger

Technical
- Length: 4,033 ft (1,229 m)
- No. of tracks: 2 single-track tubes
- Track gauge: 1,435 mm (4 ft 8 1/2 in) standard gauge
- Min elevation: 63 ft (19.2 m) below street
- Tunnel clearance: 17 ft (5.18 m)
- Width: Each tube 16 ft (4.88 m)
- Grade: 0.13%

The First Street Tunnel is a two-track, soft-earth tunnel built between 1904 and 1906 by the Washington Terminal Company to serve as the southern approach to Union Station in Washington, D.C. Currently owned by Amtrak, it connects to lower-level tracks and platforms at the station, passes under Capitol Hill and connects to the RF&P Subdivision (CSX Transportation) and Long Bridge, offering through railway service to Alexandria, Virginia, and points west and south.

Unlike the Northeast Corridor tracks north of Union Station, the tunnel tracks are not electrified, so southbound trains leaving Union Station must switch to diesel locomotives before entering the tunnel. Exiting Union Station, the tunnel runs due south under First Street NE and SE before curving to the southwest under a parking lot near the Capitol South Metro station. Its southern portal is just east of South Capitol Street at the intersection of D Street SE and New Jersey Avenue SE.

The tunnel's height is 17 feet (5.2 m).

Amtrak announced that the tunnel will be partially shut down from October 16, 2026 to October 26, 2026 to allow for the replacement of components at A-Interlocking which have exceeded their design life.

== See also ==
- Virginia Avenue Tunnel
