= Anacostia Line =

Unfinished streetcar line in Washington, D.C.

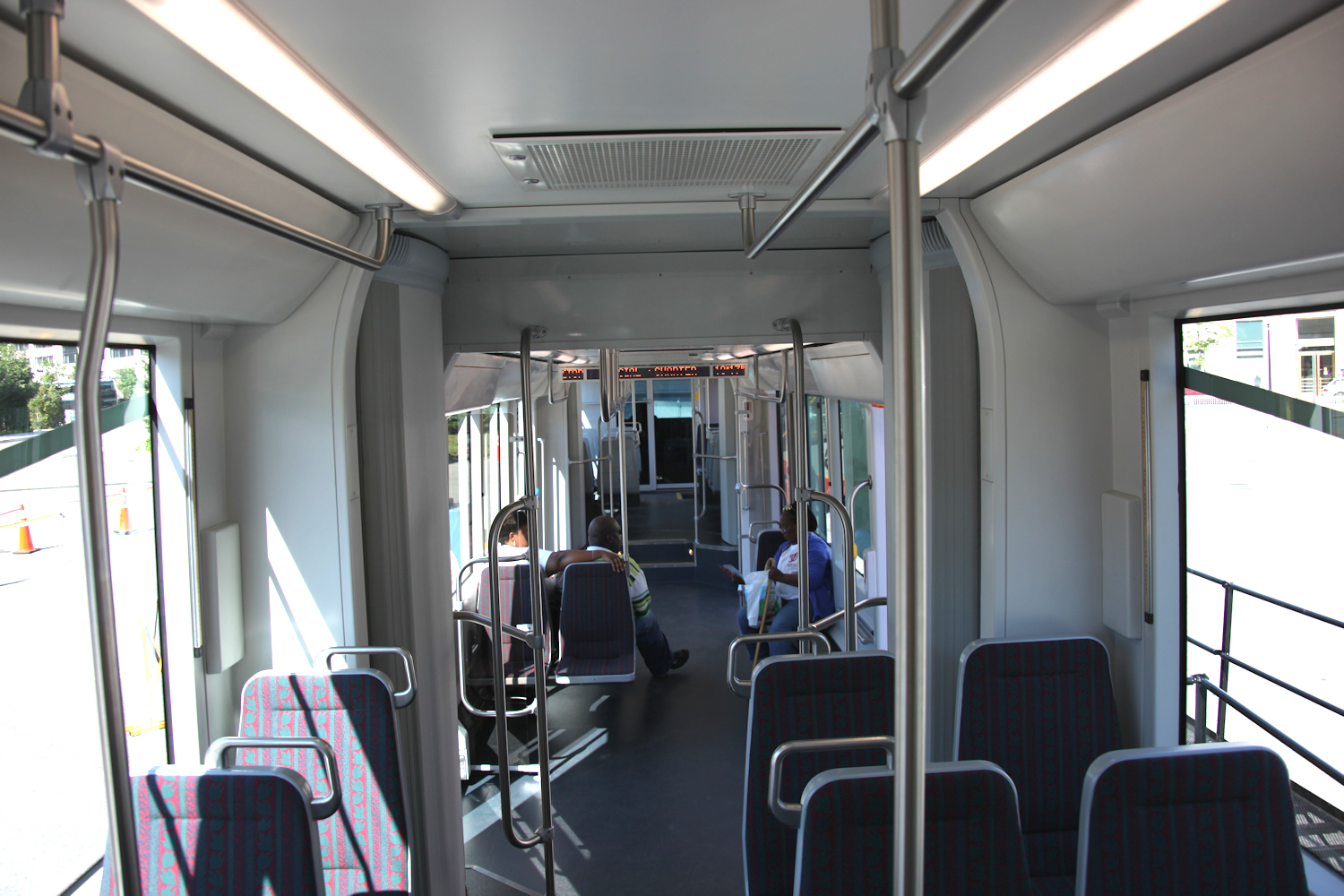
Interior of a DC Streetcar vehicle constructed in 2006–7 for use on the Anacostia Line.

The Anacostia Line is a partially constructed line of the DC Streetcar, never put into service, intended to connect the Anacostia neighborhood with Joint Base Anacostia–Bolling. Construction occurred in 2009 and 2010, but was terminated before the line was complete.

== History ==
=== First line proposal ===
The D.C. City Council approved an expenditure of $310 million for the streetcar project in September 2002. The first line to be built would be a 7.2-mile (11.6 km) "starter" streetcar line in Anacostia. The goal of the project was to bring light rail to Anacostia first (rather than last, as had happened with Metrorail), and to provide a speedier, more cost-effective way to link the neighborhood with the rest of the city.

Initially, the line was planned to run along the abandoned CSX railway tracks (known as the Shepherd Industrial Spur) from the Minnesota Avenue Metro station to the Anacostia Metro station, then cross the 11th Street Bridges before connecting with the Navy Yard – Ballpark and Waterfront Metro stations. DDOT originally planned to purchase diesel multiple unit cars (self-propelled rail cars powered by diesel engines) from Colorado Railcar. Lyndsey Layton, reporting in The Washington Post, asserted the cars would be the first of their kind to be built in the United States and approved by the Federal Railroad Administration.

==== Financial problems ====
Financing for the plan proved problematic. The same month that the D.C. government agreed to co-fund the streetcar project, Metro formally changed its strategic plan and proposed spending $12 billion over 10 years on rapid bus, light rail, and streetcar projects throughout the D.C. area. Metro proposed allocating half the total amount to build the D.C. streetcar line, complete the Silver Line, build a streetcar line on Columbia Pike in Arlington County in Virginia, and build a Purple Line light rail link between Bethesda and New Carrollton in Maryland. However, state and local governments said they were unable to fund Metro's proposal, and the planned projects died.

The District of Columbia subsequently decided to build the initial components of the DC Streetcar system on its own. The Anacostia line was scaled back to a demonstration project just 2.7 miles (4.3 km) in length with only four stations: Bolling Air Force Base, the Anacostia Metro station, the intersection of Martin Luther King, Jr. Avenue SE and Good Hope Road SE, and the Minnesota Avenue Metro station. DDOT began an environmental assessment of the CSX tracks in July 2003. In September 2004, Metro agreed to move ahead with the project (whose $45 million cost was now being funded completely by the District of Columbia), with construction to start in November 2004 and end in 2006.

==== Groundbreaking ====
Ground was broken for the Anacostia Line on November 13, 2004, and two more stations were added to the line (for a total of six). District officials also decided that rather than diesel-propelled cars, the demonstration cars would be electric multiple unit cars drawing power from overhead lines. The Anacostia Line was permitted to use overhead lines, which are less expensive to install and maintain but which are prohibited within the historic city limits, because it is outside the old City of Washington. Three such cars were ordered in 2005 from DPO-Inekon (now known as Inekon Trams).

==== Work stopped ====
However, 10 months into the project, DDOT and Metro temporarily mothballed the streetcar line. Two days after the groundbreaking, CSX announced it would abandon the railway track but refuse to allow the city to use it for the streetcar project. DDOT officials say they believed that only the city and CSX owned the land under the tracks, but a legal review found that CSX was not the only private owner. The city was unwilling to build the project on the CSX tracks, only to have the other owners demand payment in the future. CSX disputed these claims, saying that it had the legal right to lease the tracks and land in perpetuity to the city for $16 million. Subsequently, DDOT announced that the streetcars would run on city streets instead of heavy railroad track, angering local residents who said the streetcars would worsen traffic congestion, eliminate parking, and reduce bus service.

=== New bids ===
DDOT and Metro announced in April 2006 that work on the revised streetcar line in Anacostia would start again in a few months. The new deadline for completion of the now-$10 million, 1.1-mile (1.7 km) line was set for the spring of 2008. Construction on the $3 million rail cars was complete in spring 2007, and the cars were tested on the streets of Ostrava in the Czech Republic at that time and then placed into indefinite storage there. In November 2007, work on the high-voltage electrical infrastructure needed for the light rail system was under way, the line was now planned to be 1.3 miles (2.1 km) long, and the projected cost was $30 million. Track construction was due to begin in the spring of 2008, with completion of the line anticipated for 2009. By 2008, completion of the line had slipped to late 2009.

DDOT opened bids for the now-$45 million contract to construct the Anacostia Line's tracks and infrastructure in August 2008. The city had intended to transfer $10 million from demolition of the 11th Street Bridges to fund the line, but put that plan on hold due to delays in the streetcar project. DDOT also canceled plans to run the streetcars up Good Hope Road SE to the Minnesota Avenue Metro station, creating the line's terminus at the Anacostia Gateway building (at the intersection of Martin Luther King, Jr. Avenue SE and Good Hope Road SE). In March 2009, these changes reduced the cost to just $25 million, but design changes in the new 11th Street Bridges (to be completed in 2011) meant that the streetcar could be extended over the bridges to link up with proposed streetcar lines on 8th Street SE and Pennsylvania Avenue SE. However, DDOT had yet to award any track construction contract by this time. The contract was finally awarded to Fort Myer Construction Corp. in December 2008.

In April 2009, DDOT announced that the Anacostia streetcar line would not be complete until at least 2012. The delays had caused the warranty on the mothballed Czech-produced streetcars to expire, and storage costs were running $860,000 a year. Construction of the first segment of the line (from Bolling Air Force Base to the Anacostia Station) was to have begun in February 2009, but DDOT and the D.C. Water and Sewer Authority could not agree on the necessary permits or construction timing.

==== Construction begins and ends ====
Track to the Anacostia Station finally began to be laid in September 2009, with a completion date in the fall of 2012. DDOT ordered the transfer of the streetcars from the Czech Republic in late 2009, and the three rail cars arrived on December 12, 2009. In July 2008, DDOT said a streetcar on the Anacostia Line train would take 10 minutes to travel from one station to the next on its route, and the line was predicted to serve 1,400 riders daily.

On August 26, 2010, DDOT officials ordered construction of the Anacostia Line shut down after city officials refused to extend the construction contract or give a new contract to another firm. Although $25 million had been spent over the past two years, rails at the intersection of Firth Stirling Avenue SE and Suitland Parkway were buried under asphalt and weeds grew among the rails at South Capitol Street and Bolling Air Force Base. DDOT officials pledged to finish the Anacostia Line project by December 2012, but said they would either fold the project into the Phase II construction plan (which is intended to expand the streetcar system along Rhode Island Avenue NE, Florida Avenue NW, along U Street and Calvert Streets NW, and into Georgetown) or issue a new contract that extends the build-out and thus makes the yearly costs of the contract less expensive. DDOT officials denied the project was mothballed, but admitted that they had not cost out a new contract and had not requested bids on a new contract.

=== 2010: funding issue, plans revised ===
On October 23, 2010, D.C. transportation officials published a revised plan for the DC Streetcar system. The new plan envisioned opening the H Street/Benning Road and Anacostia lines in March or April 2012. It also significantly scaled back the Anacostia Line, truncating the northern end of the line at the Anacostia Metro station. The plan estimated the cost of constructing the two lines at $194 million, with operating costs at about $8 million per year. DDOT officials said they believed 6,350 riders per day would pay the $1 fare in the system's first year, with ridership tripling to 23,450 riders a day in 2015. The cars would be equipped to accept SmarTrip cards but not cash, and officials said anyone transferring from Metro to the DC Streetcar system using a SmarTrip card would ride for free. The streetcars were expected to operate every 10 to 15 minutes, seven days a week, during the same hours Metro's rail system was in operation.

Funding for completion of the two lines was still unclear, however. DDOT had applied for a $110 million federal grant, but had already lost a competition for an $18 million grant. City planners said they continued to look at tapping into a $180 million fund designed to service Metro's debt, enacting BID or zoning taxes in areas affected by the streetcar system, or creating public-private partnerships that would tap into private money for construction in exchange for tax breaks or concessions by the city. The overhead electrical wire issue also remained unresolved in the plan (although battery-operated cars were mentioned). Finally, the plan laid out a process for selecting a third party to operate the system (which may or may not be Metro). Funding issues continued to raise concern in other ways, too. The rising cost of the project became an issue in the reelection bid of D.C. City Council member Tommy Wells, whose ward encompasses H Street. The City Council held a hearing on the newly unveiled plan on November 16. Five days later, angry business owners along H Street demanded a tax refund and a moratorium on tax sales during a second council hearing. Business owners said construction of the streetcar line had caused sales to drop by as much as 70 percent, and City Council member Jim Graham introduced legislation establishing a $7 million fund to help businesses impacted by the construction.

==== Revised service plan ====
Despite DDOT's assertions in August, on October 24, 2010, D.C. officials unveiled a revised master plan for the DC Streetcar system which showed the Anacostia Line's northern end truncating at the Anacostia Metro Station (rather than connecting with the 11th Street Bridges). DDOT officials said they expected ridership on the Anacostia Line to be very low, because the new line was so short (now just 0.75 miles or 1.21 kilometers) and connected only the Navy Annex with the Metro station.

In January 2012, The Washington Post reported that the line was still planned to run along Firth Sterling Avenue. But planning for the line remained in flux, as both the Federal Transit Administration and DDOT held yet another series of public meetings in 2012.

On October 8, 2012, DDOT Director Terry Bellamy said the city was still working on plans to open an Anacostia line in Ward 8.

In 2014, DDOT said it was planning to spend $64 million to begin construction on the Anacostia Line Extension from the Anacostia Metro station to the 11th Street Bridges. The agency said it would also spend another $16 million to acquire the right-of-way currently owned by railroad company CSX Transportation and $15 million to build a car barn for the line extension. DDOT applied for a $20 million National Infrastructure Investments — Consolidated Appropriations Act grant to assist it in building the extension.

=== Competition ===
Potential competition to the Anacostia line arose in January 2013. The Capitol Riverfront Business Improvement District, a tax-financed group promoting business and residential development along the north bank of the Anacostia River between 2nd Street SW and 15th Street SE, proposed constructing a light rail line between Union Station and St. Elizabeths Hospital. The line — whose route was not proposed — would more directly link the growing Union Station area with the large Department of Homeland Security workforce headquarters being built on the St. Elizabeths campus, while encouraging use of the Capitol Riverfront area (which itself began undergoing a major redevelopment). Capitol Riverfront officials said there had been no discussions about whether the proposed light rail link would be part of the DC Streetcar system or a separate transportation component.

=== Cancellation ===
The DC Streetcar was officially shut down on March 31, 2026 after Mayor Muriel Bowser announced a 2026 budget proposal that would end funding for the streetcars in May 2025. This brought along with it the permanent cancellation of the partially-completed Anacostia line.
