= Washington Terminal Company =

Amtrak subsidiary that supports railroads in Washington, D.C.

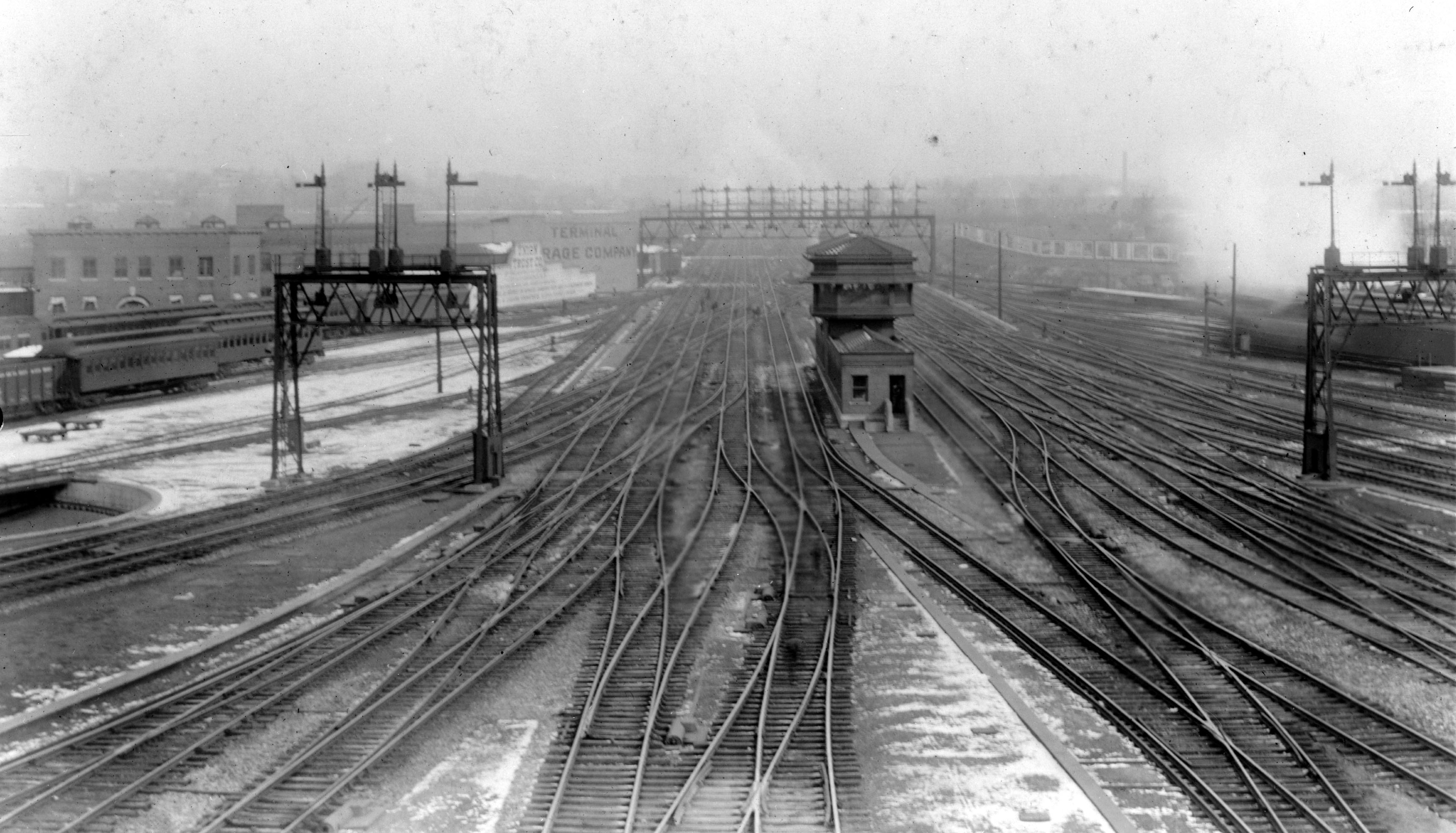
Rail yard immediately north of Union Station in the early 20th century

The Washington Terminal Company (reporting mark WATC) is a corporation created in Washington, D.C., United States, to provide support to railroads using Washington's Union Station. It is now a nearly wholly owned subsidiary of Amtrak.

It was established in 1901 by the Baltimore and Ohio Railroad and the Pennsylvania Railroad-controlled Philadelphia, Baltimore and Washington Railroad.

The Washington Terminal Company owned and operated Union Station (opened in 1907) and about 5 miles (8.0 km) of track in the Washington area, providing switching services for passenger trains using the station or passing through the area:

- Baltimore and Ohio Railroad (B&O)
- Pennsylvania Railroad (PRR)
- Chesapeake and Ohio Railway (C&O)
- Richmond, Fredericksburg and Potomac Railroad (RF&P)
- Southern Railway (SOU)
- Atlantic Coast Line Railroad (ACL)
- Seaboard Air Line Railroad (SAL)

== History ==
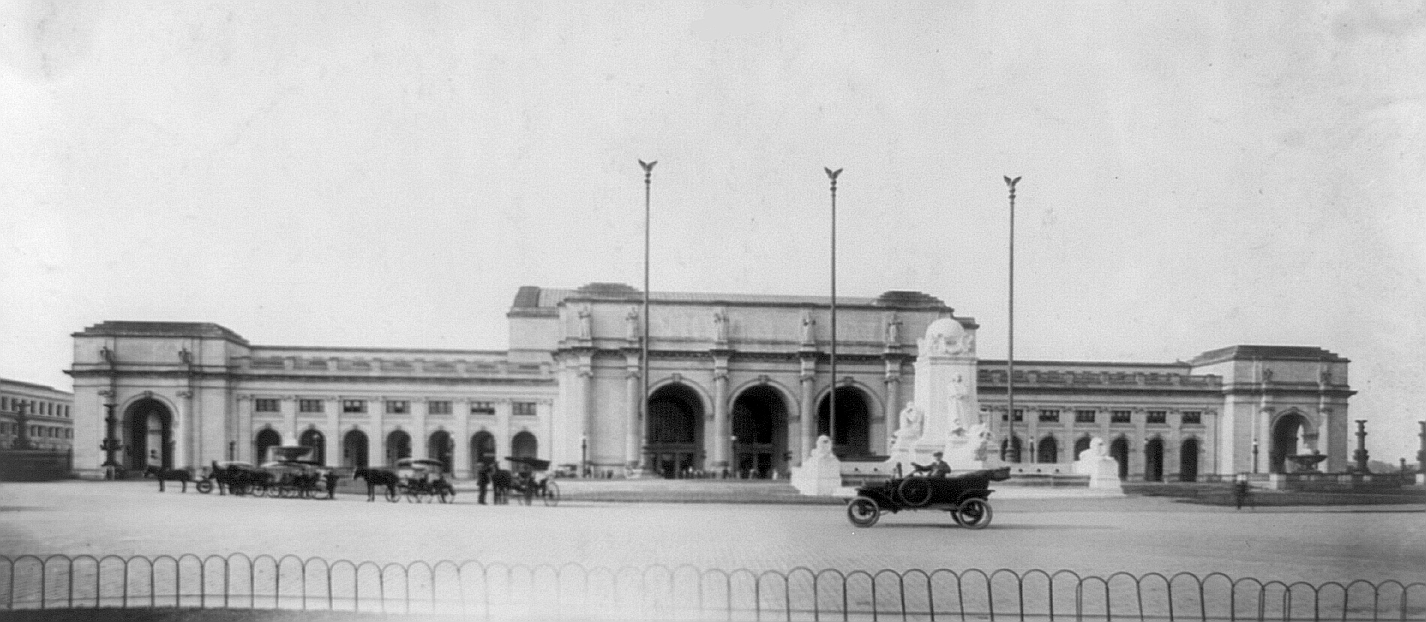
Union Station in the early 20th century

In 1914, the company was the defendant in a landmark Supreme Court of the United States case, Richards v. Washington Terminal Company.

In 1981, Amtrak took over the terminal company's operations. It currently owns a 99.7% interest in WTC, with the balance held by Amtrak employees. All of WTC's officers are Amtrak employees, as are most of its directors. Through WTC, Amtrak presently shares ownership of Union Station with the United States Department of Transportation. While the DOT owns the station building itself and the surrounding parking lots, WTC owns the platforms and tracks.

Despite being nearly wholly owned by Amtrak, the Washington Terminal Company is legally a separate entity, and unlike Amtrak, it is not exempt from the Interstate Commerce Act. This allowed Virginia Railway Express to threaten a filing to the Surface Transportation Board to enforce its right to access when Amtrak tried to oust VRE from Union Station after VRE said they would not automatically re-hire Amtrak as its operating contractor. Faced with this action, Amtrak backed down.

== Locomotive roster ==
Model	Road number
ALCO RS-1	40
ALCO RS-1	41-43
ALCO RS-1	44, 45
ALCO RS-1	46-49
ALCO RS-1	50-54
ALCO RS-1	55
ALCO RS-1	56-59
ALCO RS-1	60-61
ALCO RS-1	63,64
FAUR LDH125	78
EMD GP7	80,81
EMD SW1	738
EMD SW1200m	794

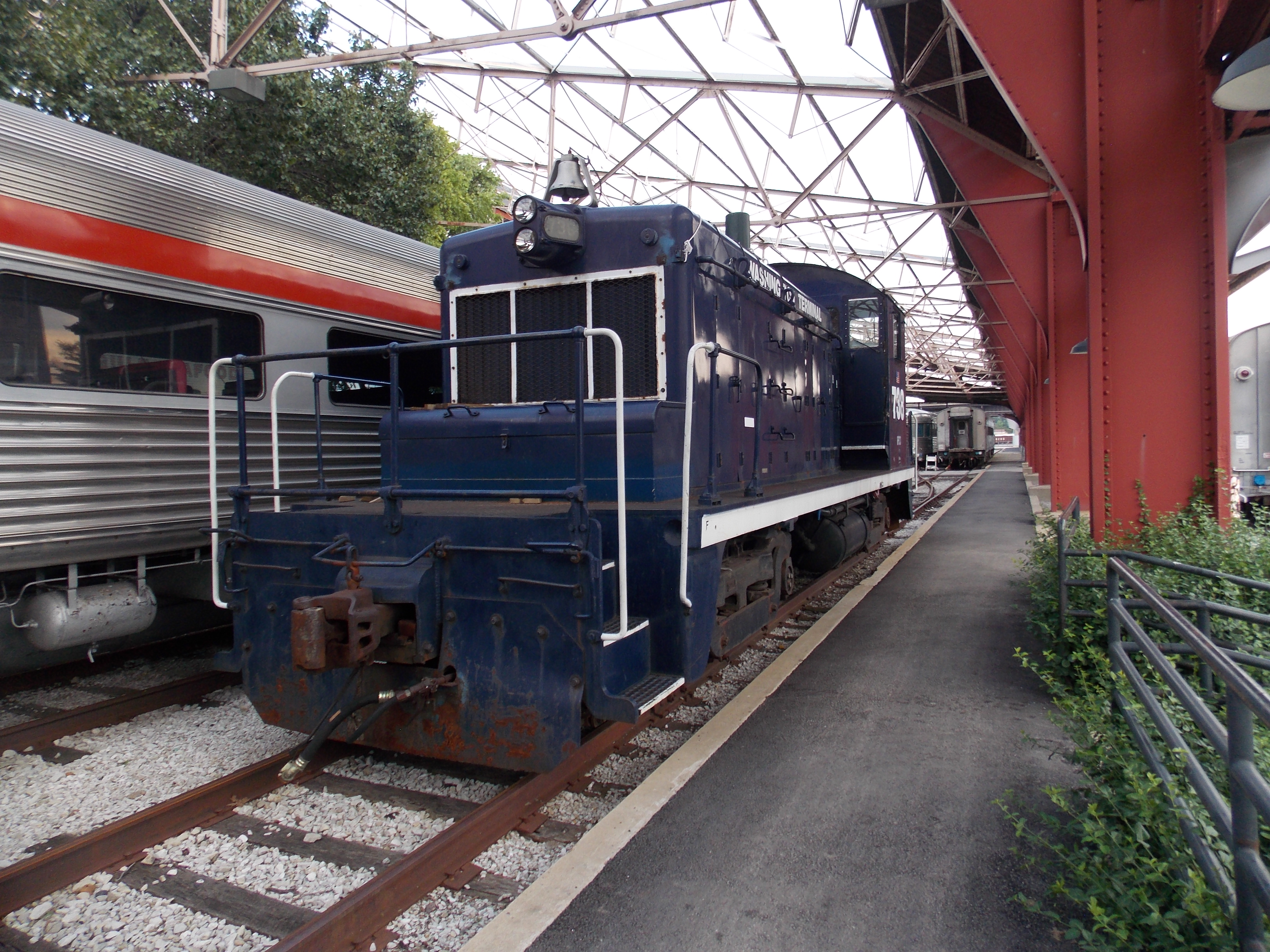
Washington Terminal EMD SW1 Locomotive #738. in July 2015.

One of the rare locomotives used by the WATC in the past was a FAUR road switcher made in the Socialist Republic of Romania in 1974. This example was made with the specific purpose of testing it on the American railroad network, at a time when diplomatic relations between the Eastern Bloc country and the United States were at an all-time high. The unit, originally numbered LDH125-107 and nicknamed "Quarterhorse" was tested across the country, but was turned down due to the lack of interest in diesel-hydraulic traction. The locomotive was then purchased by the WATC and operated into the late 1980s, until it was scrapped.

== See also ==
- First Street Tunnel
- List of railroads in Washington, D.C.
