= Bladensburg Road Bridge =

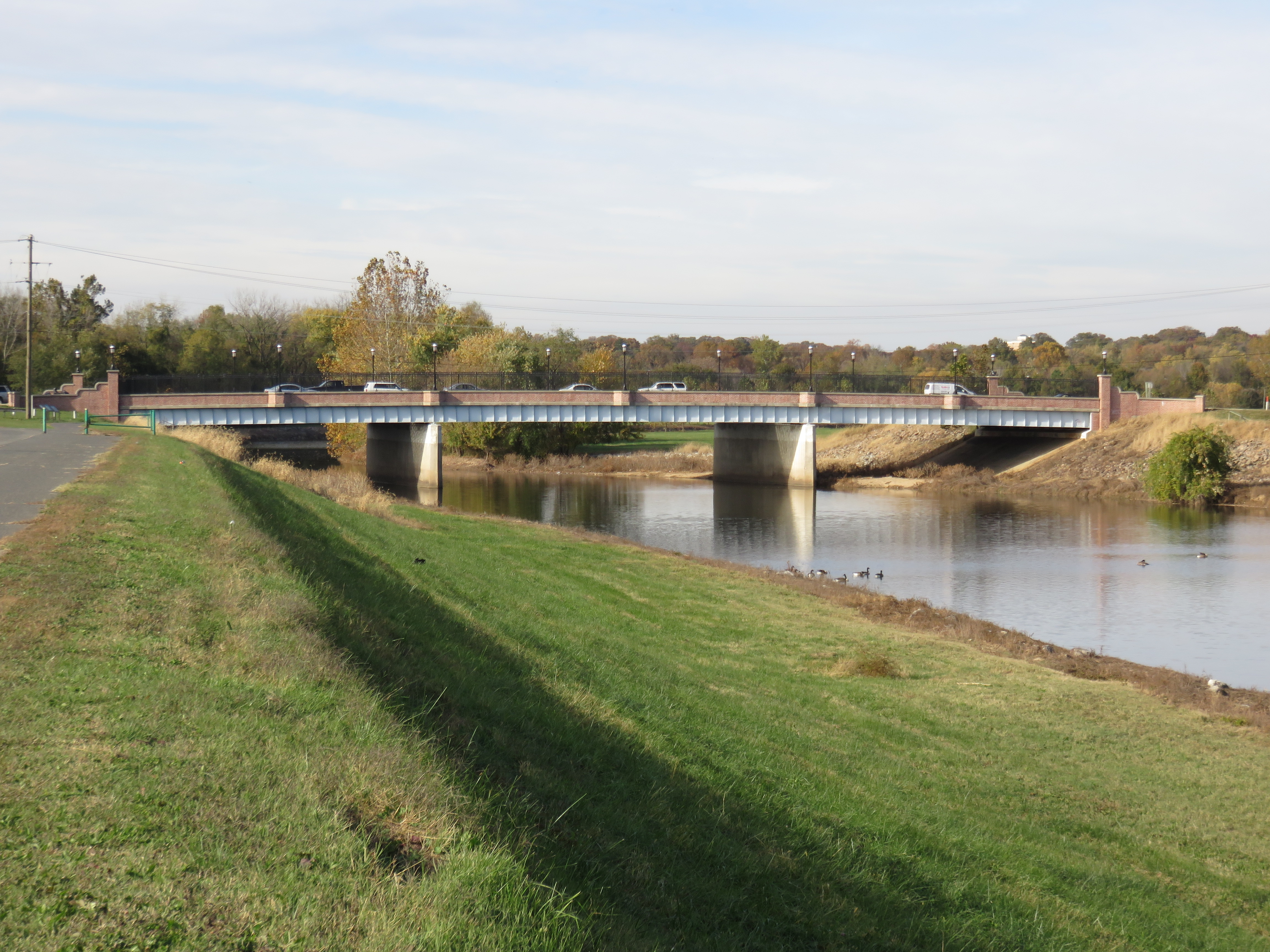
- Coordinates: 38°56′19″N 76°56′35″W
- Carries: US 1 Alt. (Bladensburg Road)
- Crosses: Anacostia River
- Locale: Colmar Manor, Maryland
- Named for: Bladensburg Road

Location
- Interactive map of Bladensburg Road Bridge

Bladensburg Road Bridge is a bridge that carries U.S. Route 1 Alternate over the Anacostia River between the communities of Colmar Manor and Bladensburg in the U.S. state of Maryland. It was built in 1955. Its span in 104 feet and has a total length of 274.9 feet.

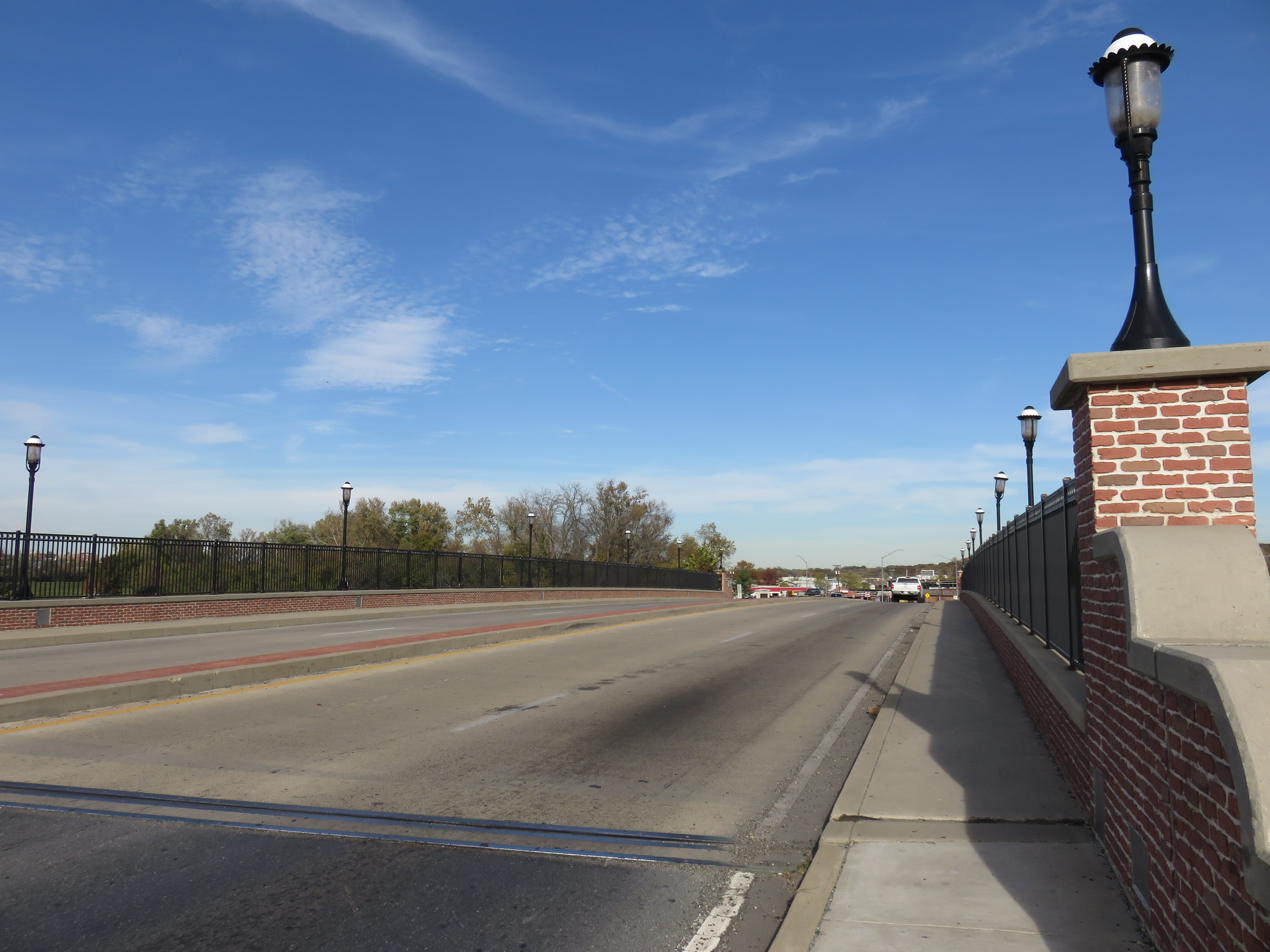
Deck of the Bladensburg Road Bridge
