= Bladensburg Park Pedestrian Bridge =

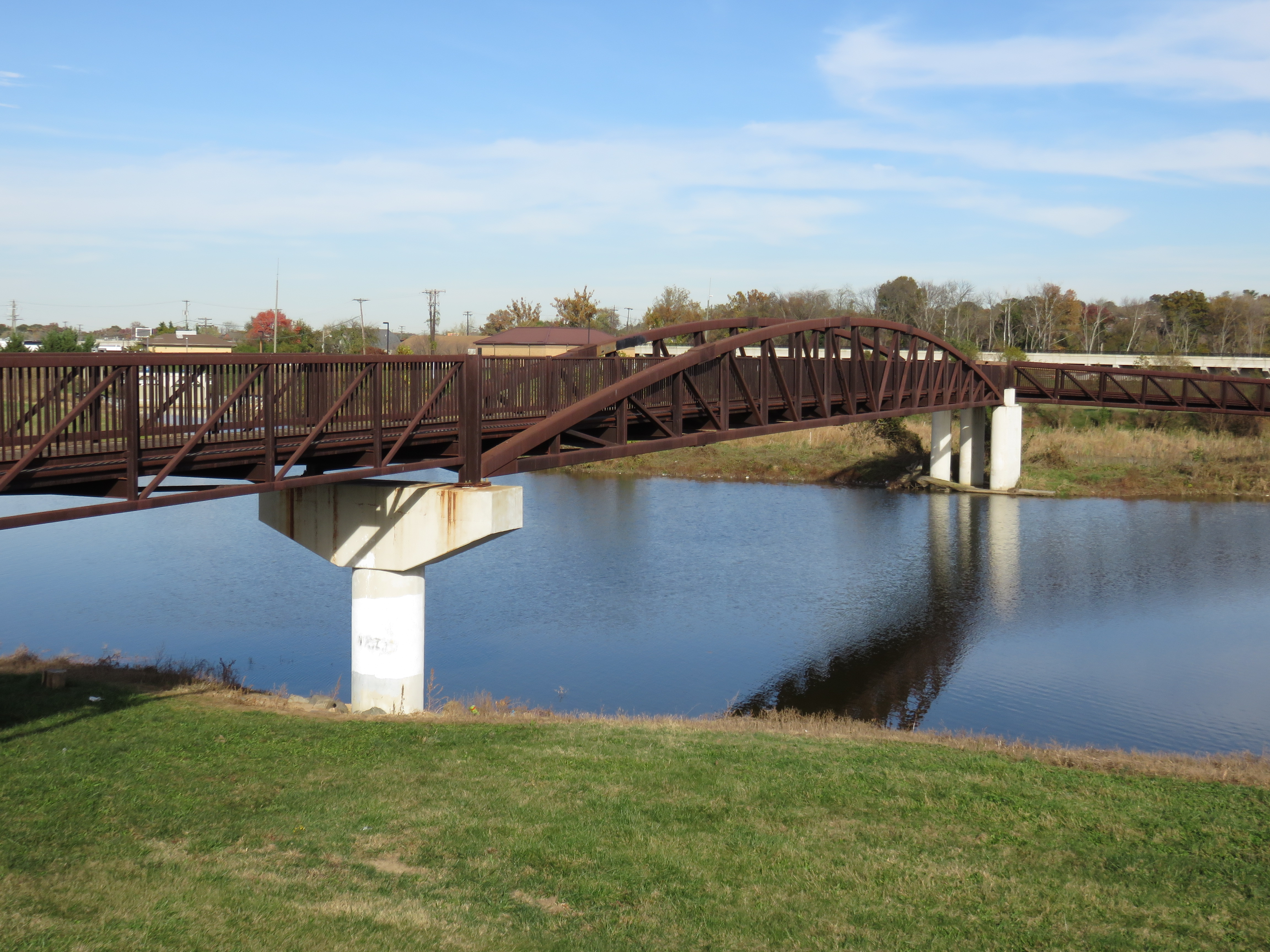
- Bladensburg Park Pedestrian Bridge in 2016
- Coordinates: 38.936613°N 76.940941°W
- Carries: Bicycles and pedestrians
- Crosses: Anacostia River
- Locale: Bladensburg, Maryland

Characteristics
- Design: Bowstring truss

History
- Opened: 2005

Location
- Interactive map of Bladensburg Park Pedestrian Bridge

Bladensburg Park Pedestrian Bridge is a bicycle and pedestrian bridge over the Anacostia River in the U.S. state of Maryland. The bridge lies between the communities of Colmar Manor and Bladensburg. The bridge was completed in 2005 using a bowstring truss design. The bridge closed for one month for renovations in January and February 2025.
