= Alexandria Extension =

Railway line in Washington D.C. and Maryland

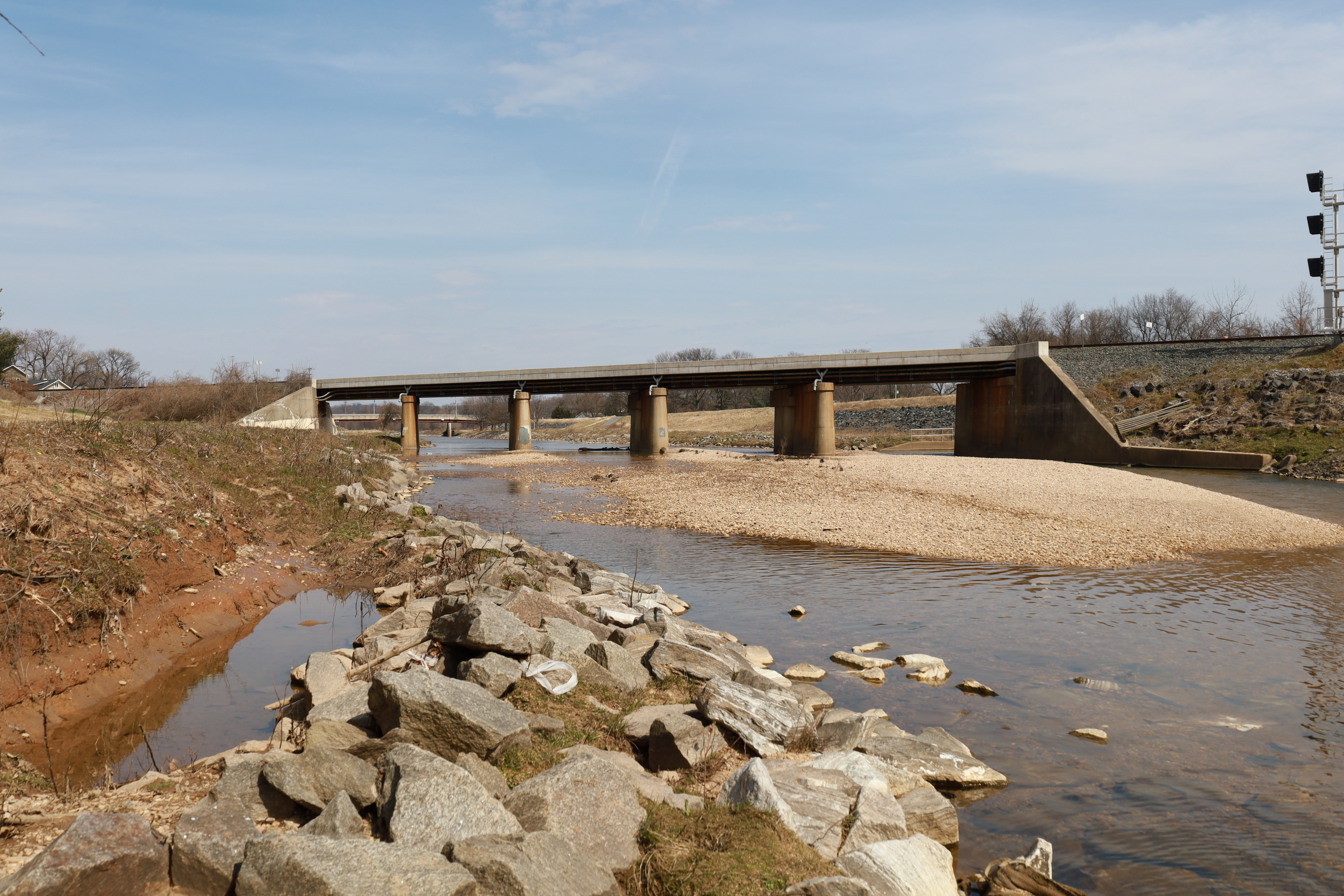
The Alexandria Extension crossing the Northeast Branch Anacostia River near the line's northern terminus

The Alexandria Extension is a short rail line in Washington, D.C. and Prince George's County, Maryland. Its northern portion connects the Capital Subdivision to the RF&P Subdivision, allowing freight trains to avoid Downtown Washington. Its southern portion, the Shepherd Industrial Spur (aka Shepherd Branch), extends south to Shepherds Landing, directly across the Potomac River from Alexandria, Virginia; service on this portion ended in 2001.

It is currently part of CSX Transportation's Capital Subdivision.

== Route description ==
The Alexandria Extension runs south 7.2 miles (11.6 km) from a junction in Hyattsville, Maryland to the beginning of the RF&P Subdivision just before the Anacostia Railroad Bridge in Southeast D.C. This busy route is used by freight trains to Virginia. This portion runs parallel to Benning Yard, the Landover Subdivision, the Washington Metro Orange Line, and the Anacostia Freeway for roughly the southern half of its length.

Its southern portion, the Shepherd Industrial Spur, continues running alongside the Anacostia Freeway until it reaches Joint Base Anacostia–Bolling. It then travels within the grounds of the Base, the U.S. Naval Research Laboratory, and the Blue Plains Advanced Wastewater Treatment Plant. Tracks have been removed along some portions of this route.

== History ==
In 1870, the B&O railroad had its exclusive access to the Long Bridge handed to the Pennsylvania Railroad (PRR) and began searching for a way to regain north-south access across the Potomac. The opportunity came from the Washington City and Point Lookout Railroad (WCPL) which was chartered in 1872 and authorized to run trains between Washington, D.C., and Point Lookout with connecting steamers to Norfolk, Virginia.

In 1873-1874, the B&O had the WC&PL lay 12.5 miles (20.1 km) of track from Hyattsville, Maryland to Shepherd's Point directly across from Alexandria, where the B&O set up a car float operation at Shepherds Landing. The float carried freight cars across the river to Alexandria, Virginia. This became the Baltimore, Washington and Alexandria Branch, known colloquially as the Alexandria Branch of the WC&PL. In 1874, the line was sold to the B&O. Today, CSX calls the line the Alexandria Extension, although it's also sometimes called the Shepherd Branch.

For many years the junction at Hyattsville, called Alexandria Junction, was controlled by JD Tower. B&O built its first interlocking tower building at the site in 1894, and rebuilt the tower in 1912 and again in 1917. CSX closed this tower in 1992, and demolished it in 1994 after a fire.

The ferry operation was discontinued in 1906 when the B&O obtained trackage rights from PRR. The B&O built a connecting track from the Alexandria Extension to the B&P's Anacostia Railroad Bridge, which provided access to PRR tracks in southwest D.C. (now called the CSX RF&P Subdivision) and the Long Bridge.

During World War II, the B&O re-activated the Shepherds Landing crossing at the request of the U.S. Army. The Army had requested an additional Potomac River crossing for troop movements to supplement those on the Long Bridge, and the Corps of Engineers built a temporary bridge across the river in 1942. Both B&O and PRR trains traveled over the 3,360 foot (1,020 m) bridge. Train operations on the bridge ceased in 1945 at the end of the war, and the bridge was demolished in 1947.

The original track from the junction at Anacostia Bridge to Shepherds Landing became known as the Shepherd Branch. This spur served several industries, including Bolling Air Force Base and the Blue Plains Advanced Wastewater Treatment Plant. (Shown as "Shepherd Industrial Track" on the diagram.) The Blue Plains plant was the only customer on the branch when rail service ended in 2001.

Plans were made to reuse the track as part of the Anacostia Line of the DC Streetcar, but this did not occur.
