= Richards v. Washington Terminal Co =

Richards v. Washington Terminal Company
- Supreme Court of the United States

Argued November 7, 1913 Decided May 4, 1914
- Full case name: Webster Richards v. Washington Terminal Company
- Citations: 233 U.S. 546 (more) Richards v. Washington Terminal Co., 233 U.S. 546 (1914)

Holding
- Any diminution of the value of property not directly invaded nor peculiarly affected, but sharing in the common burden of incidental damages arising from a legalized nuisance, is not a taking.

Court membership
- Chief Justice Edward D. White Associate Justices Joseph McKenna · Oliver W. Holmes Jr. William R. Day · Horace H. Lurton; Charles E. Hughes · Willis Van Devanter; Joseph R. Lamar · Mahlon Pitney

Case opinions
- Majority: Pitney
- Dissent: Lurton

Laws applied
- Takings Clause of the Fifth Amendment to the United States Constitution

Richards v. Washington Terminal Company, 233 U.S. 546 (1914), was a case decided by the Supreme Court of the United States resolving the question when a government-created nuisance amounted to a taking of property under the Fifth Amendment's Takings Clause of the United States Constitution.

== Facts and holding ==
In Richards, the Court in a 8–1 decision, held that any diminution of the value of property not directly invaded nor peculiarly affected by a government-created nuisance, but instead sharing in the common burden of incidental damages arising from the legalized nuisance, is not a taking under the U.S. Constitution.

The case involved a landowner who claimed that they were injured from the smoke, dust, cinders, and gases emitted from the defendant's railroad which abutted the landowner's property. The Court found no taking from the injuries that the plaintiff were suffered common to the public. However, because the railroad tunnel adjoining the landowner's property had a fanning system, which directed gases and dust onto the landowner's property, a taking occurred. Due to this holding, Richards is an important case addressing what legal rule should be applied when determining whether a government-created nuisance constitutes a taking under the U.S. Constitution and takings clauses in state constitutions.

== See also ==
- Hopkins v. Clemson Agricultural College
