= Anacostia Railroad Bridge =

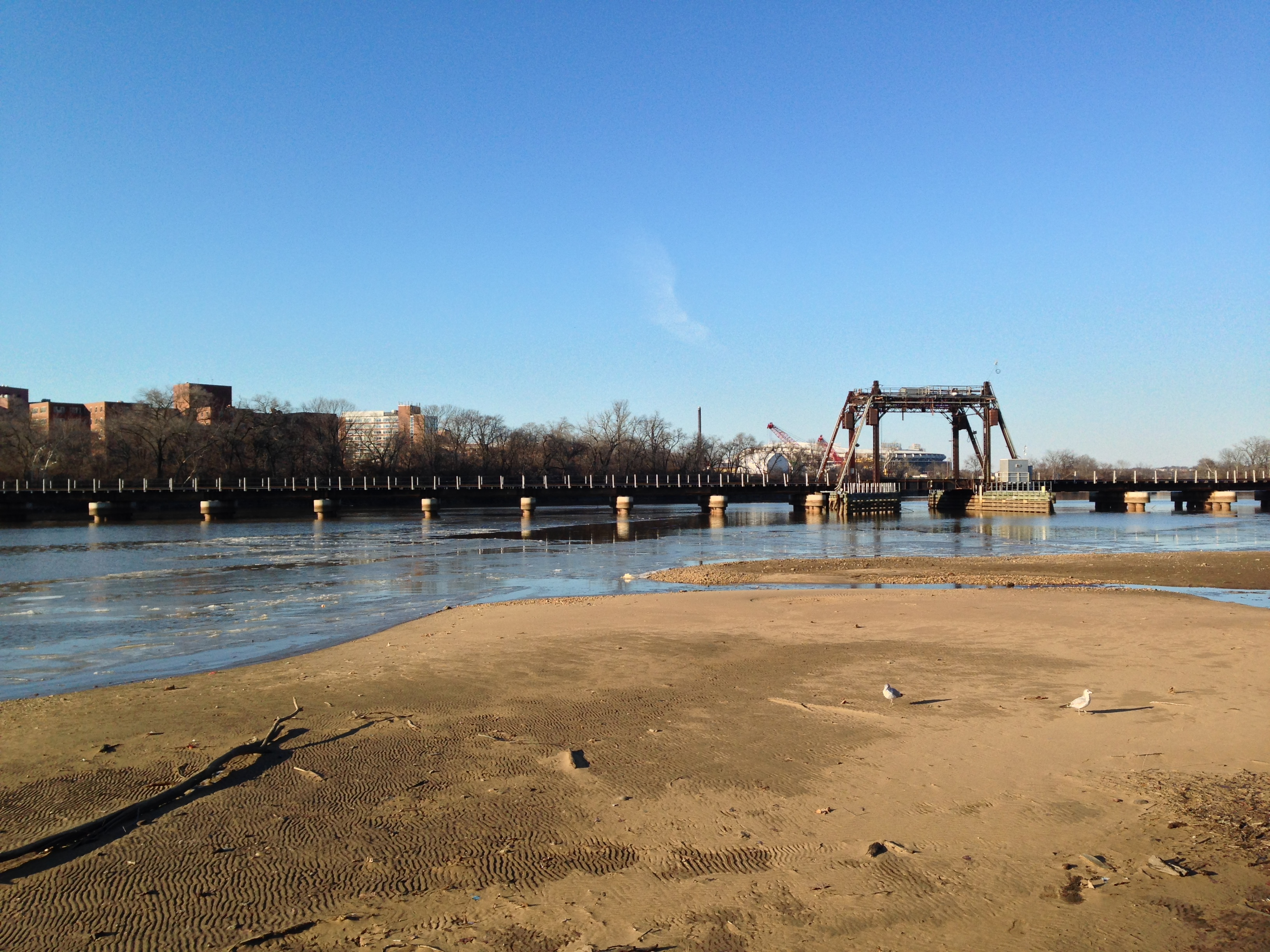
- The Anacostia Railroad Bridge from the south in 2015, with Robert F. Kennedy Memorial Stadium visible in the background
- Coordinates: 38.880076°N 76.971889°W
- Carries: Railroad
- Crosses: Anacostia River
- Locale: Washington, D.C.
- Owner: CSX Transportation

Characteristics
- Total length: approx. 910 feet (280 m)
- Width: 33 feet (10 m)
- No. of spans: 1
- Clearance below: 5 feet (1.5 m) (lift span closed), 29 feet (8.8 m) (open)

History
- Opened: 1872; rebuilt 1972

The Anacostia Railroad Bridge is a vertical lift railroad bridge crossing the Anacostia River in Washington, D.C., United States. The bridge is owned by CSX Transportation.

== History ==
The Baltimore and Potomac Rail Road, a subsidiary of the Pennsylvania Railroad, built the first railroad bridge on this site, which opened on July 2, 1872. Successor Penn Central Railroad rebuilt the bridge in 1972.

The bridge currently carries freight trains. It is near the point where the RF&P Subdivision becomes the Landover Subdivision, with a connection to the Alexandria Extension just to the east of the bridge. Originally the bridge supported three tracks. This was later reduced to two tracks.

== Operations ==
The lift span is occasionally raised for boat traffic. The lift is controlled by a CSX bridge tender located nearby at Benning Rail Yard.

== Incidents ==
On November 10, 2007, a unit train carrying coal derailed and caused the collapse of the northern span of the bridge.

CSX had briefly closed the bridge in 2006 after it found high levels of corrosion and made repairs, and after the 2007 accident it again closed the bridge. The southern span was reopened 24 hours after the accident.

== See also ==
- Amtrak Railroad Anacostia Bridge
- Landover Subdivision
