= Landover Subdivision =

Railway line in District of Columbia and Maryland

Overview
- Status: Operational
- Owner: CSX Transportation
- Locale: Washington metropolitan area
- Termini: Northeast Corridor; RF&P Subdivision

Service
- System: CSX Transportation

Technical
- Line length: 5.7 miles (9.2 km)
- Number of tracks: 2
- Character: At-grade
- Track gauge: 4 ft 8 1/2 in (1,435 mm) standard gauge
- Operating speed: 50 miles per hour (80 km/h)

The Landover Subdivision is a railroad line owned and operated by CSX Transportation. It runs from the Anacostia section of Washington, D.C., to Landover, Maryland, serving as a freight train bypass of Washington Union Station.

At the Landover end, the line connects to the Amtrak Northeast Corridor (NEC). CSX operates freight trains on an 8.3 miles (13.4 km) section of the NEC between Landover and its Popes Creek Subdivision. At two points along the Landover Subdivision there are connections to the Alexandria Extension, part of the Capital Subdivision. The Capital Subdivision supports freight trains headed northward to Baltimore, and southward to a connection with the Metropolitan Subdivision, for points west of Washington. The southern end of the Landover Subdivision connects to the RF&P Subdivision, which carries freight trains southward across the Long Bridge into Virginia.

== History ==
The Landover Subdivision was built c. 1870 by the Baltimore and Potomac Railroad (B&P), which was controlled by the Pennsylvania Railroad (PRR). This was part of the B&P's Washington City Branch, the railroad's initial route from Baltimore to Washington. At that time the branch included the Anacostia Railroad Bridge and the Virginia Avenue Tunnel, and the route continued past the tunnel to the B&P passenger station at Sixth Street and B Street NW and the Long Bridge.

The Magruder Branch, a new route into Washington for passenger trains, was built c. 1907 from Landover westward to the new Union Station, and the old B&P station was demolished. (The Magruder Branch is now part of the NEC.) Subsequently, the PRR used the old route only for freight trains and called this the "Landover to South End" section in its Maryland Division.

The PRR installed catenary lines during the 1930s to support use of electric locomotives. Conrail, the successor company to the PRR, removed the electric lines c. 1982. CSX acquired the Landover Subdivision following the breakup of Conrail in 1999.

== See also ==
- List of CSX Transportation lines
