= Anacostia Riverwalk Trail =

Trail system in Washington, D.C.

Coordinates: 39.0024°N 77.0463°W

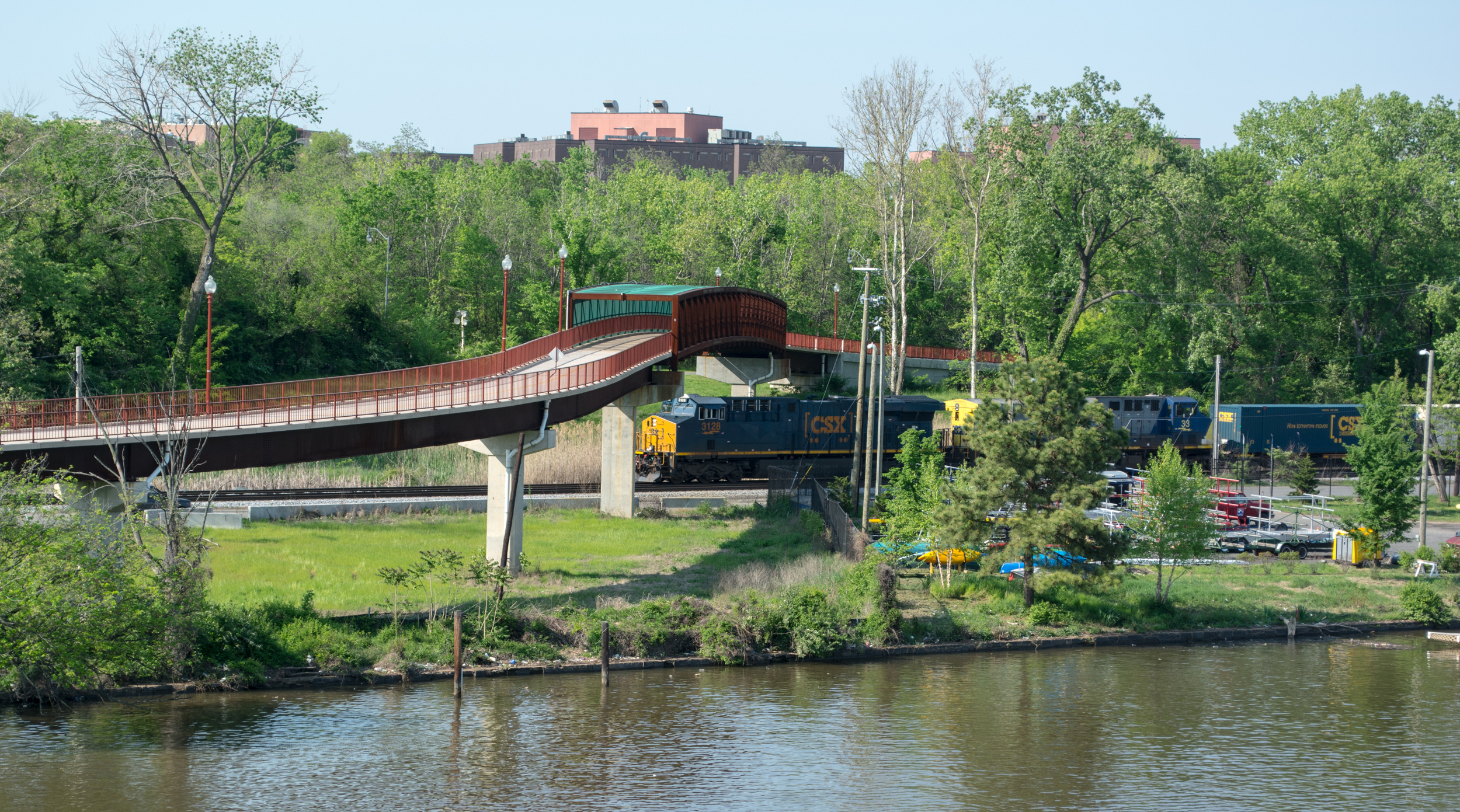
- A train passing beneath a bridge on the Anacostia Riverwalk Trail.
- Length: 16.5 miles (26.6 km)
- Location: Anacostia River (Washington, D.C.)
- Established: 2004
- Use: Hiking, biking
- Surface: Asphalt and brick
- Website: nps.gov

The Anacostia Riverwalk Trail is a trail system spanning the Anacostia River in Washington, D.C. On the north end it connects to the Anacostia Tributary Trail System; on the south end it connects to the Oxon Hill Farm Trail, and on the west it connects to the Rock Creek Park trail.

== History ==
The Anacostia Riverwalk Trail was first proposed as a 20-mile system of trails in the 2003 Anacostia Waterfront Initiative (AWI) Framework Plan, though similar proposals for such trails had been considered for decades. For example the National Capital Planning Commission's 1997 Extending the Legacy plan proposed an 11-mile "Washington Water Walk" from Georgetown to the National Arboretum and the 1966 federal "Trails for America" report identified a 25-mile trail along the Anacostia as a good candidate for a Washington, DC area trail system. The AWI plan called for building trails on the east side of the Anacostia from the Maryland boundary to the Frederick Douglass Memorial Bridge, on the west side from the Benning Road Bridge to Fort McNair and along the Southwest Waterfront from Buzzard Point to the Tidal Basin. The AWI plan called it the Anacostia Riverwalk and Trail.

Over the next three years, the District government proceeded to study and design the trail system. During that time it was renamed, with the "and" dropped. They identified 19 different trail segments 16 miles in total length, or 25 miles with expanded elements. The system proposed after design was expanded to include segments south to Blue Plains, north to the Capitol and the Tidal Basin, and with a bridge across the Anacostia at the National Arboretum. The design took advantage of several existing pieces of multi-use facilities including the 0.6-mile River Terrace section (repaved and modified in 2003 when the new Ethel Kennedy Bridge was constructed) and a 0.3-mile trail connection to Heritage Island, both built for the bicentennial; the half-mile Navy Yard Promenade built after 1991; a 0.2-mile trail through Southwest Waterfront Park, built in 1968; a 0.2-mile connection over 295 to the Anacostia Recreation Center, originally opened in 1964 and rebuilt in 2009-2010; and 2.7 miles of bicycle/pedestrian facilities on the Sousa (built in 1941, and modified for better bicycle and pedestrian access in 1995), Francis Case (built in 1971, with a causeway built by 1993 and modified in 2018) and Ethel Kennedy (built in 2004) Bridges. However, the Navy Yard Promenade didn't open to the public until April 1, 2011, after the Navy built a fence between it and the facility. Altogether 4.5 miles of trail and facilities existed prior to production of the AWI plan.

In 2003, the District Department of Transportation defined and signed an interim trail that utilized on-street routes, a few existing sections of trail and some demonstration trails located next to the Earth Conservation Corps's Mathew Henson Center at Half Street, SW and their Pumphouse facility along First Street, SE; and another along Water Street where the Anacostia Community Boathouse used to be. At that time they also repaved a temporary trail from Anacostia Drive to the Douglass Bridge's sidewalks and on to Bolling Air Force Base.

Since the initial groundbreaking in 2007, another 13 miles of trail has been completed and over two miles is under construction as of 2020.

In 2014, the section that passes beneath the 11th Street Bridge on the north side of the river was closed to allow Washington Gas to clean up contaminants related to the former Washington Gas East Station manufactured gas plant property which was just north of the site. Once it was cleaned up the area was seeded with native species and the closure remained in place to allow the vegetation to become established. It was to take only two years, but took six instead and the area wasn't reopened until February 2021.

Section Name	Description	Groundbreaking	Ribbon-Cutting	Length(mi)
RFK	Benning Road to 11th Street, SE with a gap at the railroad tracks	May 7, 2007	Apr. 2008	2.3
Diamond Teague Park	DC Water Pumphouse to 1st Street, SE	Feb. 13, 2009	Apr. 27, 2010	0.1
Yards Park	Navy Yard Promenade to DC Water Pumphouse	May 28, 2009	Sep. 11, 2010	0.3
Fiber Reinforced Polymer (FRP) Bridges - Phase I	East Capitol St. to the railroad tracks - east side	2009	Nov. 2009	0.6
11th Street Bridge	O St, SE to Good Hope Road, SE; and Navy Yard to 12th St, SE	Dec. 29, 2009	Sep 7, 2013	0.5
East Bank (Anacostia Park & Poplar Point)	Roller Skating Pavilion to South Capitol St. - east side	2010	Fall, 2011	2.2
FRP Bridges - Phase II - West Side	Bridge from Southeast Boulevard to M Street, SE	2010	Apr. 24, 2012	0.3
Pumphouse Pier	Yards Park to Diamond Teague Park	March 2011	Nov. 22, 2011	0.1
FRP Bridges - Phase III - East Side	North side of Railroad tracks to Roller Skating Pavilion	Spring 2011	Apr. 19, 2013	0.4
SW Waterfront - Maine Avenue	I-395 NB and NB 14th Street Bridge ramp	Jul. 25, 2011	March 2012	0.3
SW Waterfront - The Wharf Phase I	7th Street, SW to I-395 NB	Mar. 19, 2014	Oct. 12, 2017	0.4
Kenilworth Gardens	Anacostia River Park in Hyattsville to Benning Road	Apr. 24, 2014	Oct. 31, 2016	3.8
Florida Rock - Dock 79	First St. SE to Half St. SE	Dec. 9, 2014	August, 2016	0.1
Mall Connectors - Virginia Ave	9th Street, SE to 2nd Street, SE	May 11, 2015	Jan. 10, 2019	0.6
Mall Connectors - Virginia Ave	Virginia Ave Park, 11th Street, SE to 9th Street, SE	May 11, 2015	December, 2019	0.1
SW Waterfront - Norton Plaza	N Street, SW to 6th Street, SW	Fall 2015	June 1, 2017	0.1
Douglass Bridge	Underneath bridge on both sides, with connections to bridge and across it.	Feb. 13, 2018	Sept. 12, 2021 - span; Oct 2022 - underneath east side	2.0
Florida Rock - The Maren	Dock 79 to Phase IV	March 2018	June 2020	0.03
Buzzard Point - 2nd Street SW Cycletrack	V Street, SW to P Street, SW	May 2018	October 2018	0.5
Buzzard Point - River Point	2nd Street SW to Buzzard Point Park	July 2018	October 2020	0.06
SW Waterfront - The Wharf Phase II	7th Street, SW to Water Street, SW	July 25, 2018	September 19, 2022	0.2
Buzzard Point - The Watermark	T Street SW to Half Street SW	September 2018	December 10, 2020	0.1
Whitney Young Memorial Bridge Connection	Young Bridge southside pedestrian path to the trail	August 20, 2019	September 23, 2019	0.1
P Street SW	2nd Street SW to 4th Street SW	November 25, 2019	December 9, 2019	0.2

== Description ==
Because the Riverwalk was built bit by bit, designed and constructed at different times by different organizations, the trail is a varying combination of trails and trail segments. At times it is a paved multi-use trail, an on-road route, a sidewalk, a protected bike lane or a riverfront promenade. Its surface is mostly asphalt, but at times concrete, brick or boardwalk is used.

On the north end, the trail starts at the southern terminus of the Anacostia Tributary Trail System in Prince George's County just north of the New York Avenue/US-50 Bridge and follows the river south through Kenilworth Park and Aquatic Gardens to the intersection of 40th St. NE and Anacostia Avenue, NE. It then travels over Watts Branch and through the Mayfair neighborhood on road to the intersection of Anacostia Drive, NE and Foote St. NE. There it enters the south portion of Kenilworth Park on an old park service access road where it connects to a multi-use trail between the river and the old PEPCO power plant. It follows this trail to Benning Road where the trail splits to both sides of the river.

On the east side, the trail continues along the river through River Terrace Park, under East Capitol Street, over the railroad tracks and into the main part of Anacostia National Park. In ANP it travels all the way to Poplar Point between the river and Anacostia Drive, SE. At Popular Point it begins to run along the east side of South Capitol Street, connecting to both sides of the Douglass Bridge, before ending at Defense Boulevard and the gate to Joint Base Anacostia Bolling.

On the west side, the trail travels along the river to Douglass Bridge and then across Southwest DC to the Washington Channel, where it turns north. South of Benning Road, it travels along the river on the east side of the RFK Stadium campus and Congressional Cemetery. It crosses over the railroad tracks, with a separate connection to Barney Circle, and then uses a sidewalk, sections of trail and Water Street, SE to traverse Boathouse Row. After crossing under the 11th Street Bridge, it connects, in order, to the Navy Yard Promenade, Yards Park and Diamond Teague Park. Someday it will connect from there to the Douglass Bridge and Buzzard Point before turning north, but for now, it detours on road on Potomac Avenue, First Street, SW and P Street, SW to Southwest Waterfront Park. From there it turns north along the Washington Channel using the trail in Southwest Waterfront Park, sidewalks and sidepaths along Maine Avenue and the trail in front of the Wharf to its terminus at Ohio Drive and the trails around the Tidal Basin.

In the future, the trail will connect via two routes to the Capitol, via the South Capital Street Trail to Oxon Cove Park and via a new trail segment in Kenilworth Gardens and a bridge over the Anacostia to the National Arboretum. In 2018, it was branded as part of a larger Anacostia River Trail Network that included the Marvin Gaye Trail, the Suitland Parkway Trail and its extension, the proposed Shepherd's Branch Trail, the proposed Lincoln Connector Trail, the 11th Street Bridge Park, the Oxon Run Trail, and the Pennsylvania Avenue Trail.

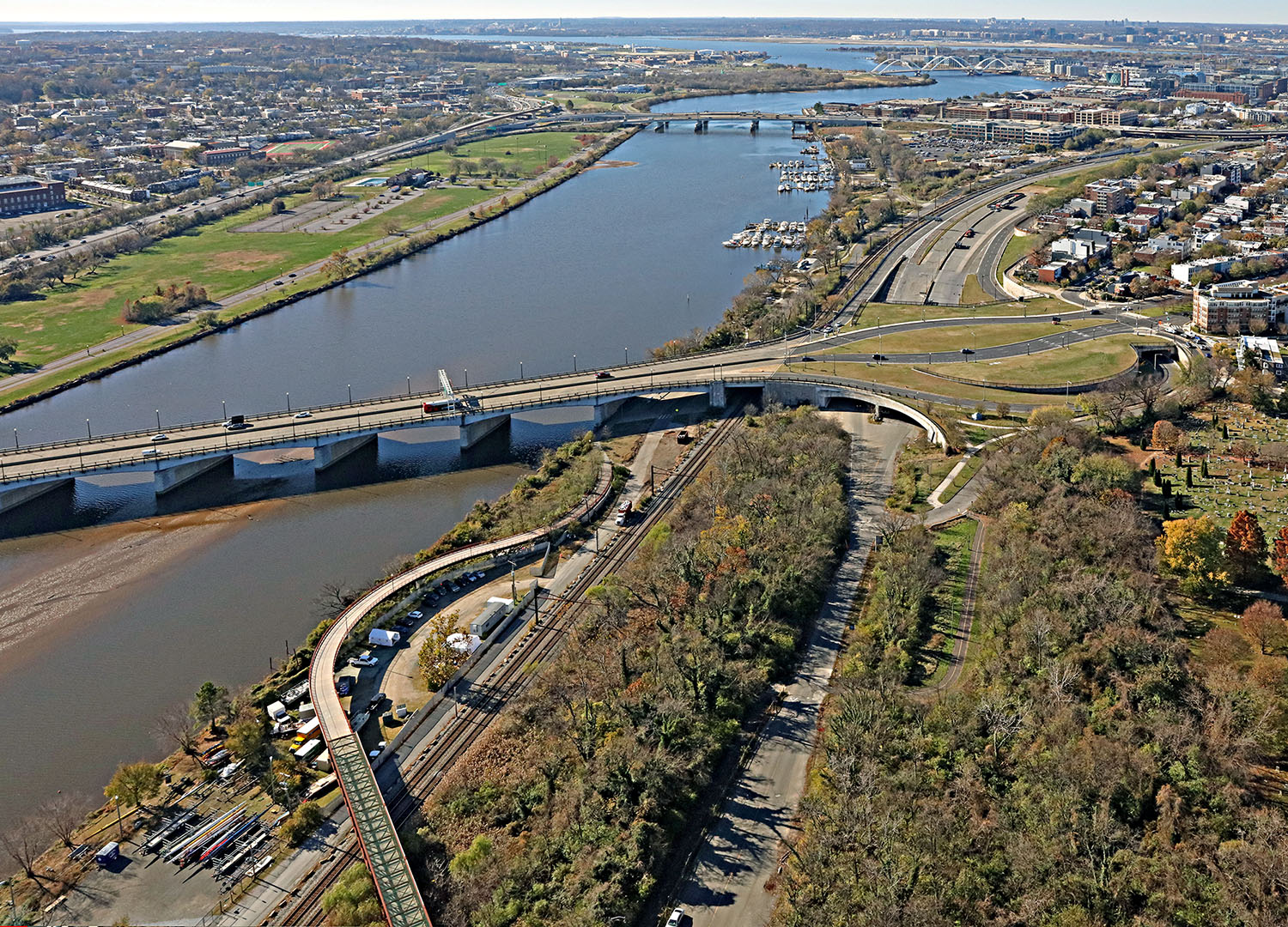
Anacostia Riverwalk Trail; Aerial photo, looking Southwest

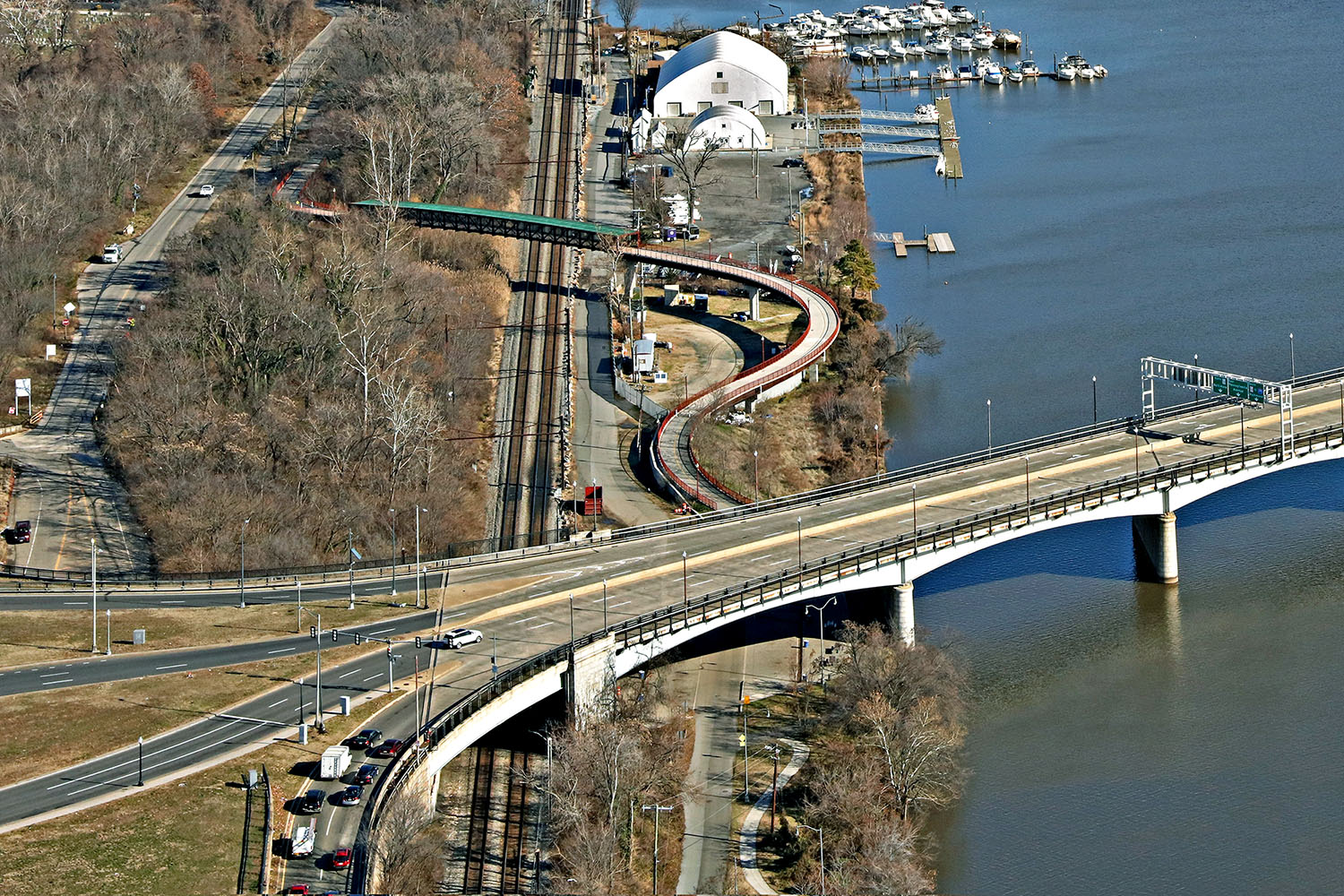
Anacostia Riverwalk Trail; Aerial photo, looking North

== See also ==
- Metropolitan Branch Trail
