= John Philip Sousa Bridge =

Bridge in Washington, D.C., United States

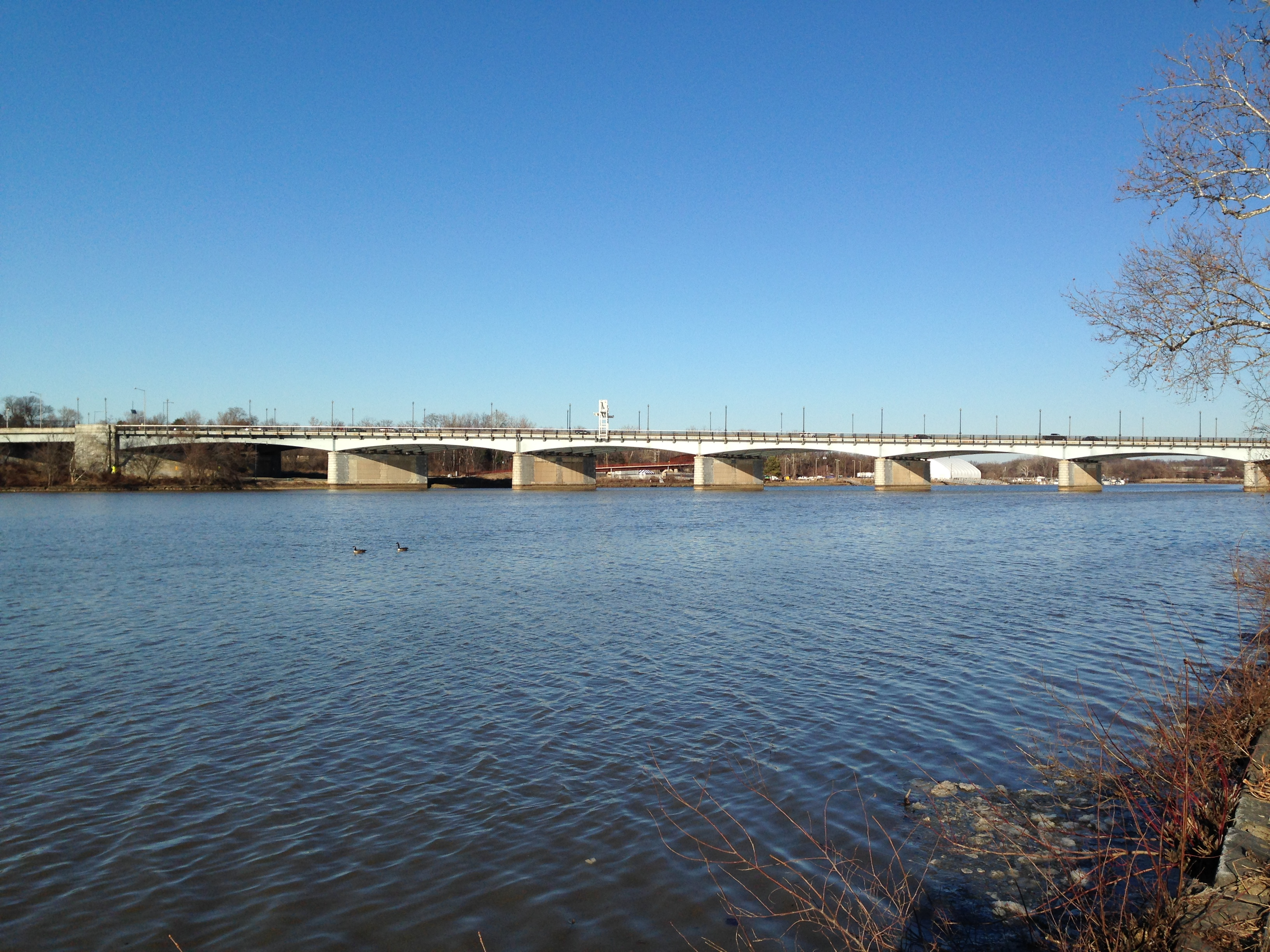
- The Sousa Bridge from the south in 2015
- Coordinates: 38.8769°N 76.9779°W
- Carries: Six (6) lanes of Pennsylvania Avenue SE, plus two sidewalks
- Crosses: Anacostia River
- Owner: Washington, D.C., U.S.
- Maintained by: District of Columbia Department of Transportation
- Followed by: The Pennsylvania Avenue Bridge

Characteristics
- Design: Continuous steel plate girder bridge
- Material: Reinforced concrete, steel, masonry
- Total length: 1,666 feet (508 m)
- Width: 72 feet (22 m) (1941–1994); 91 feet (28 m) (1994–today)

History
- Architect: U.S. Army Corps of Engineers
- Engineering design by: U.S. Army Corps of Engineers
- Constructed by: Penker Construction
- Construction start: August 1938
- Construction end: January 18, 1941
- Construction cost: $2 million
- Opened: December 9, 1939

Statistics
- Toll: none

Location
- Interactive map of John Philip Sousa Bridge

The John Philip Sousa Bridge, also known as the Sousa Bridge and the Pennsylvania Avenue Bridge, is a continuous steel plate girder bridge that carries Pennsylvania Avenue SE across the Anacostia River in Washington, D.C., in the United States. The bridge is named for famous United States Marine Band conductor and composer John Philip Sousa, who grew up near the bridge's northwestern terminus.

The first bridge at this location was constructed in 1804, but burned by United States armed forces in 1814 during the War of 1812. It was replaced in 1815, but the bridge burned to the waterline in 1846. The rapid growth of residential developments east of the Anacostia River led to the construction of a narrow, iron girder bridge in 1890. This bridge led to even swifter economic and residential development of the area. Efforts to replace the 1890 bridge with a modern structure began in 1931, but were not successful until 1938. The downstream (southern) span opened on December 9, 1939, to great fanfare. The upstream span was completed in December 1940 and opened on January 18, 1941.

The Sousa Bridge has a partial interchange with the Barney Circle traffic circle at its northwestern end, and a partial interchange with Anacostia Freeway at its southeastern terminus. A major battle over building an Inner Loop Expressway in the District of Columbia occurred in the 1950s and 1960s. This led to the partial construction of Interstate 695 from Interstate 395 to Barney Circle, but political battles over the wisdom of further construction led to cancellation of the remaining highway—leaving Barney Circle and the northern approaches to the Sousa Bridge partially deconstructed. An attempt to build the remainder of Interstate 695 (the "Barney Circle Freeway") in the 1990s also failed. In 2010, the District of Columbia decommissioned the portion of Interstate 695 leading to Barney Circle and the Sousa Bridge, and began rebuilding the circle and approaches.

== Early bridges at the site ==
The village of Georgetown in what later became the Washington, D.C. was founded in 1745. A road ran generally southeast along what is today Pennsylvania Avenue NW to Capitol Hill, and then along a slightly more southerly course than present-day Pennsylvania Avenue SE to stop at the intersection of what was then Virginia Avenue SE, M Street SE, and 14th Street SE on the shores of the Anacostia River (then known as the "Eastern Branch"). Aquila Wheeler had a ferry there which he used to take people across the river to the Upper Marlboro Turnpike (now Pennsylvania Avenue SE). This ferry was known as the Upper Ferry, distinguishing it from the Lower Ferry (which ran from Barry's Wharf near the intersection of New Jersey Avenue SE and O Street SE across the Anacosita to Poplar Point). Wheeler died in 1796, and his widow, Elizabeth, operated the ferry until she was declared insane in 1799.

=== The bridge of 1804 ===
In 1795, Daniel Carroll, William Duncanson, Thomas Law, Notley Young, George Walker, and Matthew Wigfield petitioned the Maryland General Assembly for permission to construct a bascule bridge over the Anacostia River. On December 24, 1795, the Maryland legislature adopted a bill authorizing the bridge. The Maryland act required that the bridge be constructed at the base of Kentucky Avenue SE (less than a hundred feet downstream from the terminus of the current bridge). (William Young, Elizabeth Wheeler's brother and a relative of Notley Young's, owned this land.) Its southeastern terminus was to be on land owned by Wigfield. It was authorized by law to collect tolls, although these could be no higher than the market average. A corporation, the Eastern Branch Bridge Co., was formed to build the bridge. It issued 225 shares at $200 a share, with dividends to be paid from tolls collected on the bridge. Under the terms of the legislature's bill, title to the bridge reverted to the state of Maryland after 30 years. The corporation didn't act with much urgency. It was not until March 18, 1801, that stock in the firm was sold, but even then $43,000 was quickly raised.

The 1,510-foot-long (460 m) bridge was completed and opened for traffic in January 1804. The bridge was 20 feet (6.1 m) wide and had a draw span 30 feet (9.1 m) wide. Its abutments were of stone, but its piers were wood. Construction of the bridge allowed Pennsylvania Avenue to be extended across the Anacostia River for the first time. A major flood struck the Anacostia River on July 8, 1804, and piled logs and fence posts against the bridge. It survived.

The bridge did not survive the War of 1812. The United States Army suffered an ignominious defeat in the Battle of Bladensburg on August 24, 1814, leaving the city of Washington open to the British Army. The Eastern Branch bridge was one of only three land routes into the city. Early in the afternoon, Captain John Creighton, a United States Navy officer, burned the bridge to the waterline.

=== The 1815 bridge ===
The Eastern Branch Bridge Co. sued the U.S. Navy for burning its bridge. To quiet the suit, Congress appropriated $20,000 (another source says $20,500) to pay the bridge's investors. The bridge company used some of this money to rebuild, and a wooden bascule span bridge reopened in the same spot in 1815. Now often called the Pennsylvania Avenue Bridge, it operated as a toll bridge from 1815 to 1841. It deteriorated over time, and in 1841 was closed to vehicular traffic (but remained open for foot traffic).

In 1846, a steamship attempting to go up the Anacostia became wedged in the draw span. Sparks from the ship's funnel ignited the bridge, and it burned to the water line. For many years thereafter, the pilings of the old bridge could be seen when the water level in the river was low.

=== The 1890 bridge ===
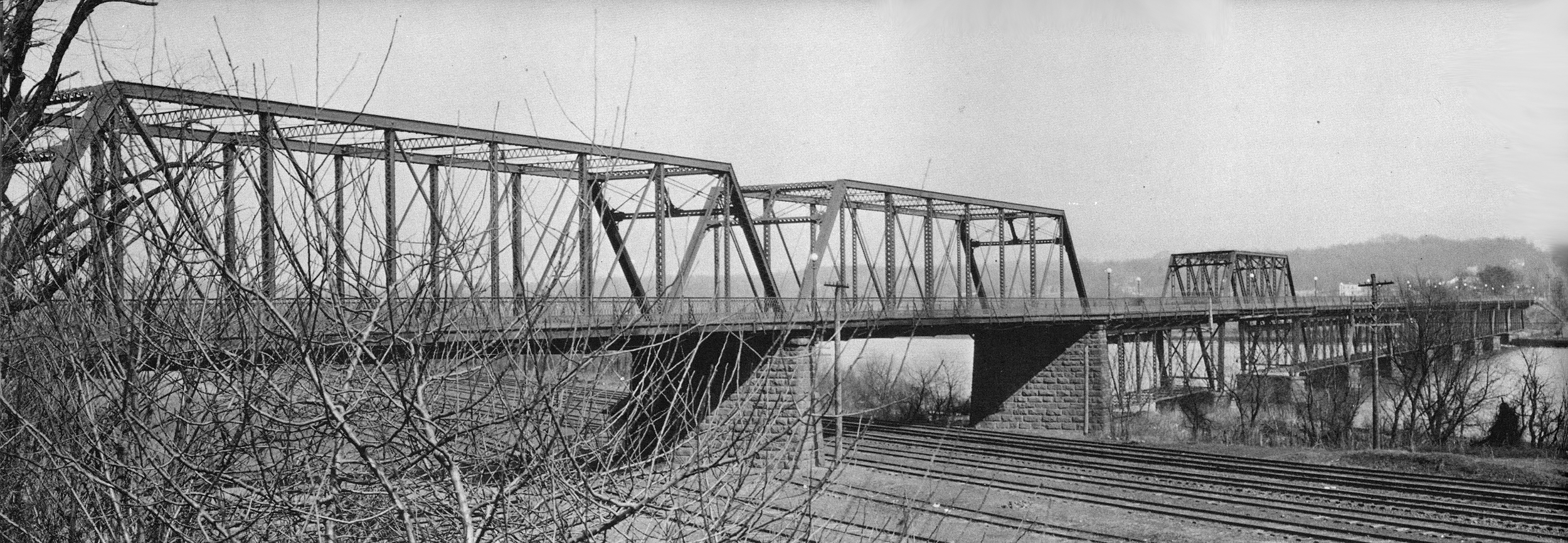
The 1890 bridge, photographed about 1938 shortly before it was demolished.

No bridge connected the east and west ends of Pennsylvania Avenue SE over the Anacostia River between 1845 and 1890. Benning Bridge, erected upstream in 1805, and the 11th Street Bridges, built downstream in 1820, also carried vehicular and foot traffic over the Ancostia. But the Uniontown "suburb" was platted in the Anacostia area in 1854, and development slowly began to turn the agricultural land into businesses and residences. The destruction of the Eastern Branch Bridge in 1846, however, significantly slowed growth in the area for five decades.

About 1871, a real estate development known as "East Washington Heights" began. (Note: East Washington Heights was bounded by Massachusetts Avenue SE, Southern Avenue, Naylor Road SE, and Minnesota Avenue SE. A trapezoid with its base along Southern Avenue, it was almost bisected northwest-to-southeast by Pennsylvania Avenue SE.) Citizens in the area wanted a bridge to reconnect "their" Pennsylvania Avenue (which ran through the center of their neighborhoods) with the Pennsylvania Avenue "in the city". Building a new bridge over the Anacostia River only slowly became an issue for them, and it was not until 1875 that the EWCA began agitating for one. A new bridge, the EWCA pointed out, would save residents of East Washington 4 to 5 miles (6.4 to 8.0 km) in travel every time they visited the city center on the other side of the river. On February 19, 1886, the EWCA formed a committee to lobby the Commissioners of the District of Columbia (the city government) and Congress on the issue.

Later that year, Representative Barnes Compton (D-Maryland) introduced legislation in Congress to build a $60,000 bridge of wood on wooden piers. But the Compton bill was strongly opposed by the D.C. Commissioners. The legislation required that the city pay half the cost of the structure, and Commissioner Samuel E. Wheatley led the city government in adamantly refusing to support the bill. A group of EWCA members began personally lobbying Congress for the bridge. Samuel Taylor Suit, a state senator in the Maryland legislature, won passage of a resolution by that state supporting the bridge. These efforts proved highly successful. Senator Blackburn and Representative Rowell won a $40,000 increase in the amount appropriated for the bridge, and inserted language into the bill requiring that it be constructed of iron and be set on stone piers. This legislation passed both chambers of Congress unanimously on February 23, 1887.

Construction of the new bridge began in November 1887. Complications arose when the Baltimore and Potomac Railroad (B&PR), whose tracks ran along the north/eastern shore of the Anacostia River, sued the federal government, arguing that the bridge abutment encroached on its right-of-way; eventually the railroad agreed to move its tracks closer to the riverbank, and the federal government paid for the move. But yet more construction delays occurred. Due to the heavily silted bottom of the river, the Army Corps of Engineers could not find solid ground on which to build the bridge's piers and abutments, requiring construction of a cofferdam and extensive excavation and investigation of the riverbed. A major flood in 1888 damaged some of the work, and caused further delays.

The new Pennsylvania Avenue Bridge, as it became known, was complete in June 1890. The EWCA decided, however, to delay the bridge's formal dedication and opening until August 25, which was the anniversary of the 1805 bridge's destruction in the War of 1812. The new bridge's dedication was a major even in the history of Washington, D.C. Some 8,000 to 10,000 people attended the event, which included the United States Marine Band, conducted by John Philip Sousa, providing music throughout the afternoon and evening. The total cost of the bridge was $170,000.

Construction of the 1890 bridge led to extensive new development east of the river. As the bridge was being built in 1889, a consortium known as the Bliss-Havemeyer Syndicate purchased 800 acres (3,200,000 m^{2}) of land in the former East Washington Heights development. They built a number of roads in the area, and landscaped the plots along Pennsylvania Avenue SE, Alabama Avenue SE, and Branch Avenue SE with gardens, orchards, pavilions, and shade trees. In 1903, Colonel Arthur E. Randle (Note: Randle, a graduate of the University of Pennsylvania, received the commission of colonel in the Mississippi State Militia from Andrew H. Longino, Governor of the state of Mississippi, in 1902.) formed the United States Realty Company, bought out the Bliss-Havemeyer Syndicate properties, and founded the settlement of Randle Highlands. In 1902, Randle won approval from Congress to lay streetcar tracks across the Pennsylvania Avenue Bridge. By 1905, he had extended his line 0.75 miles (1.21 km) down Pennsylvania Avenue SE into the new Randle Highlands. The streetcar line over the bridge spurred extensive new development east of the river. Randle began selling lots in Randle Highlands at a brisk pace in 1903. He made so much money that by 1905 he formed the development of "North Randle Highlands" (now the neighborhoods of Dupont Park, Penn Branch, and the lower portion of Greenway), which extended to Massachusetts Avenue SE. In October 1906, The Washington Post called Randle's developments "among the largest real estate enterprises ever successfully carried through in the District."

== The John Philip Sousa Bridge ==
=== Campaign for a new bridge ===
As early as 1931, the Randle Highlands Citizens Association (the former East Washington Citizens Association changed its name in 1908) began pressing city government to replace the aging, inadequate Pennsylvania Avenue Bridge.

The campaign to replace the Pennsylvania Avenue Bridge began in earnest in January 1934. The Randle Highlands Citizens Association issued a report to the House Committee on Appropriations asking for a $15,000 grant to study the need for and design of a new bridge. The report noted that roadways with a combined width of 184 feet (56 m) approached the 24-foot-wide (7.3 m) bridge, leading to extensive and dangerous traffic congestion. The citizens association asked that a new bridge, with a 50-to-60-foot (15 to 18 m) roadway and 9-to-12-foot (2.7 to 3.7 m) sidewalks on both sides be constructed. But their request was not acted on. In late summer 1934, Southeast resident Vernis Absher was told by Representative Thomas L. Blanton (who had opposed the bridge) that Congress did not believe citizens of Southeast D.C. were united behind the bridge. Citizens recommended four different locations for a new span, and Congress did not want to get caught in the middle of a political battle over the structure's location. Absher subsequently contacted 11 different citizens' associations in the area, and on September 5, 1934, they agreed to form the Southeast Council of Citizens Associations to speak with one voice for the area.

In January 1935, the City Commissioners submitted a city budget to Congress requesting $15,000 to study a new bridge. The budget won the approval of the Franklin D. Roosevelt administration and the Bureau of the Budget. A handful of representatives in the House stripped the item from the city budget. Although the item was restored in the Senate, it was removed again in the conference committee. The bridge suffered partial collapse in the early summer of 1935 when a portion of the wooden timbers supporting the road deck collapsed, requiring replacement. The damage was not extensive, however, and the bridge was still considered to be structurally sound. However, the Corps of Engineers limited the weight of vehicles permitted to cross the structure. But in August 1935 the Southeast Businessmen's Association (a group of east-of-the-river business owners) threatened to petition the Franklin D. Roosevelt administration for a new bridge. If that failed, they warned they would seek a redress of grievances in federal court.

A third push for the bridge occurred in 1936. Although the Great Depression in the United States was improving, there was a significant effort being made to balance the federal budget. (This budget-tightening would significantly contribute to the Recession of 1937–38.) City commissioners submitted a budget of $47.9 million to the Bureau of the Budget, but saw $4.3 million cut from it. However, a request for $25,000 for a bridge study was retained. On January 21, the Southeast Businessmen's Association and several citizen associations in the area sent a letter to the Subcommittee of the House Committee on Appropriations and to the Subcommittee of the Senate Committee on Appropriations asking for appropriation of the study funds. In addition to underscoring the dangerous nature of the traffic problems and the deleterious economic effect the out-of-date bridge created, they pointed out that the 67,337 people living east of the river paid 15.5 percent of all city tax revenues but received just 3 percent of its expenditures. (Note: The District of Columbia had an estimated 637,000 residents in 1936. Thus, about 10.5 percent of city residents lived east of the Anacostia River.) On April 6, the Federation of Citizens Association (an umbrella group representing all citizens associations in the city) endorsed the study request in a hearing before the Subcommittee of the Senate Committee on Appropriations. The fate of the District's budget was placed in jeopardy on May 21, 1936, when Representative Thomas L. Blanton (D-Texas) refused to compromise with Senate conference committee members on a wide range of issues (including the "federal payment" to the city's budget). (Note: The United States Constitution prohibits the taxation of federally owned property. Furthermore, the taxation of land and buildings belonging to foreign governments (such as embassy land) or to international organizations is prohibited by treaty. Congress has also, by law, exempted a wide range of nonprofits (such as churches, colleges, hospitals, and quasi-governmental corporations) from taxation. Although cities normally derive about 60 percent of their revenues from property taxes, about 45 percent of all land in the District of Columbia is tax-exempt. (About two-thirds of this exempt land is federally owned.) To compensate the city for this loss of revenue, the federal government in 1879 agreed to make a "federal payment" to the city's tax coffers each year. Until 1920, this amounted to about half the city's budget. The payment fluctuated considerably after 1920, although by law a payment was required. The federal payment was suspended in August 1997 with the passage of the National Capital Revitalization and Self-Government Improvement Act (the "Revitalization Act"). However, the Revitalization Act committed the federal government to try to make a "federal contribution" each year, although this was not mandatory as under previous law.) The city was faced with the prospect of having no budget, and all its funding directly approved by President Roosevelt as "relief". With Congress racing to a June 20 adjournment, Roosevelt threw his weight behind the Senate. Although the House initially resisted, the final bill (with only minor changes from the Senate version) passed on June 19 and was signed into law by President Roosevelt on June 23. It included the hard-won $25,000 appropriation for a Pennsylvania Avenue Bridge study.

As Captain Herbert C. Whitehurst of the U.S. Army Corps of Engineers prepared to conduct the study, the Washington Board of Trade prepared for a positive outcome. On July 2, it voted to create a committee to lobby Congress for the funds to build the new bridge. Twelve days later, the Southeast Business Men's Association formed a committee to lobby the District Commissioners for a $750,000 appropriation to build a new bridge.

=== Seeking authorization and funding for the bridge ===
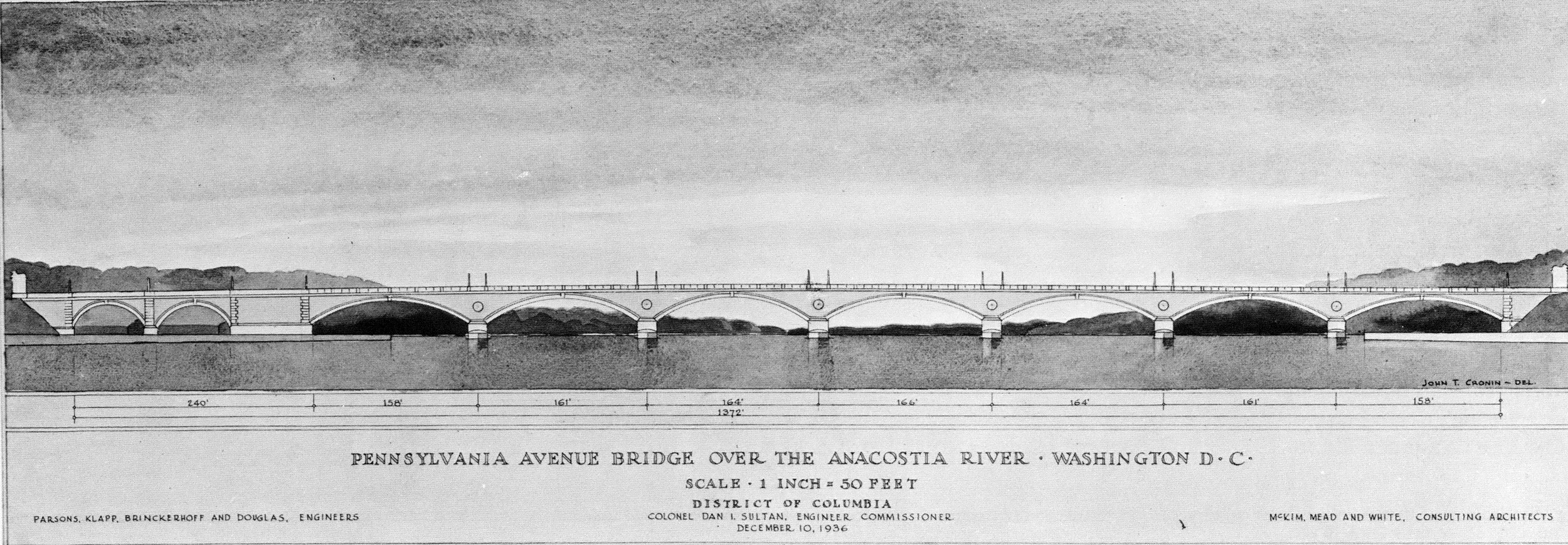
Design approved in 1937 by the U.S. Commission of Fine Arts for the Sousa Bridge.

Captain Whitehurst's study, as expected, recommended approval of a new bridge in the same location as the existing bridge, and in President Roosevelt's fiscal 1938 budget for the city $325,000 was recommended to begin construction. This would allow surveys and designs to be completed. The total cost of the new span was estimated at $1.25 million. The Subcommittee of the House Appropriations Committee, however, stripped the funding for a new bridge and inserted a $40,000 appropriation for repairs instead, after concluding that rising steel prices meant a new bridge could not be constructed for less than $2 million. The Subcommittee of the Senate Appropriations Committee restored the $325,000 appropriation on June 5. The full Senate adopted the subcommittee's recommendation on June 8. But the conference committee stripped the appropriation from the final bill.

The new bridge received its name when the Southeast Citizens Association (led by member Orrin J. Davy) asked that the bridge be named for the Sousa (the "March King"), who died in 1932. Senator Royal S. Copeland (D-New York) introduced a resolution (S. 2651) on June 15, 1937, ordering the bridge to be named after famed composer, conductor, and D.C. native John Philip Sousa. The bill passed the Senate, but was not taken up in the House. Copeland reintroduced the measure (S. 494) on January 10, 1939, and it passed both houses of Congress on February 27. President Roosevelt signed it into law (Public Law No. 5) on March 7, 1939.

Meanwhile, Captain Whithurst's preliminary design for the bridge was approved by both the National Capital Planning Commission and the United States Commission of Fine Arts.

As the city began crafting is fiscal 1939 budget, Captain Whitehurst adopted a new legislative strategy. He submitted to the City Commissioners a five-year plan laying out all transportation infrastructure requirements for the national capital, prioritizing each item. Colonel Dan L. Sultan, the Engineer Commissioner, subsequently distributed Whitehurst's strategic plan to a wide range of federal agencies, private companies (such as utilities and streetcar companies), and citizen groups, seeking their input. The top priority for bridge construction was a new Pennsylvania Avenue Bridge. Whitehurst proposed spending $650,000 in fiscal 1939 to survey and design the structure and begin its construction. Whitehurst's proposal received the immediate support of the Hillcrest Citizens Association, which began lobbying the District Commissioners to seek the appropriation yet again.

The City Commissioners duly submitted the budget request, and on January 6, 1938, the Bureau of the Budget submitted to Congress a city budget that listed an underpass at Dupont Circle and the new Pennsylvania Avenue Bridge as its top transportation infrastructure priorities. (Note: An underpass at Thomas Circle and a structuring of Scott Circle were submitted by the D.C. Commissioners, but deferred by the Bureau of the Budget.) The authorized cost of the bridge was $2 million, with a 1939 appropriation of $650,000. But the chair of the Subcommittee on Appropriations in the House, Representative Ross A. Collins (D-Mississippi), argued that a far more important project was the K Street viaduct, a proposed elevated highway over K Street NW and Water Street NW between 26th Street NW and Key Bridge. As there was no opposition to the Dupont Circle underpass on fiscal grounds, the bridge appropriation would be deleted. The subcommittee also added funds for the Thomas Circle underpass. The Washington Board of Trade's bridge committee was outraged, and called for protests by all citizens associations in the city. Adelbert W. Lee, chair of the bridge committee, pointed out that more than 15,000 vehicles a day crossed the bridge (the oldest in the city), and that modern firefighting equipment could not cross the bridge due to weight restrictions. Lee said Collins' claim about opposition was untrue, and that both the Dupont Circle and Thomas Circle underpasses were opposed by some citizens while not a single protest had been registered against the bridge proposal. Nonetheless, the bill went to the House floor on January 27, 1938, without the bridge appropriation. Representative Stephen Warfield Gambrill (D-Maryland) attempted to amend the bill on the floor of the House on February 1 by restoring the funds, but the amendment was not offered after Collins won a Point of order vote against it. On February 5, the Federation of Citizens Associations passed a resolution advocating cancellation of all underpass construction so that the Pennsylvania Avenue Bridge could be rebuilt.

In the Subcommittee on Appropriations in the Senate, however, Senator Millard Tydings (D-Maryland) said he would seek to add the bridged appropriation (although he would not hold up the bill if the effort failed). Senator Elmer Thomas (D-Oklahoma) demanded that if Tydings' effort was successful that other projects be cut so as not to raise the overall cost of the bill. Members of the Northeast Washington Citizens Association and the Congress Heights Citizens Association both testified in favor of the Tydings amendment. The subcommittee restored the appropriation on March 2 at a reported $620,000, cancelling the Dupont and Thomas Circle underpasses and the K Street viaduct. The full Appropriations Committee approved the bill on March 3. A conference committee agreed on March 14 to adopt a conference bill that included the bridge appropriation at the Senate level, and the final bill passed Congress on May 18.

=== Construction of the Sousa Bridge ===
With funding for the bridge secured, Captain Whitehurst said that plans for the structure should be finalized on June 1, 1938. The construction schedule provide for advertising of contracts in June, and work to begin in mid-August. The downstream span of the structure would be completed before the current bridge was dismantled and a new span built in its place. The total timeframe for construction was 25 to 31 months. The Commission of Fine Arts recommended that the bridge be faced in pink granite. The roadway would be 60 feet (18 m) wide.

Penker Construction of Cincinnati, Ohio, was awarded the bid to construct the new bridge. Of the 10 bidders, Penker's was the lowest bid at just under $1,821,250. Its contract required the bridge to be built within 400 calendar days after the old bridge is closed. It also required the new bridge to be constructed of pink granite. Penker also won a $23,000 contract to demolish the bridge. (Note: The contract also permitted the new bridge to be constructed of grey granite, limestone, sandstone, or concrete facing, if the cost of pink granite was too high.)

About March 5, 1939, a labor dispute halted work in the bridge. The jurisdictional strike occurred in a dispute over whether the steel workers or rod workers union would have the right to trim steel rods on the project. The dispute lasted nearly two weeks. Both unions agreed to return to work on March 19, pending a resolution of their dispute through arbitration.

A second labor dispute halted work on the bridge when 200 members of Sand and Gravel Workers Union Local 22075 went out on strike over a refusal by the Smoot Sand and Gravel Corporation to adopt the closed shop. The strike, which began on August 14, immediately halted concrete work not only on the new Sousa Bridge but on more than 20 building and transportation infrastructure projects, and idled more than 5,000 workers. Howard T. Colvin, a United States Department of Labor conciliator, was called in to help end the dispute. Initially, Colvin expressed optimism that the strike could be settled swiftly. But the union rejected a potential settlement on August 23 because it lacked specific wage and hour agreements. On August 25, Representative William Alvin Pittenger (R-Minnesota) asked the Army Corps of Engineers to break the strike and supply sand and gravel itself. The Army refused. On August 28, the federal government intervened in the strike. Federal Works Agency Administrator John M. Carmody questioned why the single source was used to supply all the sand and gravel to so much projects, and threatened to find a new supplier if a settlement was not forthcoming. John R. Steelman, head of the Federal Mediation and Conciliation Service, announced he was personally intervening in the negotiations to bring an end to the strike. Meanwhile, Colvin proposed a strike settlement which was immediately accepted by the union and rejected by the company. (Note: Colvin proposed 1) an immediate end to the strike; 2) reinstatement of all striking workers; 3) recognition of the union by the employer; and 4) that the company enter into negotiations with the union within 30 calendar days. The company refused these terms, arguing instead that the strike end immediately without any concessions. It also proposed that, once the strike was over, worker representatives would meet personally with company owner Lewis Smoot at some future date. However, the company noted that Smoot had been "confined to bed" since the strike began and was unlikely to meet any time soon.) Carmody and Steelman's intervention appeared to work. Progress in strike talks was announced on August 30, and on September 5 the company and union ended the strike after agreeing to Colvin's terms.

An appropriations request to finish the second span of the bridge was made to city commissioners in September 1939. On October 21, with the downstream span nearing completion, the Highway Engineering & Construction Co. of Washington, D.C., was given a $46,000 contract to pave the span. By the end of November, the downstream span was nearly complete.

=== Dedication of the first span ===
The downstream span of the John Philip Sousa Bridge was opened on December 9, 1939, before a crowd of more than 12,000. Nine-year-old Nancy Lee, daughter of Adelbert Lee (president of the Randle Highlands Citizens Association and vice president of the Southeast Business Men's Association) cut the ribbon opening the bridge. Captain Whitehurst presented the bridge to the District Commissioners. Present for the dedication were Sousa's daughters, Jane Priscilla Sousa and Helen Sousa Abert, and Sousa's sister, 89-year-old Catherine Sousa Varela. The United States Marine Band provided the music for the event. Two Boy Scouts, George Durham and Jack Green, played "Taps" in the direction of nearby Congressional Cemetery (where Sousa was buried).

The old Pennsylvania Avenue Bridge span closed the same day as the dedication, and demolition of the span began a few days later.

=== Construction and dedication of the second span ===
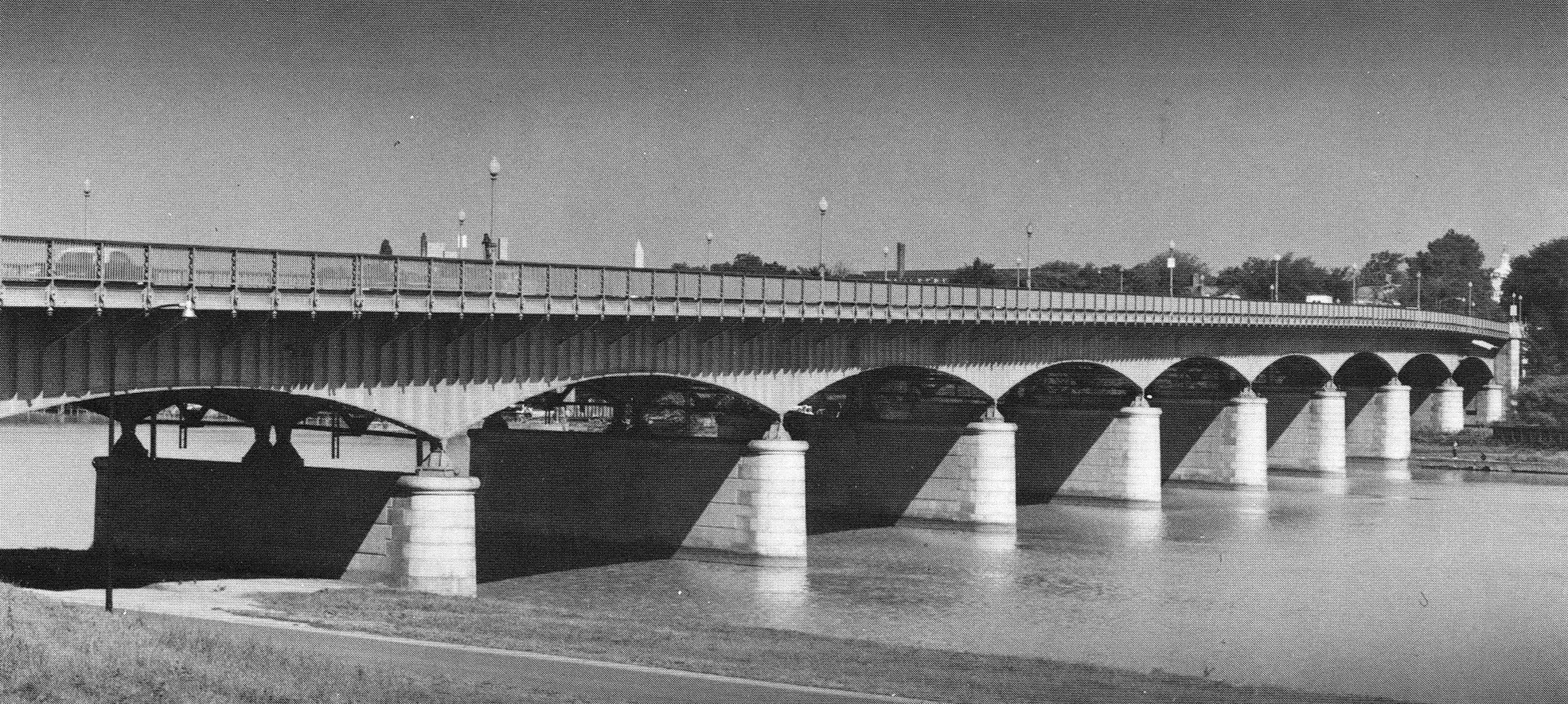
Looking west at the John Philip Sousa Bridge over the Anacostia River in 1968

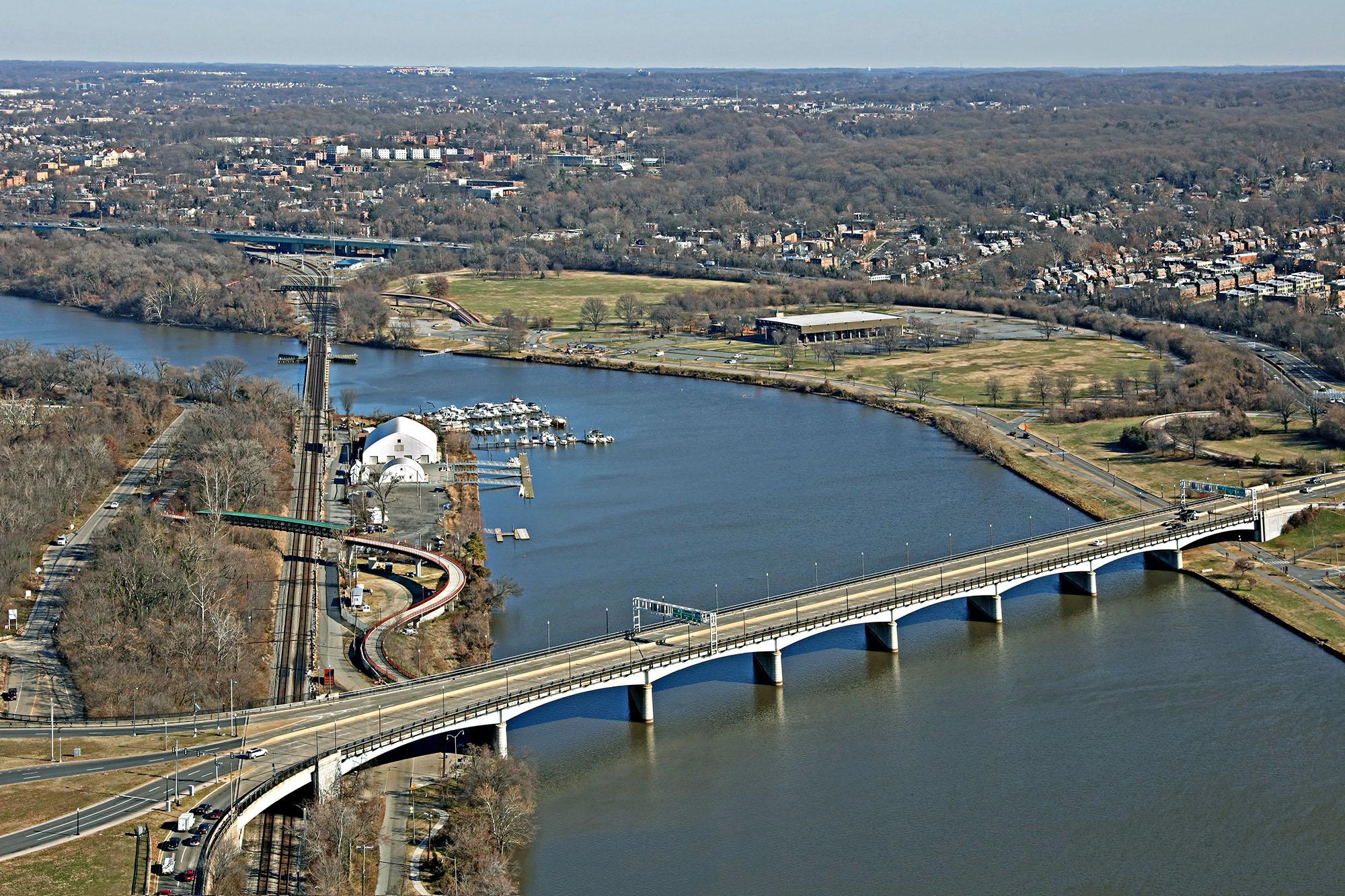
John Philip Sousa Bridge Looking North

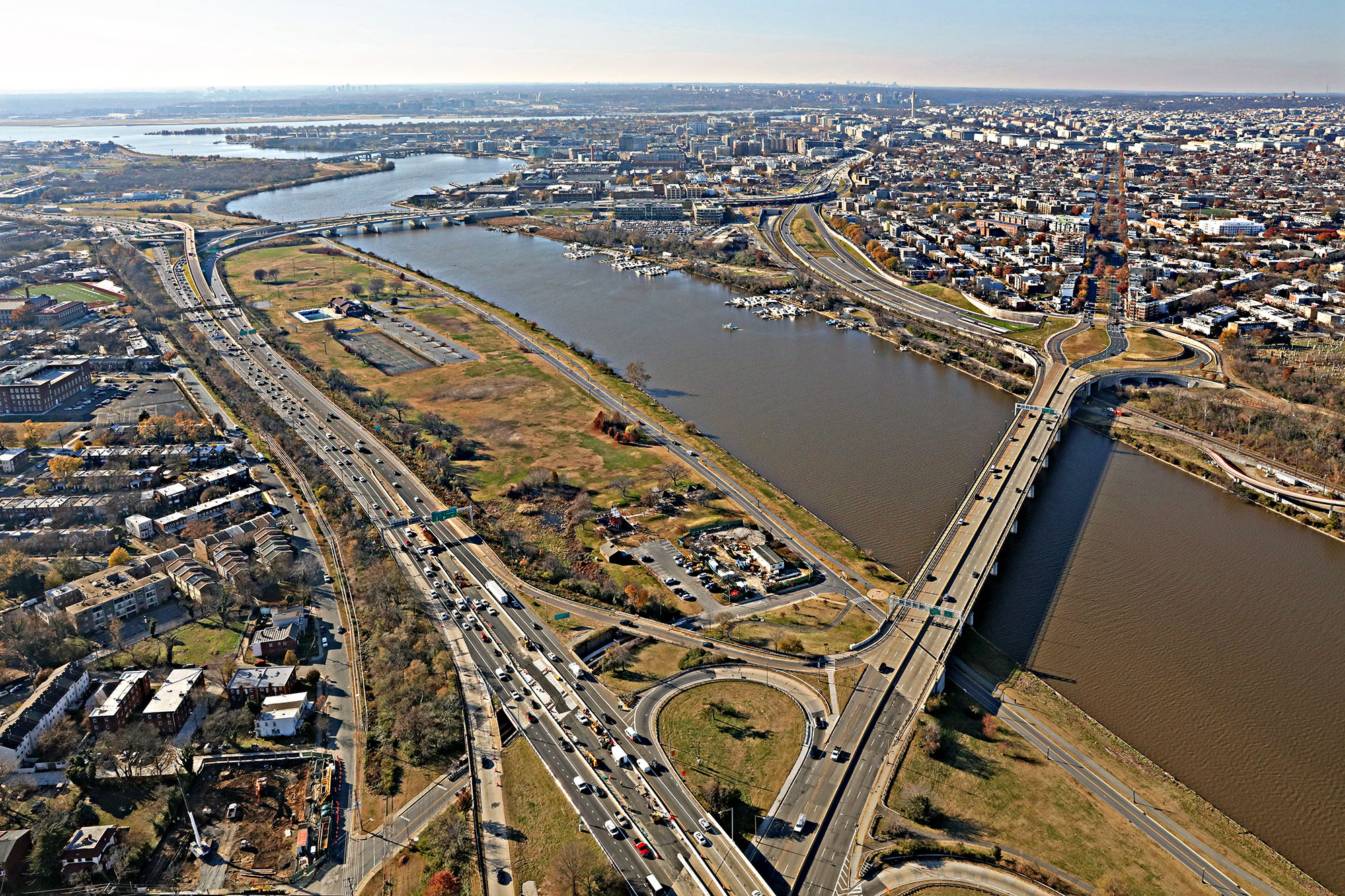
John Philip Sousa Bridge and I-295 Looking SW

Full funding for the completion of the second span was included by the D.C. Commissioners in their federal budget submission for fiscal 1941. There was no dispute over the funding, and the appropriation was made.

Work on the second span was temporarily interrupted in July 1940 when 250 workers at Smoot Sand & Gravel walked out to protest a job classification by the federal Wage and Hour Division. The men worked on barges dredging gravel, and wanted to be classified as seamen so they could qualify for overtime and work more than the federally approved 42-hour work week. The strike began on July 9, lasted five days, and idled more than 6,500 workers (including those working on the Social Security and Railroad Retirement Board buildings) as no concrete could be delivered. The men won reclassification as seamen, a 10 percent wage increase, and pay for five days they were idle.

Planning for the span's dedication began in October 1940. In mid-December, the downstream span was closed and traffic shifted onto the newly completed north span to allow the removal of the temporary division of the south span and its resurfacing. Construction delays, however, meant that the traffic diversion did not occur until January 2, 1941. On December 21, Captain Whitehurst announced that the Sousa Bridge would be completed on January 15, 1941.

The north span was formally dedicated in a small ceremony on January 18, 1941.

== The Ellicott Circle connection ==
When originally completed in 1941, the bridge connected to what was then called Ellicott Circle on the east bank of the Anacostia, but in 1957, the District began work on the Anacostia Freeway, a project that replaced the circle with a freeway interchange and new ramps to Anacostia Drive. Work on the Pennsylvania avenue interchange began in late November 1961 and completed in May 1964.

== The Barney Circle connection ==
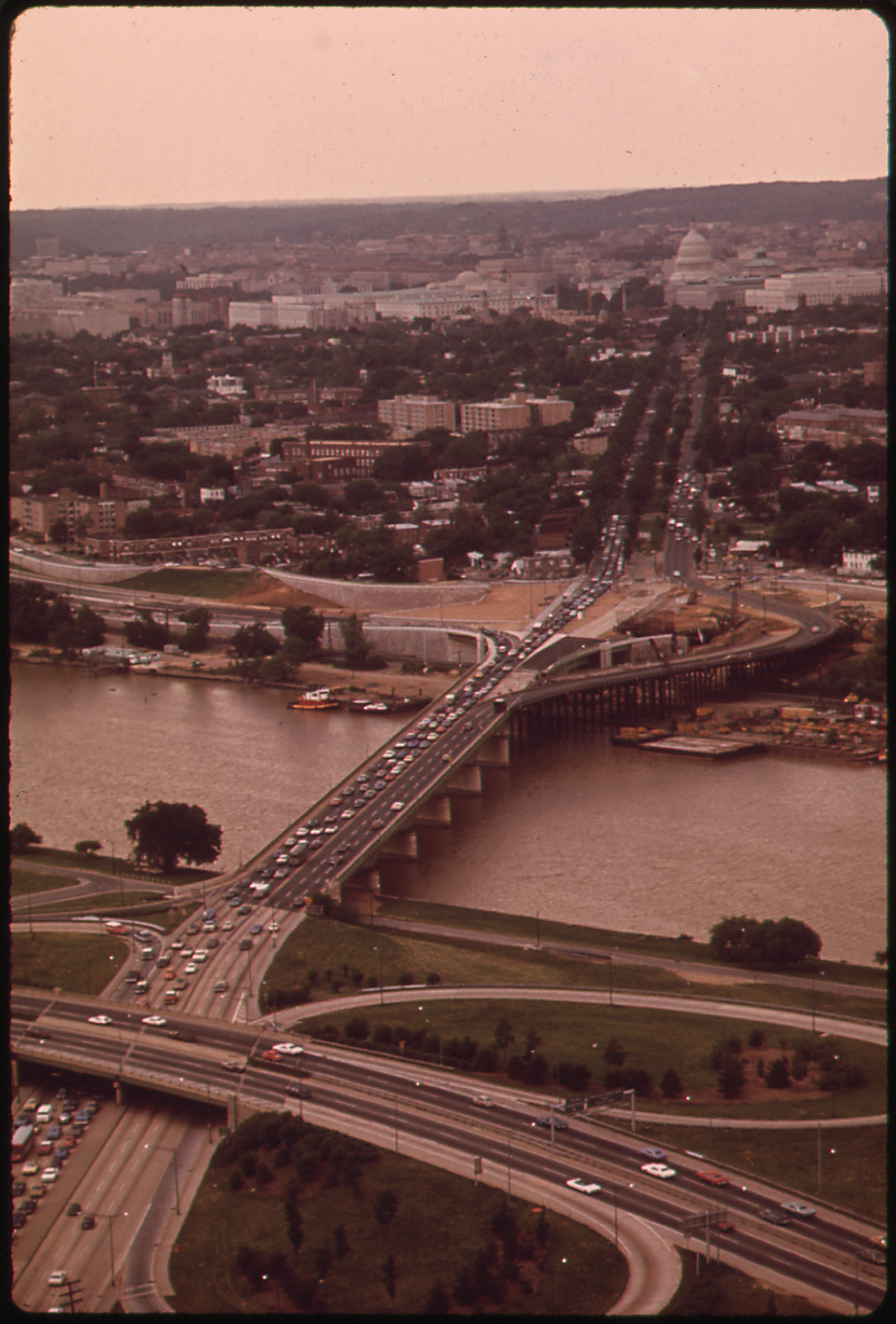
The John Philip Sousa Bridge in 1973, with Barney Circle on the far side of the bridge and the Anacostia Freeway interchange in the foreground

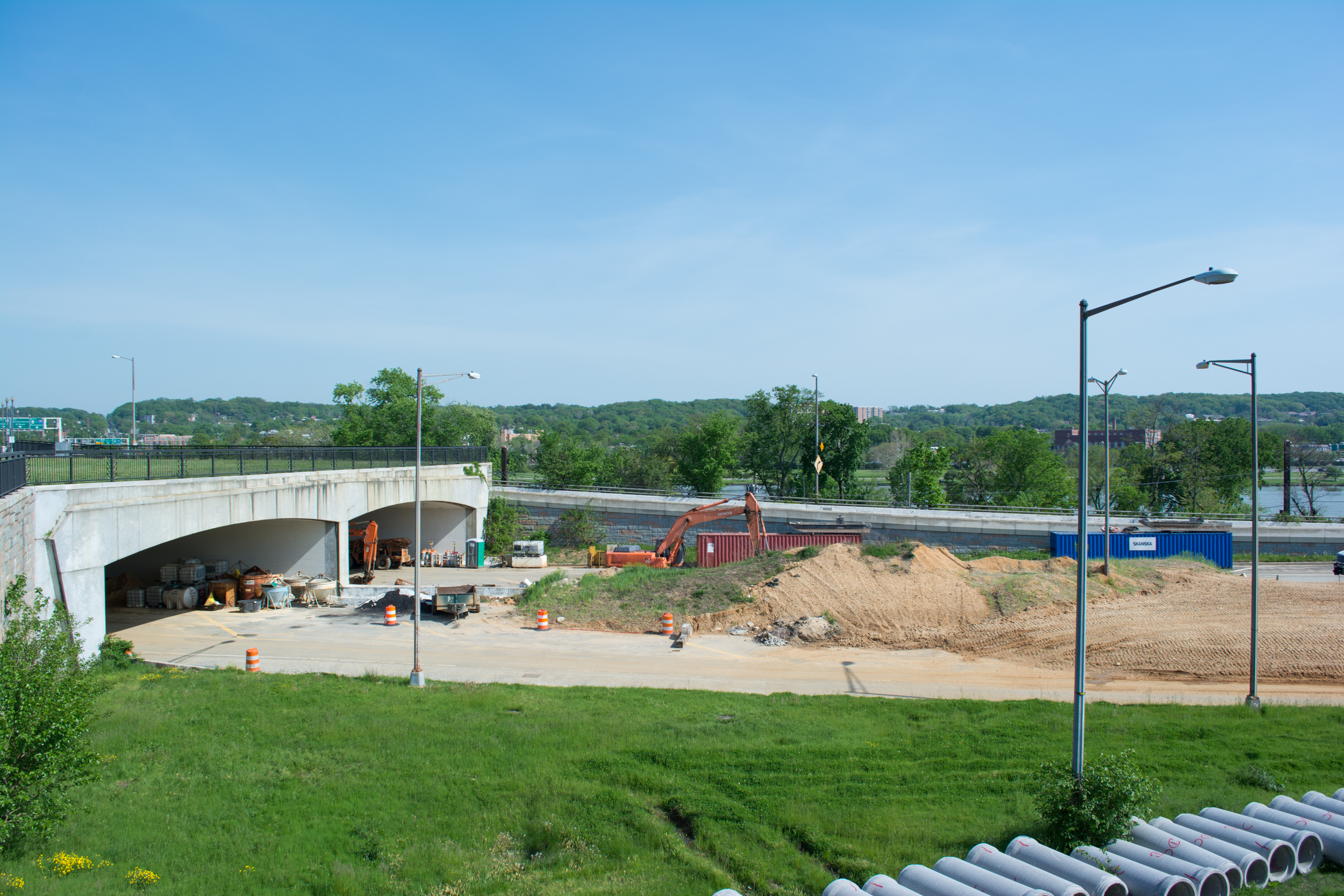
Looking southwest from Barney Circle along John Philip Sousa Bridge in May 2014 at the now-unused Interstate 695 as it passes beneath the bridge's northern approaches. Construction on the new "Southeast Boulevard" is under way.

When constructed, the Sousa Bridge connected with Barney Circle, a traffic circle that forms the terminus foot of Pennsylvania Avenue SE, Kentucky Avenue SE, 17th Street SE, and M Street SE. A streetcar turnaround and bus lane was carved from the center of the circle, and a $7,000 bus and streetcar terminal occupied the western portion of the site. The terminal opened on January 26, 1941.

In 1956, federal and regional transportation planners proposed an Inner Loop Expressway composed of three circumferential beltways for the District of Columbia. The middle beltway would have begun at the proposed Barney Circle Freeway near Robert F. Kennedy Memorial Stadium, until it terminated near 37th Street NW at the north end of Georgetown.

From 1969 to 1974, the District rebuilt Barney Circle to accommodate the freeway. The turnaround loop and transit stop were removed and the circle dug out. What was to be the Southwest Freeway was built under the circle, with a curving ramp connecting the bridge to the freeway. When the circle was rebuilt, Pennsylvania Avenue was realigned to go straight across the circle. During construction, traffic was rerouted around the circle on a temporary scaffold-like viaduct. But before the project could be finished, the continuation of the freeway north was in trouble.

Two decades of protest led to the cancellation of all but the I-395 and I-695 portions of the plan, and the unbuilt portions of the project were finally cancelled in 1977. The failure to complete the Inner Loop left the Sousa Bridge's approaches incomplete and confusing. Unmarked Interstate 695 delivered three lanes of traffic to a one-lane on-ramp to the bridge, and traffic backed up for miles every day as a traffic light allowed only a few cars onto the bridge's southbound lanes during rush hour. An off-ramp delivered most northbound bridge traffic around the incomplete Barney Circle and under the bridge onto Interstate 695 westbound.

Ultimately, motorists wanting to access the Baltimore–Washington Parkway or U.S. Route 50 in Maryland (the John Hanson Highway) would often travel Interstate 695 to Barney Circle, wait at the traffic light there, cross the Sousa Bridge, wait at a traffic light on the southwestern terminus of the bridge, and make a left turn against oncoming traffic to access a narrow and dangerous ramp that led to northbound D.C. Route 295 (the Anacostia Freeway). The combination of traffic lights, left turn, and mixing of both through-traffic and local traffic created extensive traffic congestion on the Sousa Bridge during evening rush hour.

In 1975, federal, regional, and city transportation planners proposed an extension to I-695/Southeast Freeway to be called the "Barney Circle Freeway" to help alleviate the problems created by the failure to complete the Inner Loop. The freeway would extend I-695 past its existing terminus at Barney Circle and travel along the western bank of the Anacostia River (through Anacostia Park) to a new bridge over the Anacostia River at Burnham Barrier, providing vehicles easy access to the Anacostia Freeway. The Barney Circle Freeway would have delinked Barney Circle from I-695, and restricted the on- and off-ramps to Sousa Bridge so that the bridge returned to its traditional function as a local bridge rather than a route for commuters to access the Anacostia Freeway and points east in the state of Maryland. The combined bridge and freeway project was ready for construction to begin in 1981, and its cost was estimated to be $93.5 million. But after protests from residents of Capitol Hill (who feared the Barney Circle Freeway would cause more traffic to flow into the area) as well as environmentalists, and legal and regulatory challenges, Federal Highway Administration (FHWA) officials agreed in August 1994 to conduct an additional environmental impact assessment regarding the project, but later said the assessment's findings did not alter its earlier conclusion that construction of the roadway and bridge project was economically feasible, technologically appropriate, and environmentally sound. However, the D.C. City Council had the final say on whether to proceed with the project or not. In December 1994, the City Council bowed to neighborhood opposition and voted overwhelmingly to reject the project.

In 2009, the District of Columbia Department of Transportation (DDOT) began the replacement of the 11th Street Bridges just down the Anacostia River. It closed and decommissioned the segment of Interstate 695 from the 11th Street Bridges to Barney Circle by early 2013. These changes removed a significant portion of the traffic using Sousa Bridge, from 50,000 vehicles per day (each way) in 2004 to an estimated 35,000 vehicles per day (each way) in 2030. DDOT also redesigned and rebuilt the ramp from Pennsylvania Avenue SE to northbound D.C. Route 295 to improve its safety. Decommissioned Interstate 695 began to be transformed into a boulevard named "Southeast Boulevard", a four-lane grand boulevard with a landscaped median and pedestrian nature trail designed to link Barney Circle to 11th Street SE.

== 1994-5 reconstruction ==
From April 1994 to December 1995, the bridge was reconstructed and widened from 72 feet (22 m) to 91 feet (28 m), which required the abutments to be widened too. It received a new surface, structural work and new bicycle and pedestrian access. The work strengthened the bridge, widened the lanes from 9 feet 8 inches (2.95 m) to 11 feet (3.4 m), widened the sidewalks to accommodate bicycles, created a barrier between the sidewalks and the roadway and added a median barrier.

== Current status ==
A 2013 DDOT inspection of the Sousa Bridge found it to be structurally sound but only in "fair" condition. However, two bridges on the Sousa Bridge's eastern end, carrying traffic from the bridge to D.C. Route 295 (passing over an access road in Anacostia Park), were found to be in serious disrepair in July 2014. DDOT subsequently budgeted money in fiscal 2016 to repair the bridges.

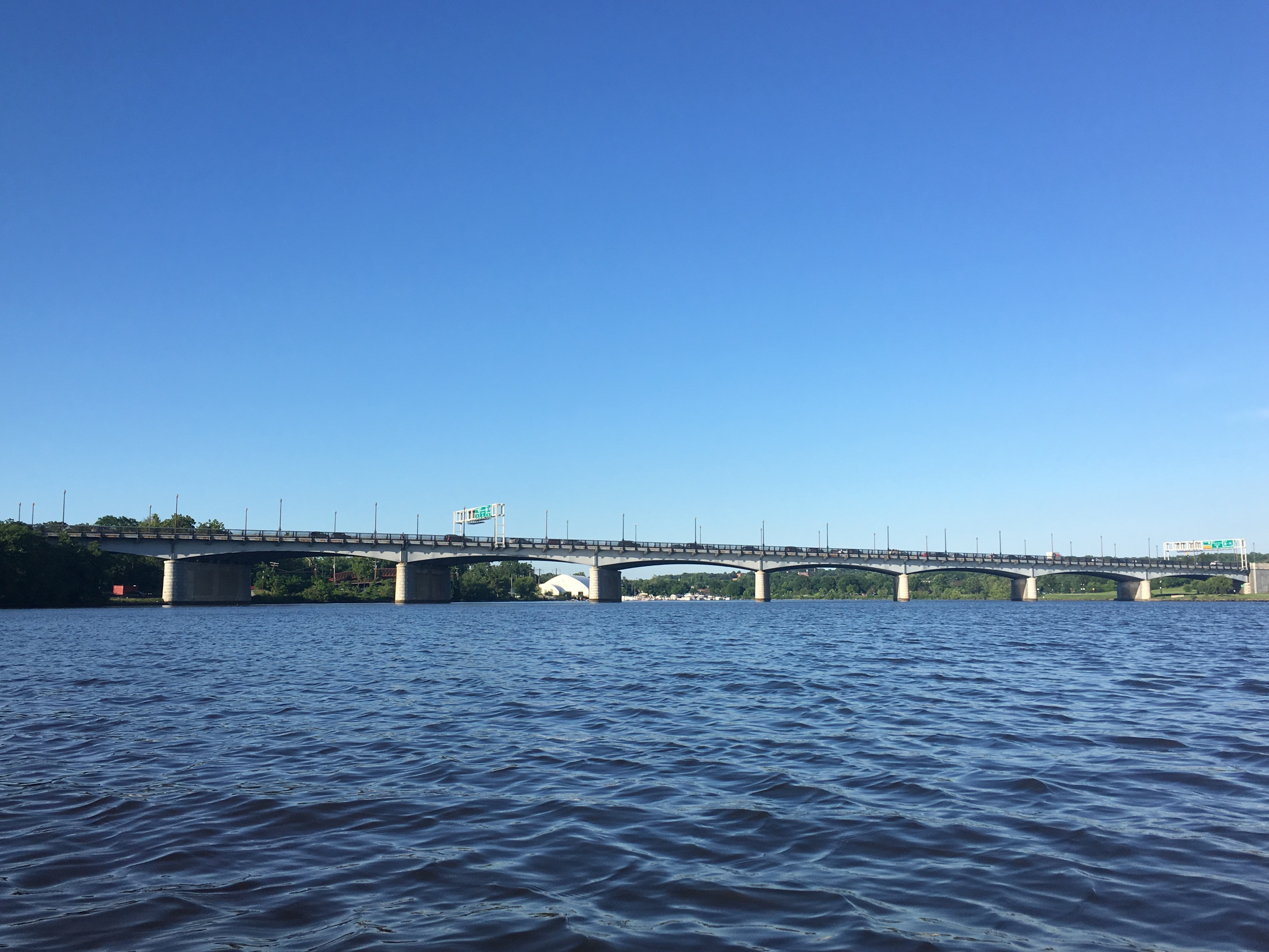
The John Philip Sousa Bridge, in June 2017, taken from the Anacostia River
