= Kenilworth Park and Aquatic Gardens =

Park in Washington, D.C., United States

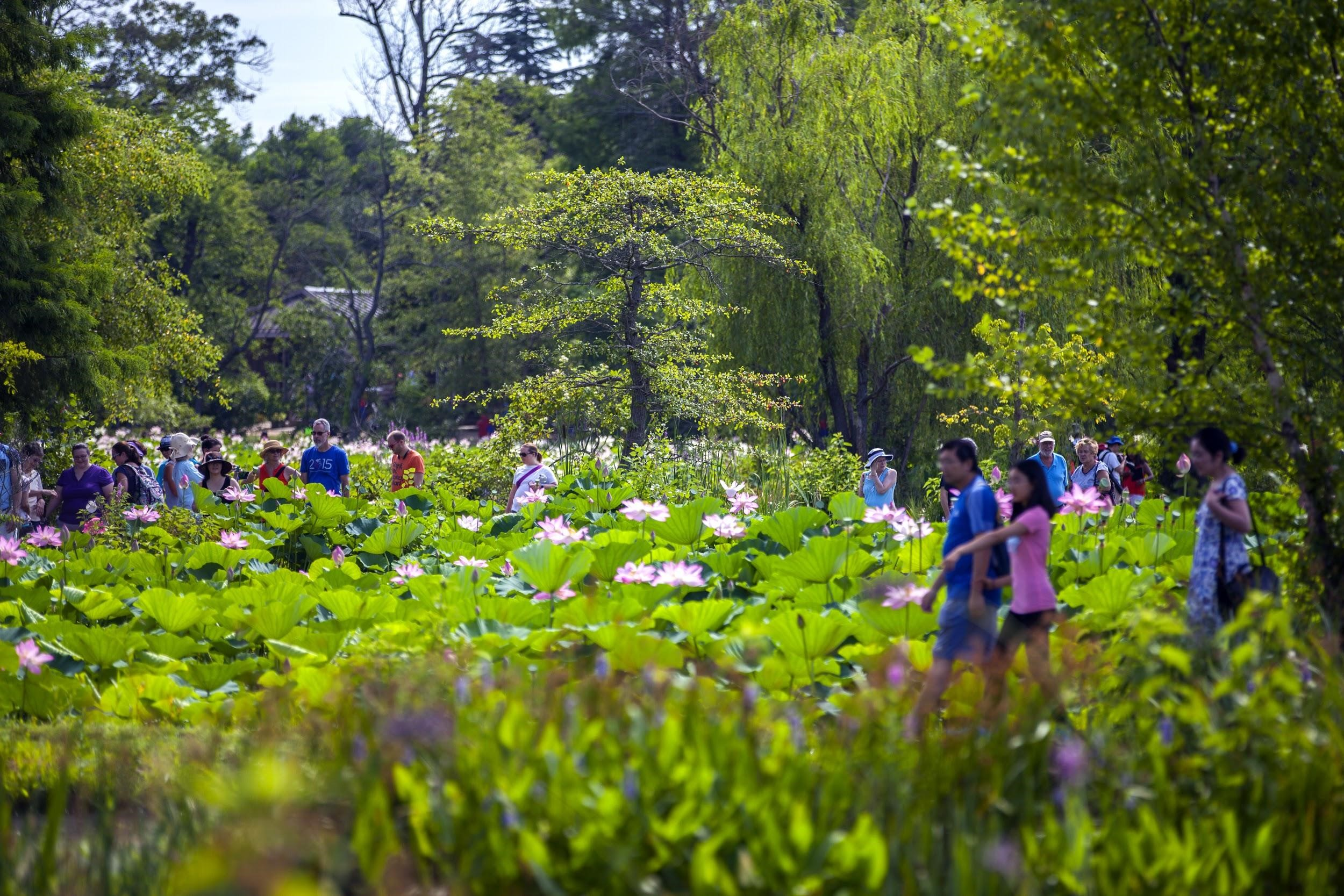
- Visitors at the 2016 Water Lilly and Lotus Festival at Kenilworth Park & Aquatic Gardens

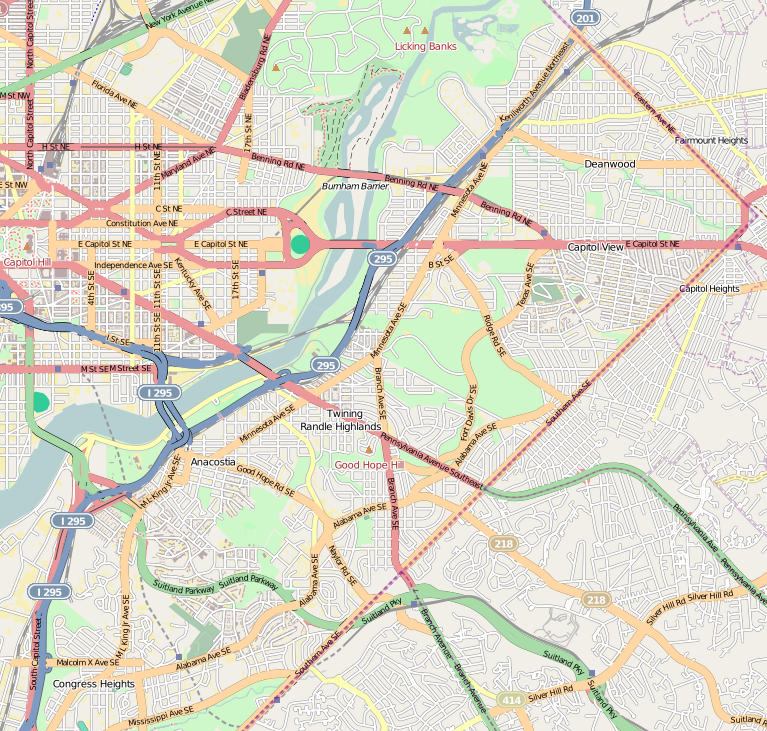
- Location within Washington, D.C. Location within the District of Columbia Location within the United States
- Location: District of Columbia, USA
- Nearest city: Washington, D.C.
- Coordinates: 38°54′32″N 76°56′55″W
- Area: about 700 acres (280 ha)
- Established: 1938
- Governing body: National Park Service
- Website: www.nps.gov/keaq/index.htm

Kenilworth Park & Aquatic Gardens is a National Park Service site located in the north eastern corner of Washington, D.C., near the Maryland state border. Nestled near the banks of the Anacostia River and directly west of the Baltimore–Washington Parkway, Kenilworth Park & Aquatic Gardens preserves a plethora of rare waterlilies and lotuses in the cultivated ponds near the river. The park also contains the Kenilworth Marsh, the largest remaining tidal marsh in Washington, D.C., and an adjacent recreational area.

== Biology ==
The park is home to a wide variety of biota once native to the region before urban sprawl took the surrounding land. Amphibians, birds, fish, and insects congregate in the marshland in numbers along with many kinds of plants including wildflowers. According to a species count by the Patuxent Wildlife Research Center, there were 650 species of insects, 150 species of land plants, 76 species of birds, 18 species of fish, 9 species of mammals, and 8 species of reptiles along with other organisms such as algae, archaeans, bacteria, lichens, mushrooms, and worms. The Audubon Society also does an annual bird count around December and the count in 2007 came up with 59 different species of birds. All in all, 257 different species of birds have been sighted for all four seasons, including herons, shorebirds, sparrows, and a host of less commonly seen birds. Mammals sighted in the park include beavers, muskrats, minks, deer, foxes, and coyotes. In addition, other wetland plants besides the lilies that thrive abundantly include wild rice and the all-season cattail. Unfortunately, many invasive species such as snakeheads have been found in the ponds and marshland within the park.

== History ==
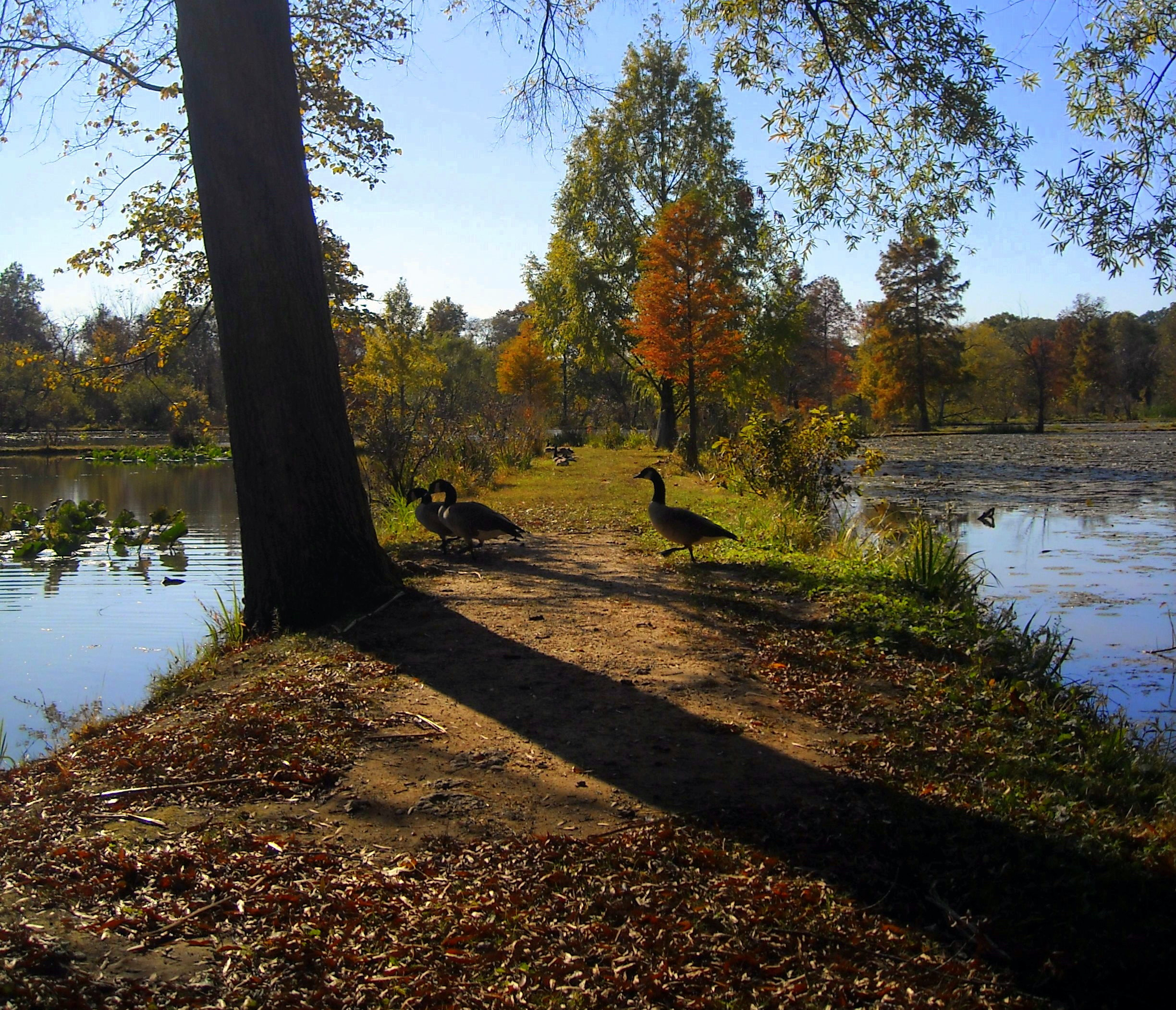
Canada geese crossing a path in the Kenilworth Park and Aquatic Gardens

The land that is now Kenilworth Aquatic Gardens originally was purchased by Civil War veteran Walter B. Shaw in the 1880s. Feeling homesick, Shaw had wild waterlilies native to his home state of Maine brought and planted in the land. When the flowers Shaw brought thrived in the environment, Shaw brought in more plants and started a commercial attraction under the name W.B. Shaw Lily Ponds in 1912. In 1921, when Shaw died, his daughter, Helen Shaw Fowler, took over the prospering business which was being visited by many dignitaries, including U.S. presidents. Unfortunately, by this time the nearby Anacostia River had become filled with an excess of silt making navigation on the river difficult. The United States Army Corps of Engineers was called in to dredge the river which meant that the gardens were in danger of being destroyed. Helen fought to save the gardens and eventually in 1938, U.S. Congress authorized the purchase of the gardens for $15,000 to create the park.

In 1942, the area of today's park located south of the gardens was selected by the congressionally-appointed DC government as the site for a municipal dump, in which trash was burned in open piles. The Kenilworth Dump was closed in the 1970s. Considerable environmental remediation work is needed in this area; for this reason, the Anacostia Riverwalk Trail was routed through the adjacent neighborhood until remediation is complete.

== The park today ==
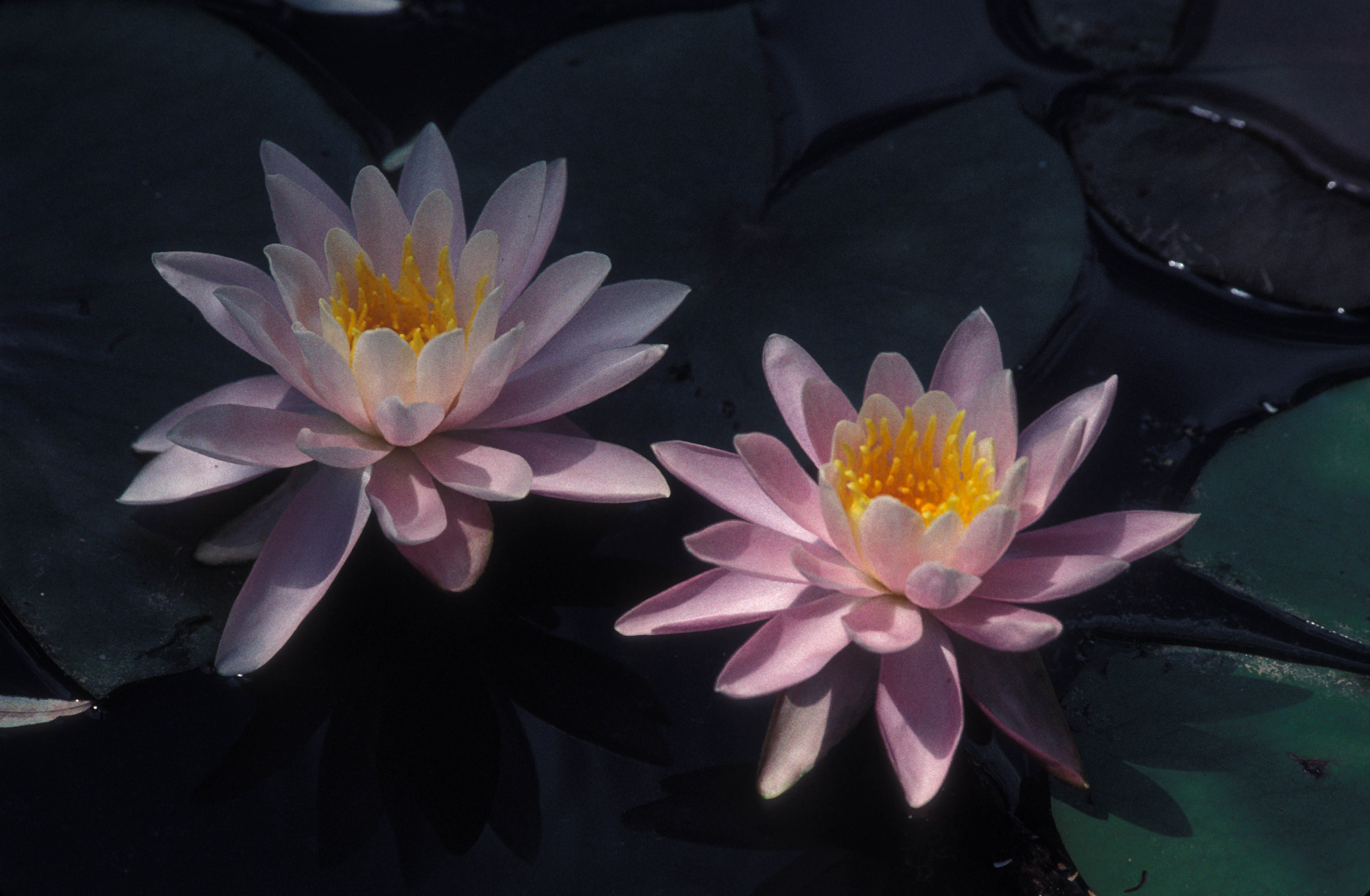
Waterlilies in the park

Today, the park is under the administrative portion of National Capital Parks-East of the National Park Service. The total area of the park is about 700 acres (2.8 km^{2}) large and constitutes the water gardens, Kenilworth Marsh, ballfields, and recreational facilities. The gardens have since been listed on the National Register of Historic Places and also designated a Category II Landmark by the Joint Committee on Landmarks of the National Capital. Portions of Kenilworth Marsh have also undergone restoration in 1992-1993, adding 32 acres (130,000 m^{2}) of tidal marsh out of what was mud flats.
