= Ethel Kennedy Bridge =

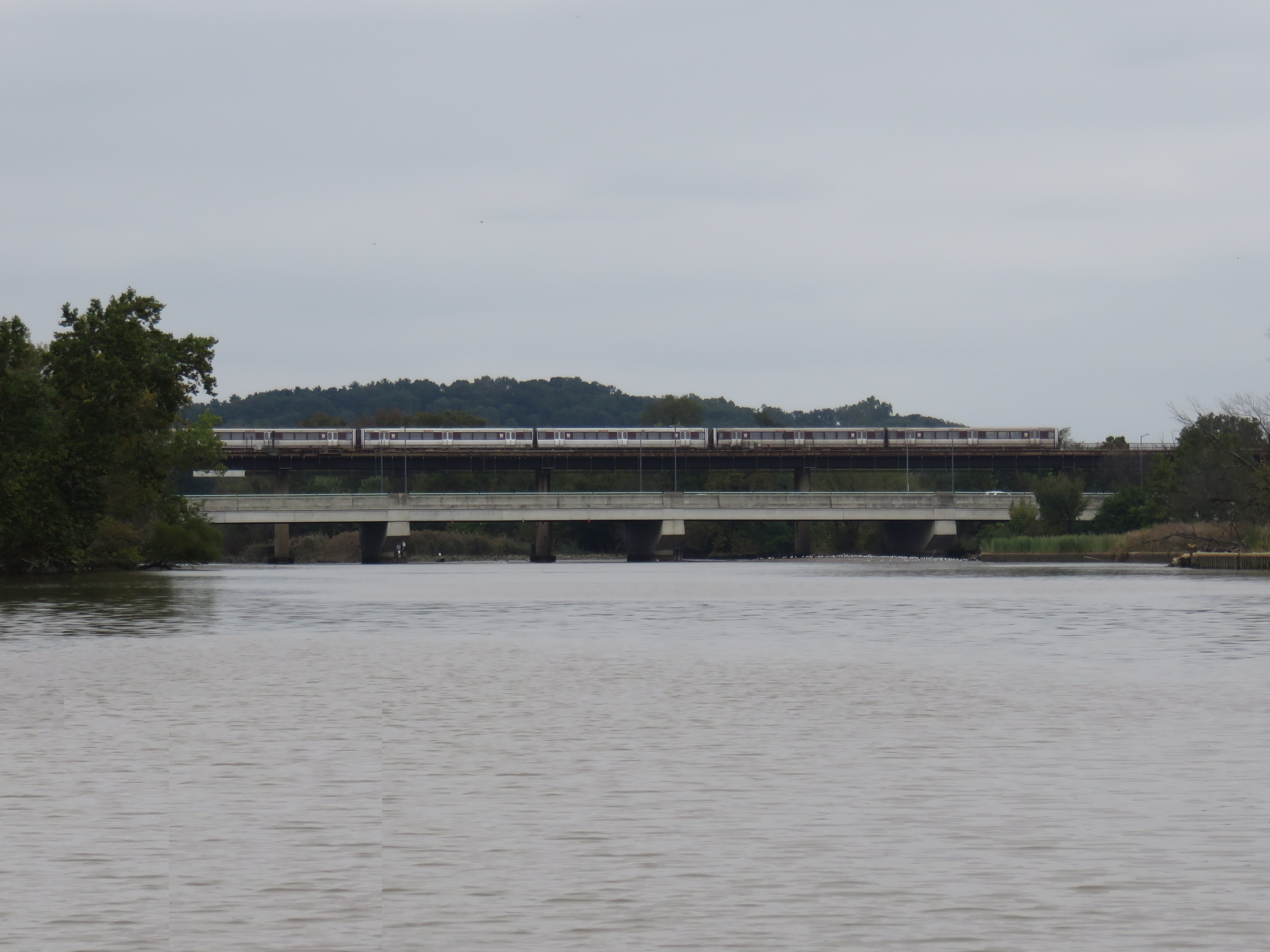
- The Ethel Kennedy Bridge from the south in October 2018, with the Metro bridge visible behind and above it
- Coordinates: 38.897195°N 76.963649°W
- Carries: Motor vehicles, pedestrians
- Crosses: Anacostia River, Kingman Island
- Locale: Washington, D.C., U.S.
- Other name: Benning Road Bridge
- Named for: Ethel Kennedy
- Owner: District Department of Transportation
- Preceded by: Washington Metro bridge
- Followed by: Whitney Young Memorial Bridge

Characteristics
- Design: Plate girder bridge
- Total length: 548 feet (167 m)
- No. of spans: 5

History
- Construction start: 2002
- Construction end: 2004

Statistics
- Daily traffic: 68,400 vehicles per day (1990)
- Toll: Free both ways

Location
- Interactive map of Ethel Kennedy Bridge

The Ethel Kennedy Bridge is a beam bridge built in 2004 that carries Benning Road over the Anacostia River in Washington, D.C. It is an eight-lane bridge with pedestrian lanes on both sides. A separate Washington Metro bridge carrying the Blue, Orange and Silver lines crosses over the bridge near its western terminus, and parallels the bridge on the north. A third bridge in the area carries Benning Road over Kingman Lake.

== History ==
=== Stoddert's Bridge ===
In 1797, the state of Maryland (which then controlled the area which would later become the District of Columbia) issued a charter to Benjamin Stoddert, Thomas Law, and John Templeman to build a bridge across the Anacostia River. Stoddert owned land (known as "Long Meadows") on the eastern shore of the Anacostia River, and a bridge would have helped him develop him land. The right to build a bridge was not exercised until 1805, when Chain Bridge was swept away during floods. Stoddert then formed the Anacostia Bridge Co., and that same year erected a $20,000 wooden bridge known as Stoddert's Bridge in this location. In the 1790s, "Captain" William Benning came from Virginia and purchased 330 acres (1.3 km^{2}) of land on the western end of Stoddert's Bridge. The site was one of the first crossings over the Anacostia River. The bridge and "Benning's Road" were important eastern routes in and out of the District.

By 1814, the bridge—now also known as "Upper Bridge"—was in disrepair. During the War of 1812, the U.S. military commander of the Military District of Washington burned Stoddert's Bridge in an attempt to stop the British from invading the city of Washington. On March 3, 1815, the United States Congress passed legislation reimbursing the Anacostia Bridge Co. for the destruction of its bridge.

=== Ewell's Bridge ===
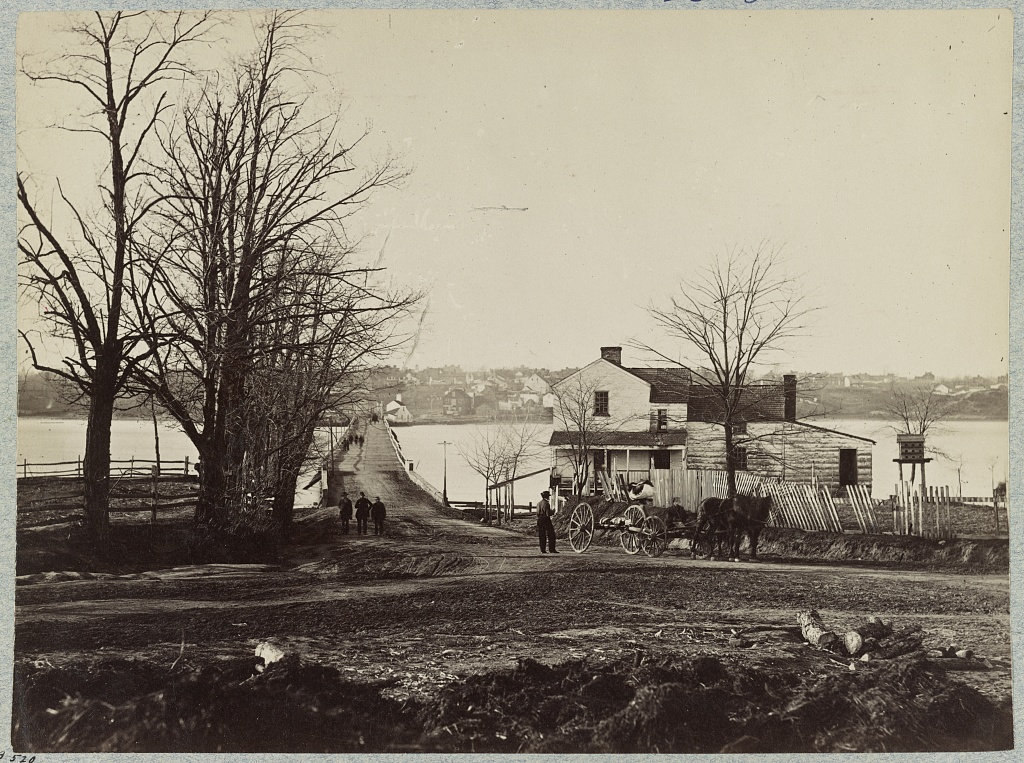
The Bridge across the Eastern Branch (Anacostia River) in April 1865

The bridge was rebuilt in 1815 by Dr. Thomas Ewell, who renamed it Ewell's Bridge (although it was also known as the "Anacostia Bridge"). In 1825, Ewell sold the bridge to Benning, who renamed it Benning's Bridge.

=== Benning's Bridge ===
Benning built a new bridge at the site in the 1830s (although not all sources agree on the exact date).

After a major flood in 1840, the bridge was repaired. It was purchased in August 1848 by the federal government and the toll removed. In disrepair due to the large amount of traffic over the span, it was almost completely rebuilt in 1868.

=== 1892 Bridge ===
Ewell's Bridge was replaced with a steel bridge in 1892.

=== Benning Road Bridge ===
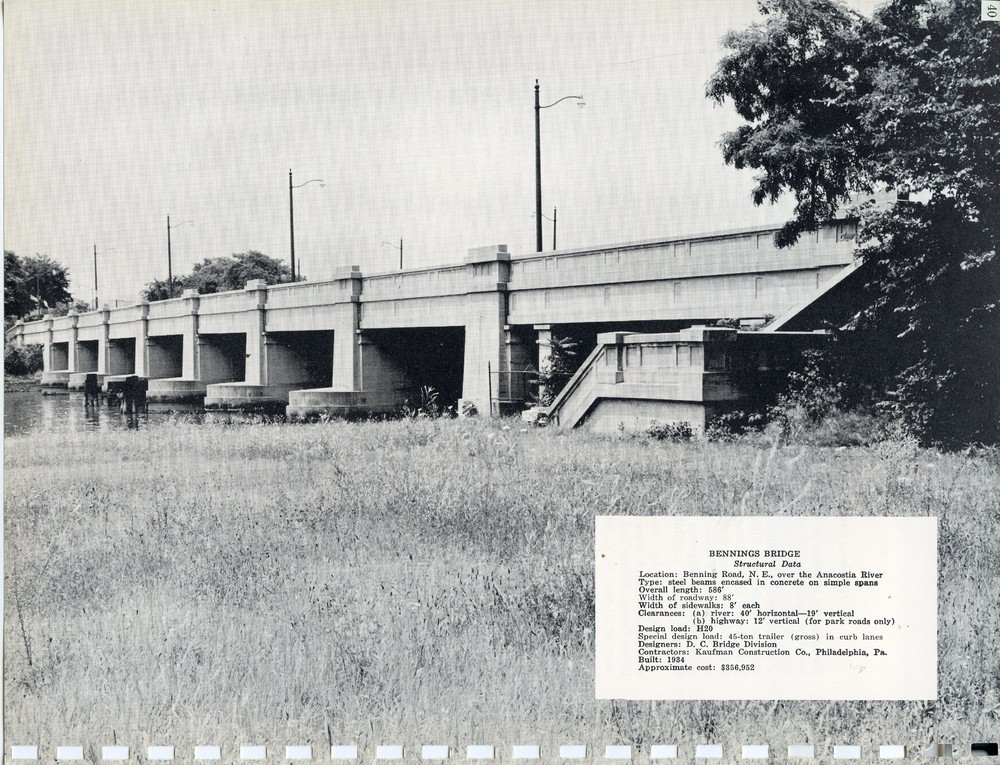
Photo of the Benning Road Bridge constructed in 1934

Work on a replacement to that bridge began in January 1933 and cost $450,000 at the time. The 8-span bridge made of steel beams encased in concrete on simple spans opened on December 18, 1934. It was 586 feet long, 106 feet wide with 8' sidewalks on each side. In 1975, the west bound deck was replaced.

=== Ethel Kennedy Bridge ===
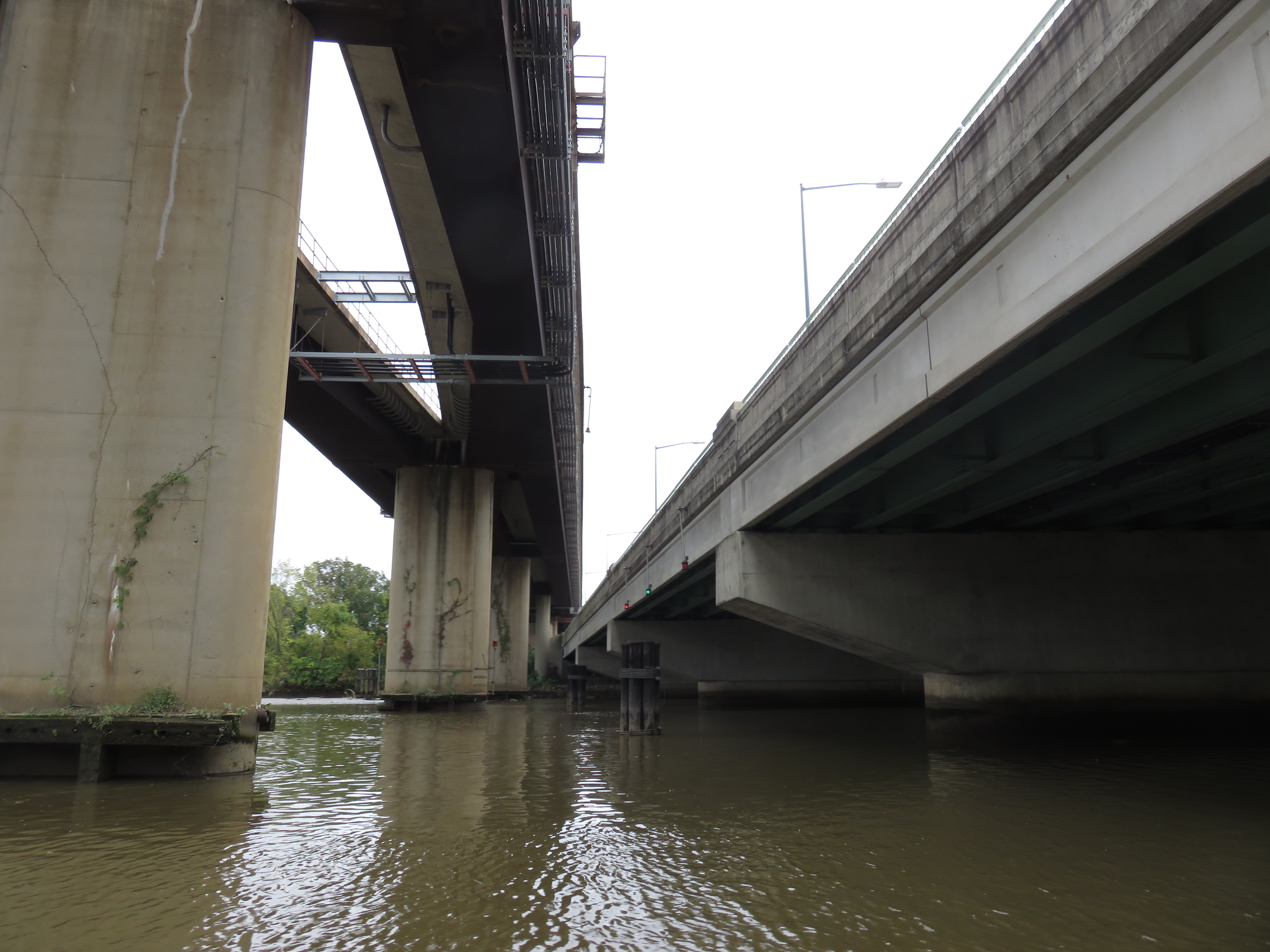
The Metro and road bridges side-by-side

In the late 1990s an analysis of the existing bridge showed that the bridge was unsuitable for rehabilitation and that it needed to be replaced. The replacement was broken into two bridges, with one over Kingman Lake and the other over the Anacostia. The bridge over Kingman Lake was built in 2000.

In 2002-2003, the Benning Road Reconstruction Project replaced the 586-foot bridge built in 1934 with a 548-foot, 8-lane, 5-span, continuous, multi-girder bridge with steel elements masked by concrete panels to closely resemble the 1934 span. The new bridge, like the one it replaced, carries water, gas, electricity and phone lines. It also included wide sidewalks, a new pedestrian gateway to Kingman Island and connections to the RiverParks on both sides of the river.

In 2008, the District Council voted to rename the Benning Road Bridge after Ethel Kennedy, the widow of the late Robert F. Kennedy, for whom a nearby stadium was named. In a May 20, 2014, ceremony, the bridge was officially renamed the Ethel Kennedy Bridge to honor her for her devotion to many social and environmental causes during her later years, especially in the neighborhoods along and near the Anacostia River.

The Bridge was inspected by the District of Columbia Department of Transportation (DDOT) in 2014, and found to be structurally sound.
