= List of railroads in Washington, D.C. =

The following railroads operate or once operated in the District of Columbia.

== Current railroads ==
=== Freight ===
- CSX Transportation (CSXT)

=== Passenger ===
- Amtrak (AMTK)

=== Commuter ===
- MARC Train (MARC)
- Virginia Railway Express (VREX)
- Washington Metro

== Defunct railroads ==
Name	Reporting mark	System (Note: This is one or more of the Class I railroads that the railroad became part of, if any.)	From	To	Successor	Notes
Alexandria and Fredericksburg Railway		RF&P	1872	1890	Baltimore and Potomac Railroad	
Alexandria and Washington Railroad		RF&P	1854	1872	Alexandria and Fredericksburg Railway	
Baltimore and Ohio Railroad	B&O, BO	B&O	1831	1987	Chesapeake and Ohio Railway	
Baltimore and Potomac Railroad		PRR	1867	1902	Philadelphia, Baltimore and Washington Railroad	
Chesapeake Beach Railway			1896	1935	East Washington Railway	
Chesapeake and Ohio Railway	C&O, CO	C&O	1891	1987	CSX Transportation	
Consolidated Rail Corporation	CR		1976	1999	CSX Transportation/Norfolk Southern Railway	
DC Streetcar			2016	2026	N/A	
East Washington Railway			1935	1976	N/A	
Georgetown Barge, Dock, Elevator and Railway Company		B&O	1888	1972	Baltimore and Ohio Railroad	
Orange, Alexandria and Manassas Railroad		SOU	1872	1872	Virginia and North Carolina Railroad	
Penn Central Transportation Company	PC		1968	1976	Consolidated Rail Corporation	
Pennsylvania Railroad	PRR	PRR	1918	1968	Penn Central Transportation Company	
Philadelphia, Baltimore and Washington Railroad		PRR	1902	1976	Consolidated Rail Corporation	
Philadelphia, Wilmington and Baltimore Railroad		PRR	1891	1902	Philadelphia, Baltimore and Washington Railroad	
Richmond and Danville Railroad		SOU	1886	1894	Southern Railway	
Richmond, Fredericksburg and Potomac Railroad	RF&P, RFP	RF&P	1920	1991	Richmond, Fredericksburg and Potomac Railway	
Richmond, Fredericksburg and Potomac Railway	RFP		1991			Still exists as a subsidiary of CSX Transportation
Southern Railway	SOU	SOU	1894	1990	Norfolk Southern Railway	
Southern Maryland Railroad			1882	1886	Washington and Potomac Railroad	
Virginia Midland Railway		SOU	1880	1886	Richmond and Danville Railroad	
Virginia and North Carolina Railroad		SOU	1872	1873	Washington City, Virginia Midland and Great Southern Railway	
Washington, Alexandria and Georgetown Railroad		RF&P	1862	1868	Alexandria and Washington Railroad	
Washington City and Point Lookout Railroad		B&O	1873	1874	Baltimore and Ohio Railroad	
Washington City, Virginia Midland and Great Southern Railway		SOU	1873	1880	Virginia Midland Railway	
Washington and Potomac Railroad			1886	1900	Washington, Potomac and Chesapeake Railroad	
Washington, Potomac and Chesapeake Railroad			1901	1910	Washington, Potomac and Chesapeake Railway	
Washington, Potomac and Chesapeake Railway			1910	1918	Chesapeake Beach Railway	
Washington Southern Railway	WSN	RF&P	1901	1920	Richmond, Fredericksburg and Potomac Railroad	
Washington Terminal Company	WATC	B&O/ PRR	1901			Still exists as a subsidiary of the National Railroad Passenger Corporation (Amtrak)
Washington and Western Maryland Railroad		B&O	1889	1985	N/A	

=== Electric ===
- Alexandria, Barcroft and Washington Transit Company
- Anacostia and Potomac River Railroad
- Baltimore and Ocean City Railway
- Baltimore and Washington Transit Company
- Brightwood Railway
- Capital Traction Company
- Capital Transit Company
- Capitol, North O Street and South Washington Railway
- City and Suburban Railway
- Columbia Railway
- Georgetown and Tennallytown Railway
- Great Falls and Old Dominion Railroad
- Metropolitan Railroad
- Rock Creek Railway
- Tennallytown and Rockville Railroad
- Washington and Georgetown Railroad
- Washington and Glen Echo Railroad
- Washington and Great Falls Electric Railway
- Washington and Old Dominion Railway
- Washington and Rockville Railway
- Washington, Baltimore and Annapolis Electric Railroad
- Washington, Baltimore and Annapolis Electric Railway
- Washington, Berwyn and Laurel Electric Railway
- Washington Interurban Railway
- Washington Railway and Electric Company
- Washington, Spa Springs and Gretta Railroad
- Washington Traction and Electric Company
- Washington–Virginia Railway
- Washington, Woodside and Forest Glen Railway and Power Company
