= List of Washington railroads =

List of Washington railroads may refer to:

- List of Washington (state) railroads
- List of Washington, D.C., railroads
