= Streetcars in Washington, D.C. =

Streetcars that existed in Washington until 1962

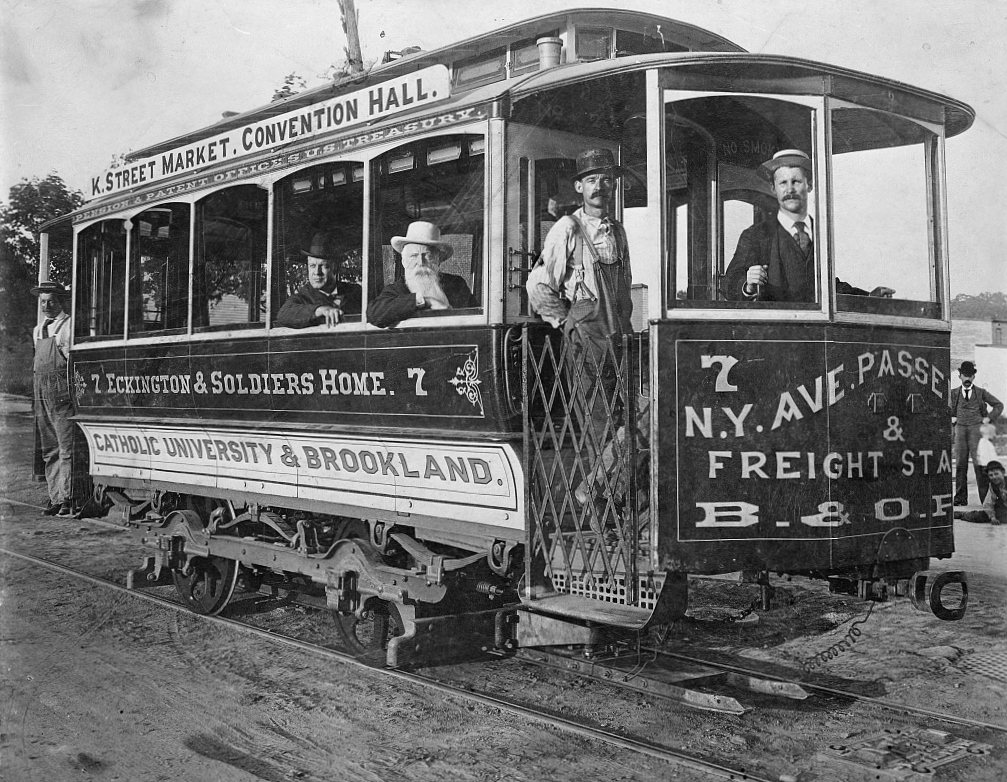
- A Washington, D.C., streetcar, c. 1890

Overview
- Transit type: Streetcar
- Number of lines: in 1946: 17 in 1958: 15

Operation
- Began operation: July 29, 1862 (horsecars); April 12, 1890 (cable); October 17, 1888 (electric)
- Ended operation: April 1900 (horsecars); July 22, 1899 (cable); January 28, 1962 (electric)
- Operator: Capital Transit Company

Technical
- Track gauge: 4 ft 8 1/2 in (1,435 mm) standard gauge
- Electrification: Overhead line, 600 V DC

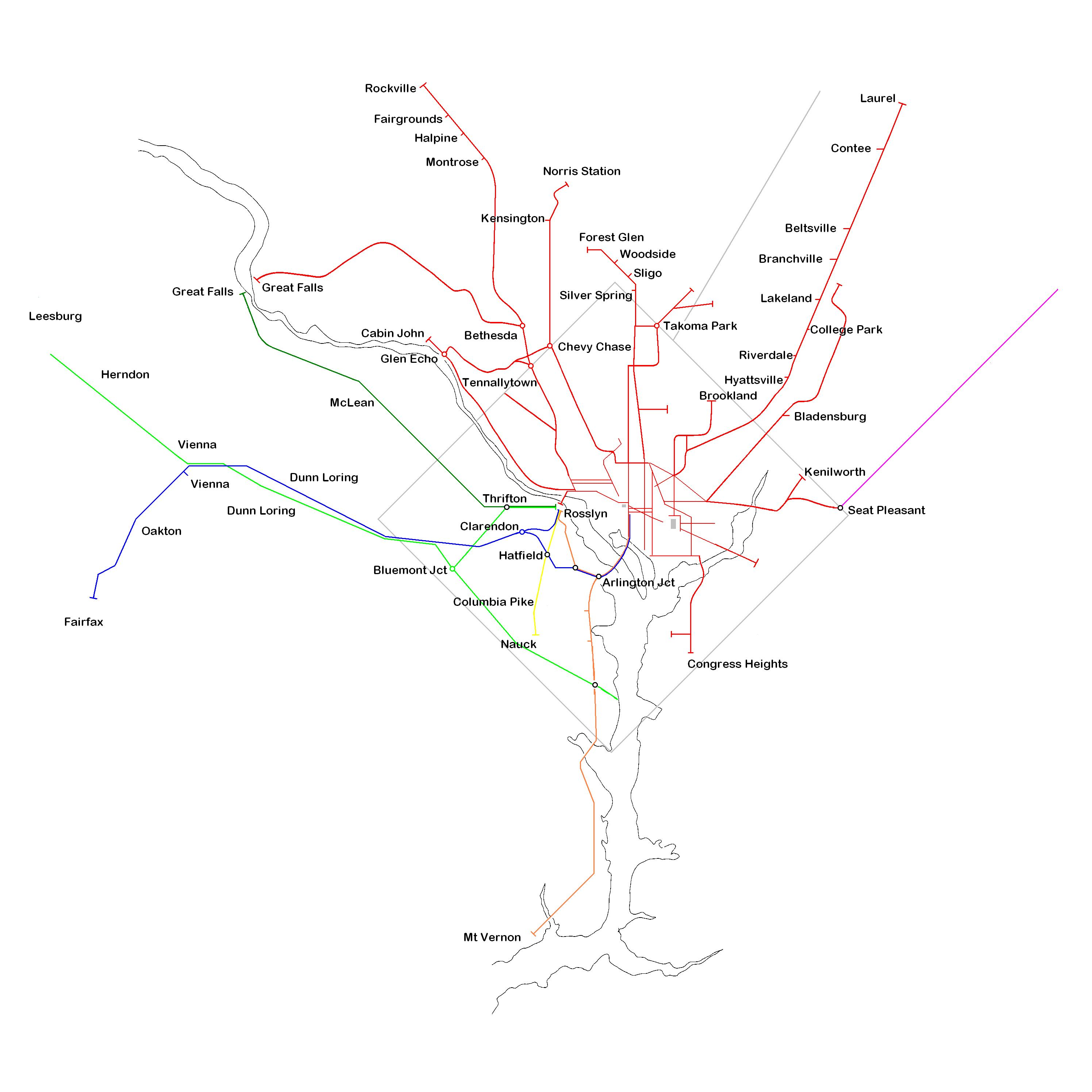
Map of Washington, D.C.'s streetcar lines

Streetcars in Washington, D.C. transported people across the city and region from 1862 until 1962.

The first streetcars in Washington, D.C., were horse-drawn and carried people short distances on flat terrain. After brief experiments with cable cars, the late-19th-century introduction of electric streetcars opened development of the hilly terrain north of the old city and in Anacostia into streetcar suburbs. The extension of several of the lines into Maryland and of two Virginia lines across the Potomac River into the District helped expand the city's dense downtown core into today's Washington metropolitan area.

By 1901, a series of mergers dubbed the "Great Streetcar Consolidation" had gathered most local transit firms into two major companies: Capital Traction Company and Washington Railway and Electric Company. In 1933, a second consolidation brought all streetcars under one company, Capital Transit.

Over the next decades, the streetcar system shrank amid the growing usage of the automobile and pressure to switch to buses. After a strike in 1955, the company changed ownership and became D.C. Transit, with explicit instructions to switch to buses. The system was dismantled in the early 1960s; the last revenue streetcar ran on January 28, 1962.

Today, some streetcars, car barns, trackage, stations, and rights-of-way exist in various states of usage. In the Georgetown neighborhood, remnants of tracks and conduit remain visible in the middle of O and P Streets NW between 33rd and 35th Streets NW, and near an M Street door of the Georgetown Car Barn.

== History ==
=== Early transit in Washington ===
Public transportation began in Washington, D.C., almost as soon as the city was founded. In May 1800, two-horse stage coaches began running twice daily from Bridge and High Streets NW (now Wisconsin Avenue and M Street NW) in Georgetown by way of M Street NW and Pennsylvania Avenue NW/SE to William Tunnicliff's Tavern at the site now occupied by the Supreme Court Building. Service ended soon after it began.

The next attempt at public transit arrived in the spring of 1830, when Gilbert Vanderwerken's Omnibuses, horse-drawn wagons, began running from Georgetown to the Navy Yard. The company maintained stables on M Street, NW. These lines were later extended down 11th Street SE to the waterfront and up 7th Street NW to L Street NW. Vanderwerken's success attracted competitors, who added new lines, but by 1854, all omnibuses had come under the control of two companies, "The Union Line" and "The Citizen's Line." In 1860, these two merged under the control of Vanderwerken and continued to operate until they were run out of business by the next new technology: streetcars.

=== Horse-drawn streetcars ===
==== Washington and Georgetown Railroad ====
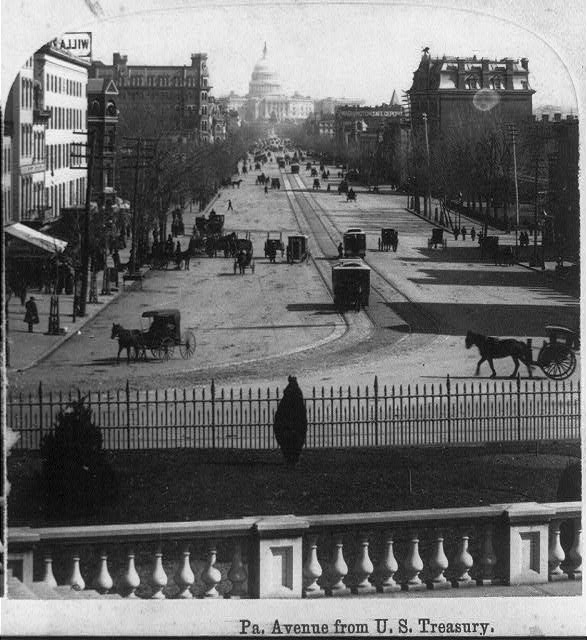
Horsecars on Pennsylvania Avenue NW, c. 1880

Streetcars began operation in New York City along the Bowery in 1832, but the technology did not really become popular until 1852, when Alphonse Loubat invented a side-bearing rail that could be laid flush with the street surface, allowing the first horse-drawn streetcar lines. The technology began to spread and on May 17, 1862, the first Washington, D.C., streetcar company, the Washington and Georgetown Railroad was incorporated. The company ran the first streetcar in Washington, D.C., from the Capitol to the State Department (then housed at the current Treasury Building) starting on July 29, 1862. It expanded to full operations from the Navy Yard to Georgetown on October 2, 1862. Another line opened on November 15, 1862. It was built along 7th Street NW from N Street NW to the Potomac River and expanded to the Arsenal (now Fort McNair) in 1875. A third line ran down 14th Street NW from Boundary Street NW (now Florida Avenue) to the Treasury Building. In 1863 the 7th Street line was extended north to Boundary Street NW.

==== Metropolitan Railroad ====
The Washington and Georgetown's monopoly didn't last long. On July 1, 1864, a second streetcar company, the Metropolitan Railroad, was incorporated. It opened lines from the Capitol to the War Department along H Street NW.

In 1872, the railroad built a line on 9th Street NW and purchased the Union Railroad (chartered on January 19, 1872). It used the Union's charter to expand into Georgetown. In 1873, it purchased the Boundary and Silver Spring Railway (chartered on January 19, 1872) and used its charter to build north on what is now Georgia Avenue. In June 1874, it absorbed the Connecticut Avenue and Park Railway (chartered on July 13, 1868; operations started in April 1873) and its line on Connecticut Avenue from the White House to Boundary Avenue. By 1888, it had built additional lines down 4th Street NW/SW to P Street SW, and on East Capitol Street to 9th Street.

==== Columbia Railway ====
Chartered by Congress on May 24, 1870 and beginning operations the same year, the Columbia Railway was the city's third horse car operator. It ran from the Treasury Building along H Street NW/NE to the city boundary at 15th Street NE. The company built a car barn and stable on the east side of 15th Street just south of H Street at the eastern end of the line.

==== Anacostia and Potomac River Railroad ====
The Anacostia and Potomac River Railroad was chartered on May 5, 1870. It received Congressional approval on February 18, 1875, and it was built that year. The streetcars traveled from the Arsenal and crossed the Navy Yard Bridge to Uniontown (now Historic Anacostia) to Nichols Avenue SE (now Martin Luther King Avenue) and V Street SE, where a car barn and stables were maintained by the company. In 1888, the Anacostia and Potomac River expanded from the Navy Yard to Congressional Cemetery, and past Garfield Park to the Center Market (now the National Archives) in downtown. It also expanded up Nichols Avenue past the Government Hospital for the Insane (now St. Elizabeths Hospital).

==== Capitol, North O Street and South Washington Railway ====
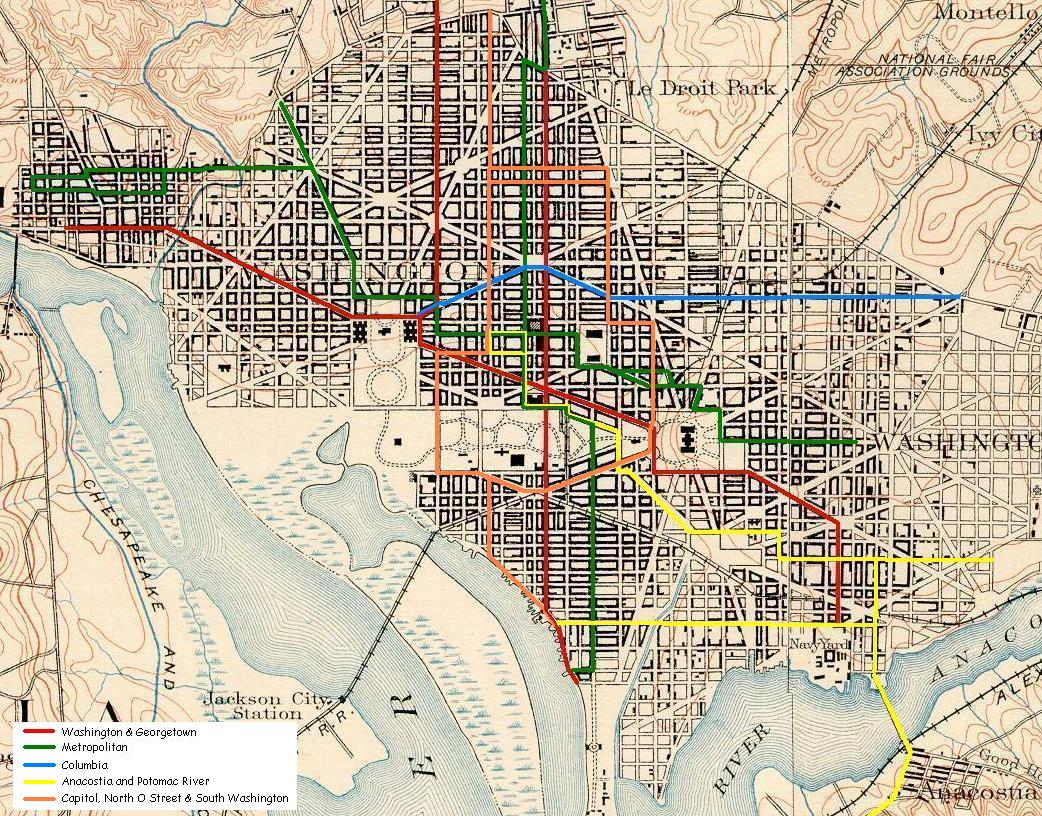
1888 map of the Washington, D.C. streetcar system, just before cable and electrical power began to replace horsecars

The last streetcar company to begin operation during the horsecar era was the Capitol, North O Street and South Washington Railway. It was incorporated on March 3, 1875, and began operation later that year. It ran on a circular route around downtown D.C. A track on P Street NW was added in 1876. In 1881, the route was extended north and south on 11th Street West and tracks were rerouted across the Mall. It changed its name to the Belt Railway on February 18, 1893.

==== Horse-drawn chariots and the Herdic Phaeton Company ====
During this time, streetcars competed with numerous horse-drawn chariot companies. Starting on March 5, 1877, the date of President Hayes' inauguration, single-horse carriages began running on a route roughly parallel to the Washington and Georgetown's Pennsylvania Avenue route. After three years, streetcars forced the chariots out of business.

This was followed almost immediately by the Herdic Phaeton Company. The electric streetcar, however, was too much for the company to compete with and when its principal stockholder died in 1896, it ceased operations.

After the Herdic Company went under, the Metropolitan Coach Company began running horse-drawn coaches in conjunction with the Metropolitan Railroad, carrying passengers from 16th and T Streets NW to 22nd and G Streets NW. It began operations on May 1, 1897, with a car barn at 1914 E Street NW. In 1904, it became its own corporation.

=== The switch to electric power ===
Horsecars, though an improvement over horse-drawn wagons, were slow, dirty and inefficient. Horses needed to be housed and fed, created large amounts of waste, had difficulty climbing hills and were difficult to dispose of. Early horsecar companies soon began looking for alternative means of motive power. For example, the Washington and Georgetown experimented with a steam motor car in the 1870s and 1880s which was run on Pennsylvania Avenue NW near the Capitol several times, but was never placed in permanent use.

On February 2, 1888, the first successful electric streetcar system in the United States began to operate in Richmond, Virginia. The Richmond Union Passenger Railway was the result of five years of work by Frank Sprague, an 1878 Naval Academy graduate who had resigned his commission to work for Thomas Edison. Richmond's example drew intense interest from many cities, including Washington.

Tracks and underground conduit system being repaired at 14th & G Streets, NW, July 1941

On March 2, 1889, the District's government authorized every streetcar company in Washington to switch from horse power to underground cable or to electricity provided by battery or underground wire. At least two D.C. streetcar companies would install cable mechanisms at great expense only to switch to electric power.

Others moved straight to electrically powered trolleys. But the editor of the Washington Star newspaper led a successful crusade against the use of overhead wires strung along streets to transmit electricity from steam-driven power stations to the streetcars themselves. Instead of this method, common in other cities but which the editor found aesthetically displeasing, D.C. would adopt a far more expensive and finicky system involving an electrical conduit laid between rails in the street.

In 1890, the District authorized companies to sell stock to pay for the upgrades. In 1892, one-horse cars were banned within the city, and by 1894 Congress began requiring companies to switch to something other than horse power.

==== First wave: 1888 ====
By 1888, Washington was expanding north of Boundary Street NW into the hills of Washington Heights and Petworth. (The street would be renamed Florida Avenue in 1890 after landowner complained that the "boundary" moniker was depressing the value of their land.) Climbing the hills to the new parts of the city was difficult for horses, but electric streetcars could do it easily. In the year after the successful demonstration of the Richmond streetcar, four electric streetcar companies were incorporated in Washington, D.C.

===== Eckington and Soldiers' Home Railway =====
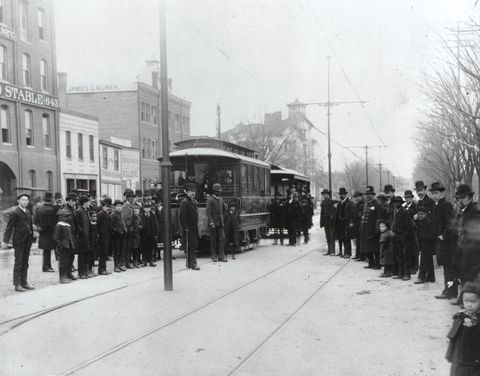
Eckington and Soldiers’ Home Railway's opening day at the terminus at Seventh Street and New York Avenue NW

The first of these new electric streetcar companies was the Eckington and Soldiers' Home Railway, chartered on June 19, 1888, and opened for operations on October 17. Its tracks started at 7th Street and New York Avenue NW, east of Mount Vernon Square, and traveled 2.5 miles to the Eckington Car Barn at 4th and T Streets NE via Boundary Street NE, Eckington Place NE, R Street NE, 3rd Street NE and T Street NE.

Another line ran up 4th Street NE to Michigan Avenue NE. A one-week pass cost $1.25. In 1889, the line was extended along T Street NE, 2nd Street NE and V Street NE to Glenwood Cemetery, but the extension proved unprofitable and was closed in 1894.

At the same time, the company built an extension was along Michigan Avenue NE to the Baltimore and Ohio Railroad's Metropolitan Branch line. In 1895, the E&S removed its overhead trolley lines in accordance with its charter and attempted to replace them with batteries. These proved too costly and the company replaced them with horses in the central city.

In 1896, Congress directed the Eckington and Soldier's Home to try compressed air motors and to substitute underground electric power for all its horse and overhead trolley lines in the city. The compressed-air motors were a failure; three years later, the company would switch to standard underground electric power conduit.

===== Rock Creek Railway =====
The second electric streetcar company was the Rock Creek Railway, the project of developers who sought to build streetcar suburbs in far Northwest D.C. and Maryland. It was incorporated in 1888 and started operations in 1890 on two blocks of the newly-renamed Florida Avenue east of Connecticut Avenue. After completing a bridge over Rock Creek at Calvert Street on July 21, 1891, the line was extended through Adams Morgan, then northward on a three-mile extension of Connecticut to Chevy Chase Lake in Maryland. In 1893, a line was added through Cardozo/Shaw to 7th Street NW.

===== Georgetown and Tenleytown =====
The third D.C. streetcar company to incorporate in 1888 was the Georgetown and Tennallytown Railway, the southernmost of a trio of streetcar companies that would eventually provide service from Georgetown to Rockville, Maryland. Chartered on August 22, 1888, the G&T began operations in 1890 on a route that ran up from M Street NW up 32nd Street NW and then onto the Georgetown and Rockville Road (now Wisconsin Avenue NW) to the extant village of Tenleytown. That same year, the Tennallytown and Rockville Railway received its charter—the fourth and final of 1888—and began building tracks from the G&T's northern terminus to today's D.C. neighborhood of Friendship Heights and the Maryland state line. Finally, the Washington and Rockville Electric Railway was incorporated in 1897 to extend the tracks into Maryland line and onward to Bethesda and Rockville. Controlling interest in the companies was obtained first by the Washington Traction and Electric Company, then in 1902 by the Washington Railway and Electric Company. Streetcar service in Maryland was replaced with buses in 1935.

==== Second wave: 1892-1905 ====
In the summer of 1892, two more streetcar companies that aimed to operate in D.C. and Maryland were incorporated by acts of Congress, and others followed in later years.

===== Washington and Great Falls =====
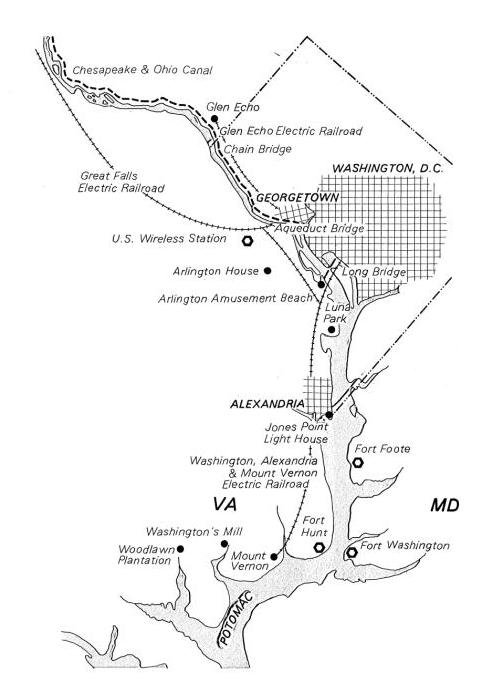
Diagram of 1915 electric railroad routes near the later routes of the George Washington Memorial Parkway, showing the Washington and Great Falls Electric Railway, the Great Falls division of the Washington and Old Dominion Railway, the Washington-Mount Vernon line, and the East Arlington Branch of the Washington-Virginia Railway.

Congress approved the Washington and Great Falls Electric Railway Company's charter on July 28, 1892, permitting the company to build an electric streetcar line from Georgetown to Cabin John, Maryland. Its tracks reached the District–Maryland line on September 28, 1895, and Cabin John in 1897.

===== Maryland and Washington Railway =====
Congress approved the Maryland and Washington Railway's charter on August 1, 1892. That railroad's tracks ran on Rhode Island Avenue NE from 4th Street NE reaching what is now Mount Rainier on the Maryland line in 1897. At its southern terminus, it connected to the Eckington and Soldier's Home Railway.

===== Baltimore and Washington =====
The Baltimore and Washington Transit Company was incorporated before 1894, with authorization to run from the District of Columbia across Maryland to the Pennsylvania border. On June 8, 1896, it was given permission to enter the District of Columbia and connect to the spur of the Brightwood line that ran on Butternut St NW. In 1897, the railroad began construction on a line, known locally as the Dinky Line, that began at the end of the Brightwood spur at 4th and Butternut Streets NW, traveled south on 4th Street NW to Aspen Street NW and then east on Aspen Street NW and Laurel Street NW into Maryland.

Between 1903 and 1917, a line was added running south on 3rd St NW and west on Kennedy St NW to Colorado Avenue where it connected to Capital Traction's 14th Street line. On March 14, 1914, it changed its name to the Washington and Maryland Railway.

===== Capital Railway =====
The first electric streetcar to operate in Anacostia was the Capital Railway. It was incorporated by Colonel Arthur Emmett Randle on March 2, 1895, to serve Congress Heights. It was to run from Shepherds Ferry along the Potomac and across the Navy Yard Bridge to M Street SE.

A second line would run along Good Hope Road SE to the District boundary. The line was built during the Panic of 1896 despite 18 months of opposition from the Anacostia and Potomac River. In 1897 it experimented with the "Brown System", which used magnets in boxes to relay power instead of overhead or underground lines, and with double trolley lines over the Navy Yard Bridge. Both were failures.

By 1898, the streetcar line ran along Nichols Avenue SE to Congress Heights, ending at Upsal Street SE. At the same time the Capital Railway was incorporated, the Washington and Marlboro Electric Railway was chartered to run trains across the Anacostia River through southeast Anacostia to the District boundary at Suitland Road and from there to Upper Marlboro, but it never laid any track.

===== East Washington Heights =====
The East Washington Heights Traction Railroad was incorporated on June 18, 1898. By 1903 it ran from the Capitol along Pennsylvania Avenue SE to Barney Circle, and by 1908, it went across the bridge to Randle Highlands (now known as Twining) as far as 27th St SE. By 1917 it had been extended out Pennsylvania Avenue past 33rd Street SE., but the company ceased operations by 1923.

===== Washington, Spa Spring, and Gretta =====
On July 5, 1892, the District of Columbia Suburban Railway was incorporated to run streetcars on Bladensburg Road NE from the Columbia Railroad tracks on H Street NE to the Maryland line and from Brookland to Florida Avenue NE. It was never built.

But the route was reused by the final streetcar company to form in D.C.: the Washington, Spa Spring, and Gretta Railroad. It was chartered by the state of Maryland on February 13, 1905, and authorized to enter the District on February 18, 1907. Construction began by March 22, 1908.

In 1910, the company began running cars along a single track from a modest waiting station and car barn near 15th Street NE and H Street NE along Bladensburg Road NE to Bladensburg.

Although initially planned to go as far as Gettysburg, Pennsylvania, the line never ran further than an extension to Berwyn Heights, Maryland. The route was intended to promote development of company-owned land near the tracks, but it never successfully competed with established rail lines in the same area. Noting its diminished ambitions, it became the Washington Interurban Railway on October 12, 1912, and changed the Railway to Railroad in 1919.

==== Conversions to electric power ====
===== Brightwood Railway Company =====
On October 18, 1888, the day after the Eckington and Soldier's Home began operation, Congress authorized the Brightwood Railway Company to electrify the Metropolitan's streetcar line on Seventh Street Extended NW or Brightwood Avenue NW (now known as Georgia Avenue NW) and to extend it to the District boundary at Silver Spring. In 1890, they bought the former Boundary and Silver Spring line from the Metropolitan, but continued to operate it as a horse line. In 1892 it was ordered by Congress to switch to overhead electrical power and complete the line. The next year, the streetcar tracks reached Takoma Park via a spur along Butternut Street NW to 4th Street NW. In 1898, the Brightwood was ordered to switch to underground electric power or have its charter revoked.

===== Washington and Georgetown =====
After the March 2, 1889, D.C. law passed, the Washington and Georgetown began installing an underground cable system. Their 7th Street line switched to cable car on April 12, 1890. The rest of the system switched to cable by August 18, 1892. In 1892, they extended their track along 14th to Park Road NW.

===== Metropolitan =====
The Metropolitan experimented with batteries in 1890 but found them unsatisfactory. On August 2, 1894, Congress ordered the Metropolitan to switch to underground electrical power. It complied, installing the underground sliding shoe on the north–south line in January 1895. The Metropolitan switched the rest of the system to electric power on July 7, 1896. In 1895, the Metropolitan built a streetcar barn near the Arsenal and a loop in Georgetown to connect it to the Georgetown Car Barn. In 1896, it extended service along East Capitol Street and built the East Capitol Street Car Barn. It also extended its service from Connecticut Avenue to Mount Pleasant, running up Columbia Avenue and Mount Pleasant Road to Park Road.

===== Columbia =====
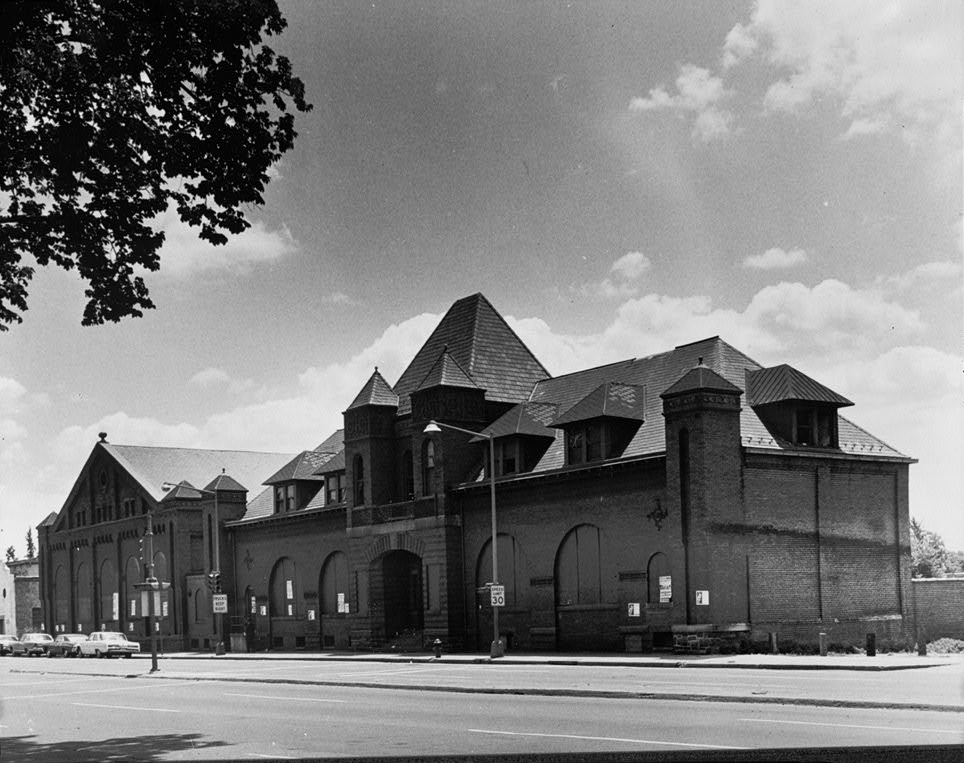
Columbia Railway Company Car Barns at 15th Street and Benning Road NE. The barn was built in 1895, converted to electric power in 1899, to a bus barn in 1942, and demolished in 1971.

The Columbia decided to try a cable system, the last cable car system built in the United States. They built a new cable car barn and began operating the system on March 9, 1895. It became clear that the underground electrical system was superior, so it quickly abandoned cable cars and switched to electrical power on July 22, 1899. The last cable car in the city ran the next day.

Using electricity from the power plant built to power its cable operation, the Columbia won permission in 1898 to build a line east along Benning Road NE, splitting on the east side of the Anacostia. One branch ran to Kenilworth, and the other, built in 1900, connected at Seat Pleasant with the terminus of the steam-powered Chesapeake Beach Railway.

===== Belt =====
In 1896, the Belt Railway tried out compressed air motors. The compressed air motors were a failure, and in 1899 the cars were equipped with the standard underground power system.

===== Anacostia and Potomac River =====
The Anacostia and Potomac River, the last horse-drawn streetcar in the District, switched to electricity in April 1900.

=== Virginia trolleys operating in Washington, D.C. ===
Two electric trolley companies serving Northern Virginia also operated in the District; a third received permission to do so, but never did.

The Washington & Arlington Railway was the first Virginia company approved to operate in Washington. It was incorporated on February 28, 1892, with the right to run a streetcar from the train station at 6th Street NW and B Street NW to Virginia across a planned new Three Sisters Bridge. It was also allotted space in the Georgetown Car Barn. The company was never able to build the new bridge, and so never operated in Washington.

The Washington, Alexandria, and Mount Vernon Electric Railway began operating between Alexandria and Mount Vernon in 1892. On August 23, 1894, it was given permission to enter the District of Columbia using a boat or barge, but never did.

The railroad completed its tracks in 1896 and began serving a waiting station at 14th Street NW and B Street NW. From the waiting station it used the Belt Line Street Railway Company's tracks on 14th Street NW to reach the Long Bridge, a combined road and rail crossing of the Potomac River. In 1906, the Long Bridge's road and streetcar tracks were moved to a truss bridge (the Highway Bridge), immediately west of the older bridge. This span was removed in 1967.

In 1902, the railroad moved its station, as the Belt Line's tracks were circling the block containing the site of a planned new District Building (now the John A. Wilson Building). The new station at 1204 N. Pennsylvania Avenue extended along 12th Street NW from Pennsylvania Avenue NW to D Street NW, near the site of the present Federal Triangle Metro station and across 12th Street from the Post Office building.

On October 17, 1910, the Washington and Arlington, by then the Washington, Arlington & Falls Church Railroad, and the Washington, Alexandria and Mount Vernon merged to form the Washington–Virginia Railway. The company had difficulty competing and in 1924 declared bankruptcy. In 1927 the two companies were split and sold at auction. The former Washington, Arlington & Falls Church Railroad reemerged as the Arlington and Fairfax Railway and continued to serve the city on the Washington-Virginia route until January 17, 1932, when the Mt. Vernon Memorial Highway (now the George Washington Memorial Parkway) opened.

The Great Falls and Old Dominion Railroad was chartered on January 24, 1900, and authorized to enter the District on January 29, 1903. It crossed over the Aqueduct Bridge and terminated at a station immediately west of the Georgetown Car Barn. In 1912, it was incorporated into the new Washington and Old Dominion Railway and became the Great Falls Division of that company.

=== The Great Streetcar Consolidation ===
Token

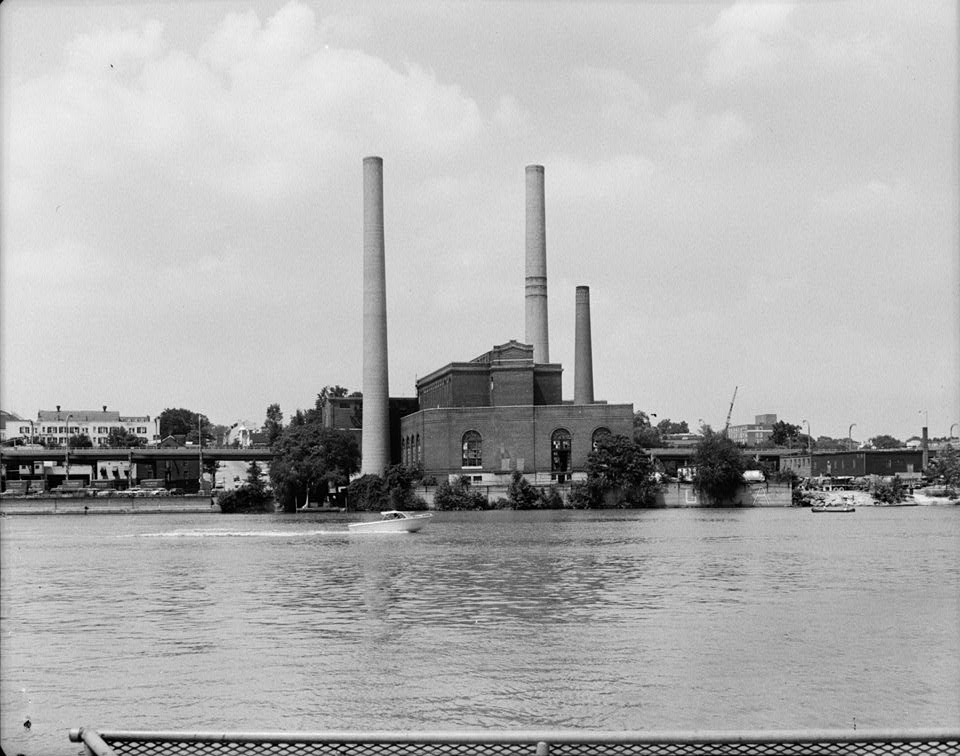
The former Capital Traction Power House on the Georgetown waterfront. Built in 1910–11, it was shut down in 1935, decommissioned in 1943, and demolished in October 1968.

By the mid-1890s, there were numerous streetcar companies operating in the city. Congress attempted to deal with this fractured transit system by requiring them to accept transfers, set standard pricing and by allowing them to use one another's track. But eventually, lawmakers settled on consolidation as the best solution.

On March 1, 1895, Congress authorized the Rock Creek to purchase the Washington and Georgetown on September 21. This consolidated Capital Traction Company replaced its cable cars with an electric system after its powerhouse at 14th and E NW burned down in 1897. The various branches switched to electric power by the end of 1898.

In 1898, the Eckington and Soldier's Home purchased the Maryland and Washington Railway and the Mount Rainier-to-Laurel Columbia and Maryland Railway; it changed its name to the City and Suburban Railway of Washington.

Also that year, the Anacostia and Potomac River bought the Belt Railway; the next year, it bought the Capital Railway.

Between 1896 and 1899, a three-person consortium purchased controlling interests in several regional streetcar companies: the Metropolitan; the Columbia; the Anacostia and Potomac River; the Georgetown and Tennallytown; the Washington, Woodside and Forest Glen; the Washington and Great Falls; and the Washington and Rockville railway companies. This consortium also gained control of the Potomac Electric Power Company and the United States Electric Lighting Company. They incorporated the Washington Traction and Electric Company on June 5, 1899, as a holding company for these interests. But the holding company had borrowed too heavily and paid too much for the subsidiaries and quickly landed in financial trouble.

To prevent transit disruption, in 1900 Congress authorized the Washington and Great Falls to acquire the stock of any and all of the railways and power companies owned by Washington Traction, which defaulted on its loans a year later. Washington and Great Falls moved in to take its place in 1902 and changed its name to the Washington Railway and Electric Company (WREC, sometimes WRECO), reincorporated as a holding company and exchanged stock in Washington Traction and Electric one for one for stock in the new company (at a discounted rate).

Not every company became a part of the WREC immediately. The City and Suburban Railway and the Georgetown and Tennallytown operated as subsidiaries of the WREC until 1926, when it purchased the remainder of their stock.

During this time, the streetcar companies continued to expand both trackage and service. The American Sight-Seeing Car and Coach Company started running tourist cars along the WREC streetcar tracks in 1902 and continued until it switched to large automobiles in 1904. In 1908, the WREC's U Street line was extended east down Florida Avenue NW/NE to 8th Street NE, and from there south down 8th Street NE/SE to the Navy Yard. Streetcars began serving to Union Station along Delaware Avenue NE in mid-1908, and cars of both Capital Traction and the WREC were serving the building along Massachusetts Avenue NE by year's end.

In 1908, the Washington, Baltimore and Annapolis Electric Railway began service from Washington to Baltimore and Annapolis. Though technically an interurban, this railway used streetcar tracks from its terminal at 15th and H Streets NE and across the Benning Road Bridge where it switched to its own tracks in Deanwood. It was the main source of transportation to Suburban Gardens, known as "the black Glen Echo", the first and only major amusement park within Washington.

The next major consolidation occurred in 1912, when the WREC purchased the controlling stock of the Anacostia and Potomac River. This left six companies operating in Washington, four of which had less than three miles of track. It also led to Congress passing the "Anti-Merger Act", prohibiting mergers without Congress' approval and establishing the Public Utilities Commission. In 1914 a failed attempt was made to have the federal government purchase all of the streetcar lines and companies. Streetcars were unionized in 1916 when local 689 of the Amalgamated Association of Street, Electric Railway and Motor Coach Employees of America won recognition after a three-day strike.

In 1916, Capital Traction took ownership of the Washington and Maryland and its 2.591 miles of track.

Further consolidation came in the form of the North American Company, a transit and public utility holding company. North American began to acquire WREC stock in 1922, gaining a controlling interest by 1928. By December 31, 1933, it owned 50.016% of the voting stock. North American tried to purchase Capital Traction, but never owned more than 2.5% of Capital Traction stock.

=== Bustitution and competition ===
By 1916, streetcar use was reaching its peak in Washington, D.C. The combined systems had over 200 miles of track, with almost 100 in the city. Passengers could travel to Great Falls, Glen Echo, Rockville, Kensington, and Laurel in Maryland; and to Mount Vernon, Alexandria, Vienna, Fairfax, Leesburg, Great Falls, and Bluemont in Virginia. World War I saw further increases in passenger traffic. But the streetcars faced increasing competition.

The first threat to the streetcars was gasoline-powered taxicabs. The taximeter, invented in 1891, combined with the combustion engine, created a new form of public transportation. The first taxicabs hit Washington streets in 1908, and their numbers grew thereafter.

Buses were the next competitors. In 1909, the Metropolitan Coach Company began to switch from horse-drawn coaches to gasoline-powered coaches. It had completed the transition by 1913, becoming a precursor to the bus companies. But it failed financially and on August 13, 1915, the company ceased operations. The first formal bus company in the nation's capital, the Washington Rapid Transit Company, was incorporated in 1921. By 1932, it was carrying 4.5% of transit customers. Two years later, the last streetcar line was built.

In 1923, three streetcar companies switched to buses. The first was the East Washington Heights, which replaced its two streetcars and one mile of track with a bus line. The Washington Interurban switched next; its tracks were removed when Bladensburg Road was repaved.

The same year, operations across the Potomac River between Rosslyn and Georgetown were handed over by the Washington and Old Dominion Railway, which had run on the decaying Aqueduct Bridge, to Capital Traction Company, running down the center of the new Key Bridge. The W&OD agreed not to vie for rights on the new bridge, and Capital Traction, which had been seeking cross-river operations, built a new terminal for the Virginia railroad next to its own new loop in Rosslyn.

In 1931, Capital Traction abandoned the decades-old service of delivering freight aboard its streetcars.

Nearly a decade after the W&OD left Washington, the Arlington and Fairfax lost the right to use the Highway Bridge. The last Arlington and Fairfax streetcar departed from 12th Street NW and D Street NW, on January 17, 1932. The Arlington and Fairfax Motor Transportation Company was established to replace the streetcar service.

=== Capital Transit Company ===
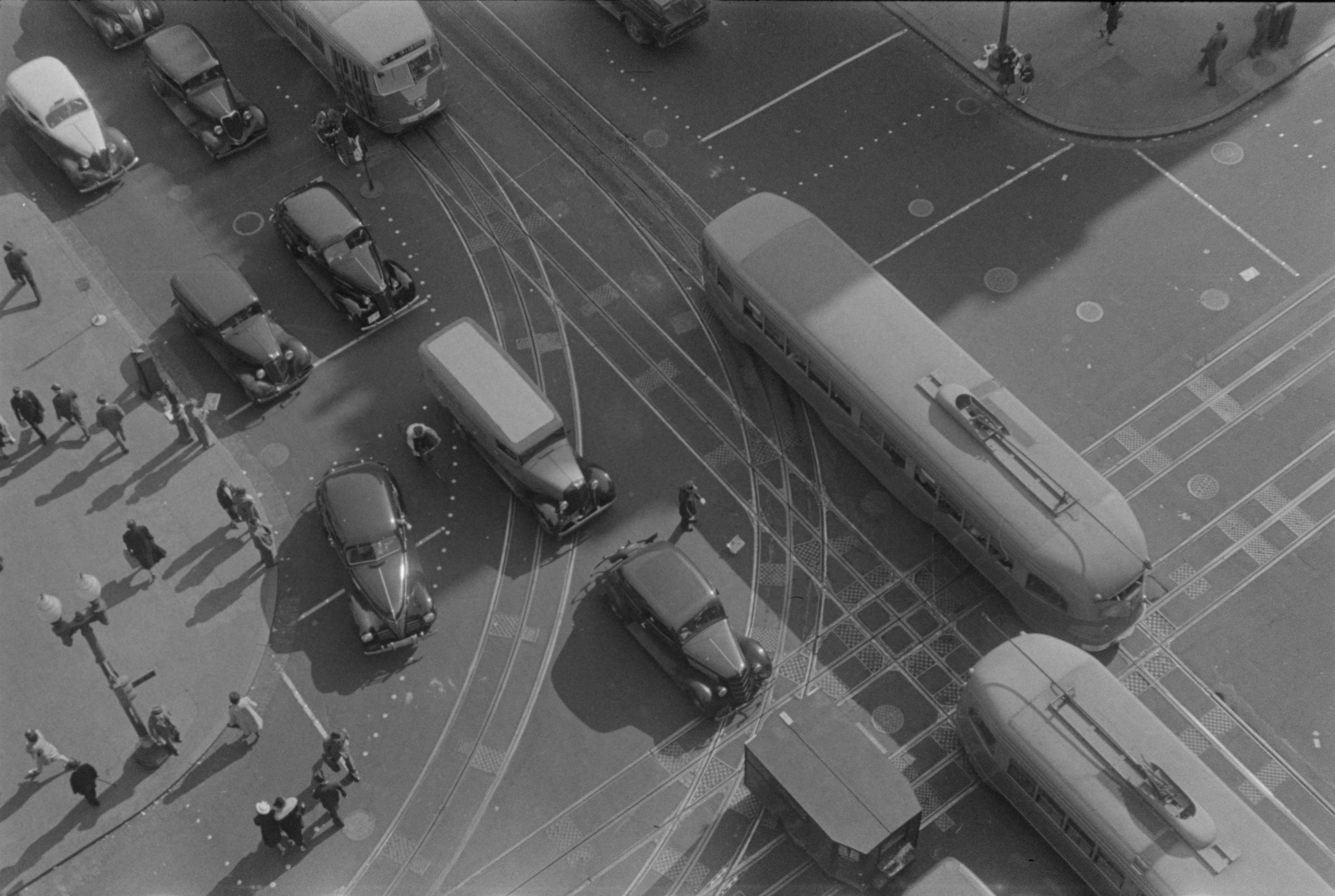
Aerial view of PCC street cars at the corner of 14th Street and Pennsylvania Avenue in front of the Willard Hotel in 1939

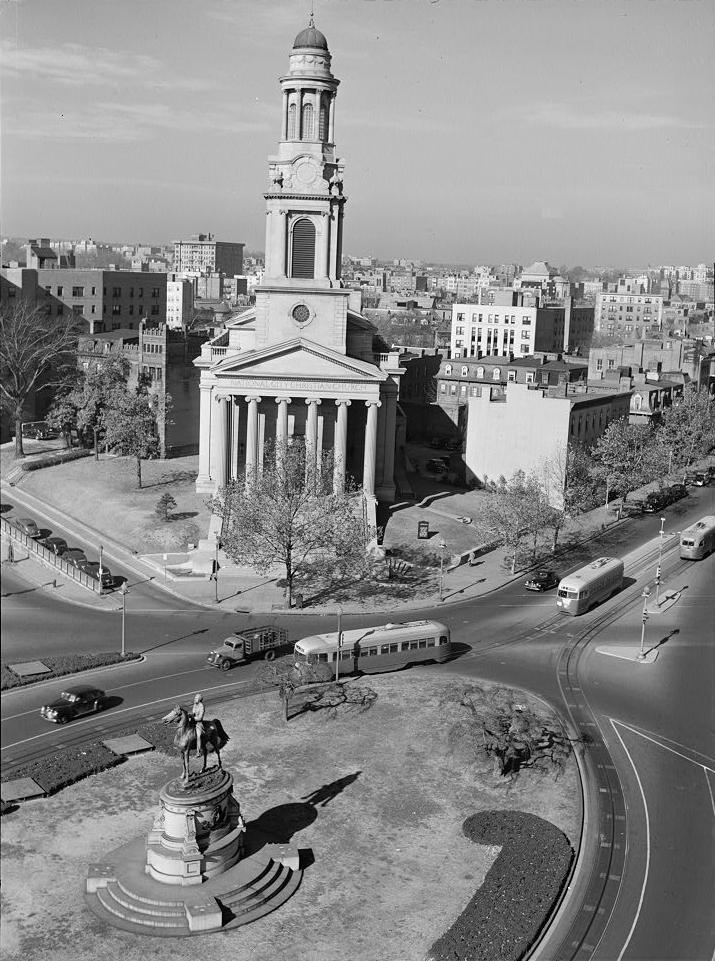
14th Street PCC streetcars at Thomas Circle in 1943

1942 photo shows two Capital Transit streetcars, one arriving at and one departing from the Friendship Heights loop on Wisconsin Avenue.

On December 1, 1933, the WREC, Capital Traction, and Washington Rapid Transit merged to form the Capital Transit Company, unifying the street railways of Washington, D.C., under one company for the first time. Capital Traction was dissolved, while WREC continued to exist as a holding company, owning half of Capital Transit and all of Potomac Electric Power Company (PEPCO).

The new Capital Transit closed the Capital Traction generating plant in Georgetown (it would be decommissioned in 1943) and thereafter used only conventionally supplied electric power.

In the summer of 1935, Capital Transit converted several major lines from streetcar to buses: the line from Friendship Heights to Rockville (formerly the Washington and Rockville), the P Street line (Metropolitan), the Anacostia-Congress Heights line (Capital Railway) and the Connecticut Avenue line in Chevy Chase (Rock Creek). At the same time, the Chesapeake Beach Railway and the Washington, Baltimore and Annapolis interurban ceased operations.

Because the Rockville line in Maryland was one of the lines that was closed, the Capital Transit Community Terminal was opened at Wisconsin Avenue NW and Western Avenue NW on August 4, 1935. At the same time, the car barn on the west side of Wisconsin at Ingomar was razed and replaced with the Western Bus Garage.

In 1936, the system introduced route numbers.

In the 1940s, Capital Transit continued to switch to buses. In 1942 it built a bus garage at 900 Michigan Avenue and converted the Columbia Railway Company Car Barn to a bus barn. The last streetcar on the Anacostia-Congress Heights line ran on July 16, 1935. In 1948, Capital Transit substituted buses on the Benning-Rosslyn line between Kenilworth and the Seat Pleasant loop; and between the corner of 13th and New York Avenue.

Still, it continued to invest in its streetcar fleet. On August 28, 1937, the first PCC streetcars began running on 14th Street NW. By early 1946, the company would place in service 489 of the streamlined, modern PCC model and, in the early 1950s, become the first in the nation to have an all-PCC fleet.

During World War II, gasoline rationing limited automobile use, but transit companies were exempt from the rationing. Meanwhile, wage freezes held labor costs in check. With increased revenue and steady costs, Capital Transit conservatively built up a $7 million cash reserve. In 1945, Capital Transit had America's third-largest streetcar fleet.

During the 1930s, city newspapers began pushing for streetcar tunneling, reviving a decades-old idea. (The Capitol Subway was built in 1906 and three years later, the Washington Post called for a citywide subway to be built.) The full $35 million plan to depress streets as trenches for exclusive streetcar use never materialized, but in 1942 an underground loop terminal was built at 14th and C Streets SW under the Bureau of Engraving and on December 14, 1949, the Connecticut Avenue subway tunnel under Dupont Circle, running from N Street to R Street, was opened.

In 1946 in a decision by the United States Supreme Court in North American Co. v. Securities and Exchange Commission, the Supreme Court upheld the Public Utility Holding Company Act of 1935 and forced North American, because it also owned the Potomac Electric Power Co., to sell its shares of Capital Transit.

Buyers were hard to come by, but on September 12, 1949, Louis Wolfson and his three brothers purchased from North American 46.5% of the company's stock for $20 per share and the WREC was dissolved. For $2.2 million they bought a company with $7 million in cash. The Wolfsons began paying themselves huge dividends until, in 1955, the company's bank account was down to $2.7 million. During the same period, transit trips dropped by 40,000 trips per day and automobile ownership doubled.

Capital Transit lost one of its last freight customers in 1954 when the East Washington Railway took over the delivery of coal from the B&O to the PEPCO power plant at Benning. This had been done using Capital Transit's steeple-cab electric locomotives operating over a remnant of the Benning car line.

=== D.C. Transit ===
In January 1955, the Capital Transit Company, which then operated 750 buses and 450 streetcars, unsuccessfully sought permission to increase fares. That spring, employees asked for a raise and the company refused.

Frustrated, employees went on strike on July 1, 1955. The strike, only the third in D.C. history and the first since a three-day strike in 1945, lasted for seven weeks. Commuters were forced to hitch rides and walk in the brutal summer heat. Frustrated with the strike, Congress passed a bill to revoke the CTC's franchise and its charter on August 3, 1955. With the strike still unsettled, Eisenhower signed the bill on August 15, 1955.

In late 1955, Capital Transit decided to abandon the tracks across the Key Bridge to the Rosslyn Station rather than pay the much higher cost to rebuild them with the bridge. On August 26, the last streetcar ran across the bridge, ending the operation of streetcars in Virginia.

Bids were requested for a new company to take over transit operations in D.C., and on July 24, 1956, Public Law 84-757 (An Act to grant a franchise to D. C. Transit System, Inc., and for other purposes) was approved giving the franchise to D.C. Transit. Just past midnight on August 15, 1957, O. Roy Chalk, a New York financier, bought the franchise for $13.5 million (equivalent to $160 million in 2025) and renamed it D.C. Transit.

Chalk controlled D.C. Transit through his controlling interest in Trans Caribbean Airways. According to 1959 Congressional testimony, Trans Caribbean owned 85% of the stock of D.C. Transit. At that time, Trans Caribbean was a small scheduled carrier flying from New York to San Juan, Puerto Rico.

=== Abandonment ===
As part of the sale of Capital Transit to Chalk, Congress required him to replace all streetcars with buses by 1963. Chalk fought the retirement of the streetcars but was unsuccessful, and the final abandonment of the streetcar system began in 1956.

Abandonment continued in 1959 when DC Transit terminated service on the North Capitol Street (Route 80) and Maryland (Route 82) lines . The Glen Echo (Route 20), Friendship Heights (Route 30) & Georgia Avenue (Routes 70, 72, 74) streetcar lines were abandoned at the start of 1960 and the Southern Division (Maine Avenue) Car Barn was closed. This technically ended "trolley" cars in D.C. as only conduit operations remained. The streetcar lines to Mount Pleasant (Routes 40, 42) and 11th Street (Route 60) were abandoned at the end of 1961.

The remaining system, including lines to the Navy Yard, the Colorado Avenue terminal, and the Bureau of Engraving (Routes 50, 54) and to the Calvert Street Loop, Barney Circle, and Union Station (Routes 90, 92) was shut down in January 1962. Early on the morning of Sunday, January 28, 1962, preceded by cars 1101 and 1053, car 766 entered the Navy Yard Car Barn for the last time, and Washington's streetcars became history. The last scheduled run, filled with enthusiasts and drunken college students, left 14th and Colorado at 2:17 am and arrived at Navy Yard ten minutes late at 3:05 am. One last special trip, carrying organized groups of trolley enthusiasts, set out after that and returned at 4:45 am. By the afternoon of the 28th, workers began tearing out the streetcar tracks and platforms along 14th Street.

In 1972, when WMATA took over transit operations from D.C. Transit, it was allowed by law to force the sale of any D.C. Transit properties that it thought it would need to provide transit. It purchased the Decatur Street carbarn, the Colorado Terminal and loop, the Calvert Street Bridge terminal and loop, the Chevy Chase terminal and loop, the Quincy Street NE terminal and loop, the Friendship Heights terminal and loop, and the Seat Pleasant terminal. It chose not to buy the carbarn on East Capitol Street, the Navy Yard carbarn, the Georgetown carbarn, the M Street Shops, the Eckington carbarn, the Grace Street powerhouse, the Cabin John Trolley right-of-way and several bus properties.

=== Revival ===
Following the abandonment of the system, there were efforts to restart it or build a replacement which culminated with the construction and opening of the DC Streetcar in 2016, which closed ten years later, again leaving the city without a streetcar system.

In 1984, the District used a $250,000 federal grant to study a 7-year old proposal to build a 13-mile trolley system connecting Georgetown, Foggy Bottom, Dupont Circle and Adams-Morgan.

== Remnants ==
=== Streetcars ===
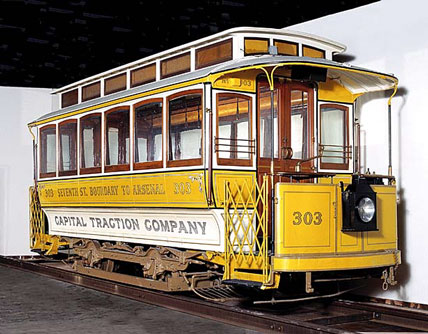
Now on display in the Smithsonian's National Museum of American History, this four-wheel, electric motor car was one of 16 built for the Capital Traction Company by the American Car Company. Car #303 was assigned to the 7th Street line, which ran from the Wharves to Boundary. It was used as a motor car and regularly pulled a light trailer car until its retirement from regular service in 1913.

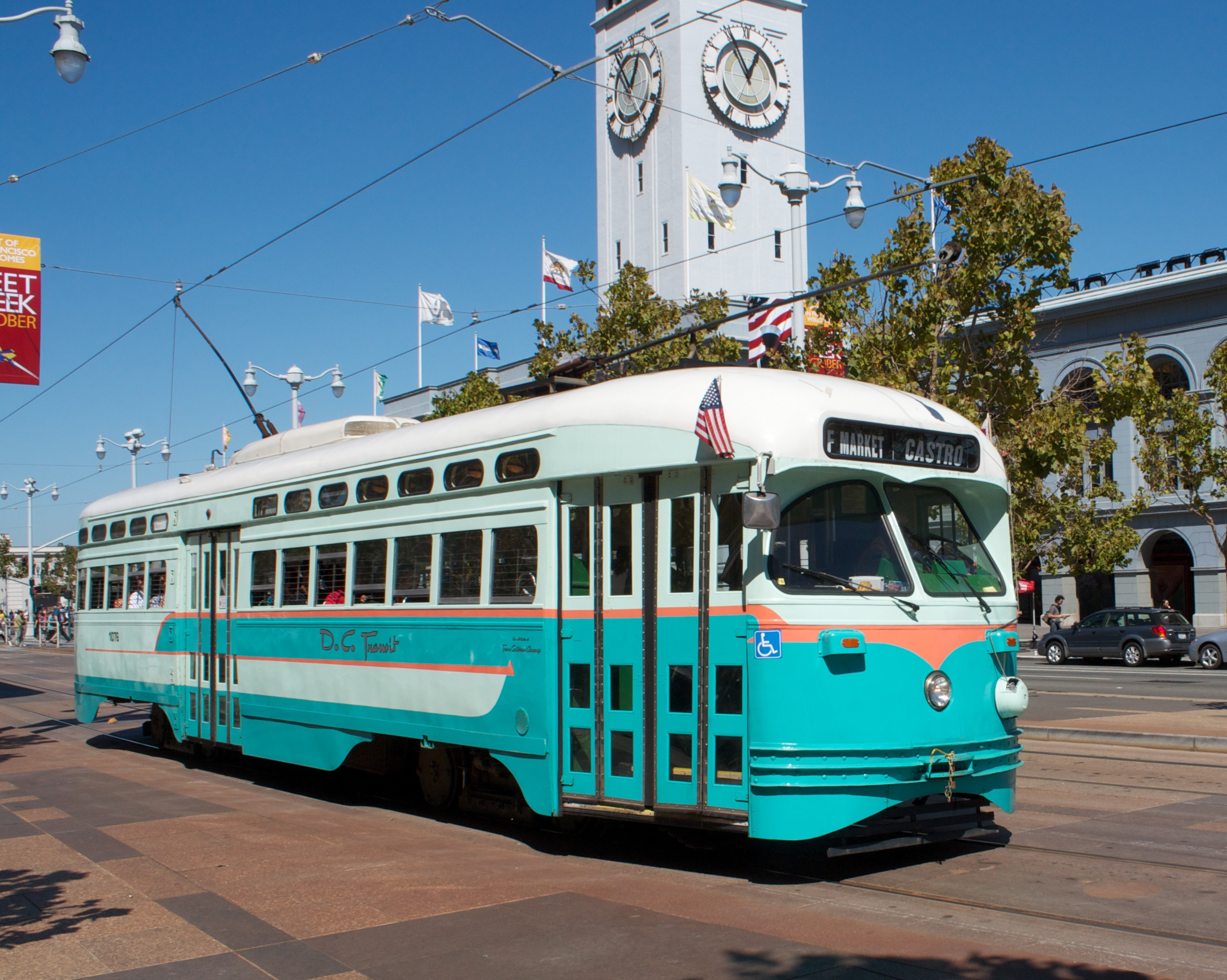
In tribute to Washington, D.C.'s use of PCC streetcars, this ex-Newark streetcar was run on a heritage streetcar service in San Francisco, wearing DC Transit colors during 2010.

After the system was abandoned, several hundred cars were cut in half at the center door and scrapped. Others were sold. Barcelona's system bought 101 cars, some of which operated until 1971; Sarajevo ran 71 cars until 1983, including nine that were turned into the only articulated PCC streetcars. Fort Worth, Texas, bought 15 that ran on the Tandy Center Subway until it shut down in 2002.

About 20 streetcars remain in existence, none in daily operation. One restored Capital Transit PCC car runs in occasional special service in Sarajevo. One of the Fort Worth trams, Capital Transit 1551, was repainted and transferred to the McKinney heritage streetcar in Dallas in 2002, but has been out of service since 2006 with mechanical and electrical problems.

Others serve as museum pieces. The only Washington streetcar still in the District is Capital Traction 303, on display in the Smithsonian Institution's National Museum of American History. The Smithsonian also holds Washington and Georgetown 212 in storage at its facility in Suitland, Maryland.

Others are preserved, in various conditions, at the National Capital Trolley Museum in Colesville, Maryland, including D.C. Transit/Capital Transit 1101, 1430, and 1540; Capital Traction 522, 27 (ex-DC Transit 766) and 09; and WREC 650. Three more were destroyed in a fire on September 28, 2003. In July 2020, the museum acquired DC Transit 1470 from the Virginia Museum of Transportation in Roanoke, Virginia.

Farther from D.C., Capital Transit 010 (a snow sweeper) is in the collection of the Connecticut Trolley Museum. D.C. Transit 1304 is at the Seashore Trolley Museum in Kennebunkport, Maine.

Three of the Fort Worth cars are held in storage by North Texas Historic Transportation for inclusion in a planned museum. One of the Tandy Center cars is preserved by Leonard's Museum. Two of the Barcelona cars are privately owned and stored in Madrid, Spain, and Ejea de los Caballeros, Spain. Another two are in the Museu del Transport in Castellar de n'Hug, Spain.

=== Tracks ===
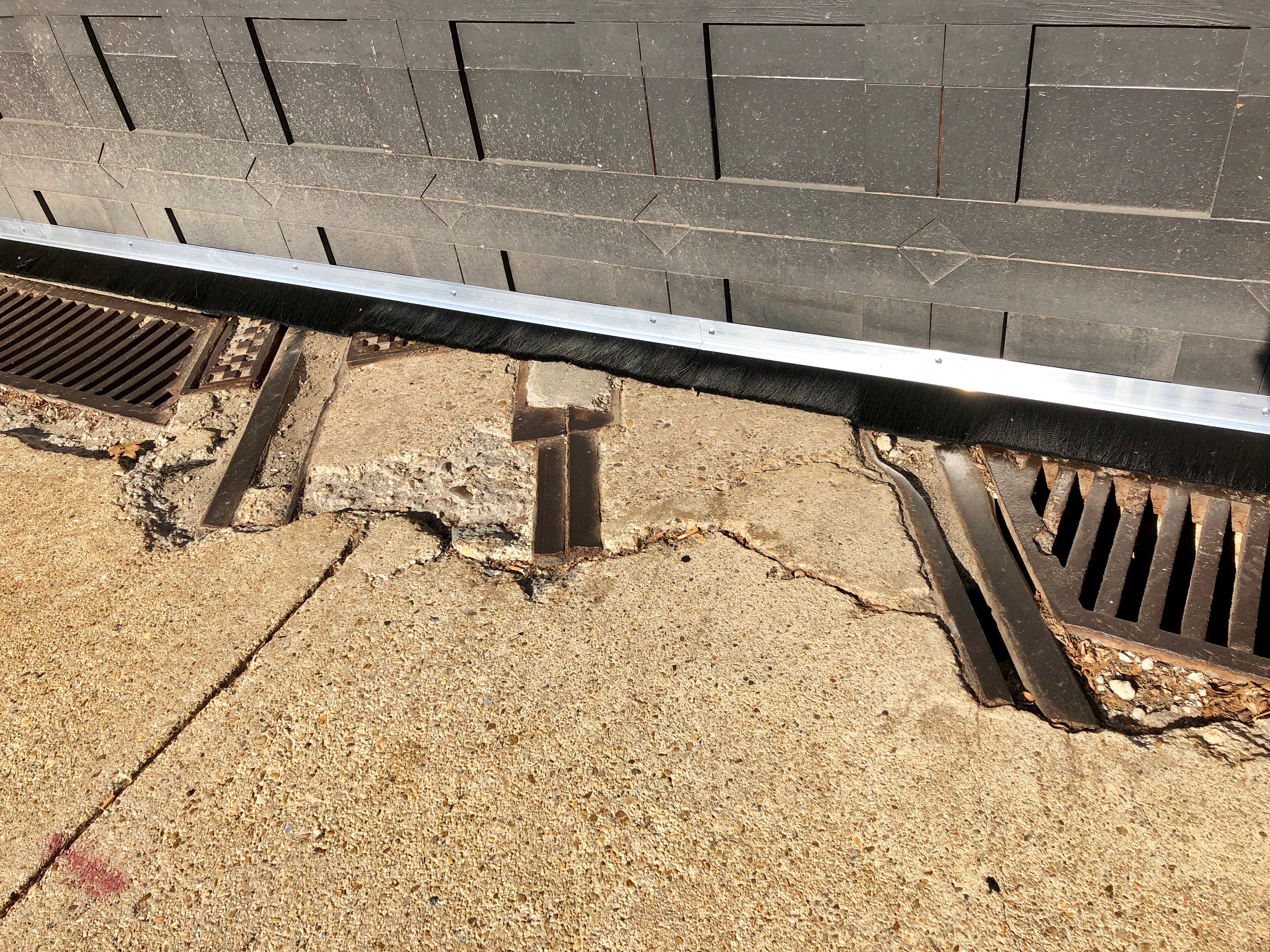
Streetcar tracks and conduit near an M Street door of the Georgetown Car Barn in 2018

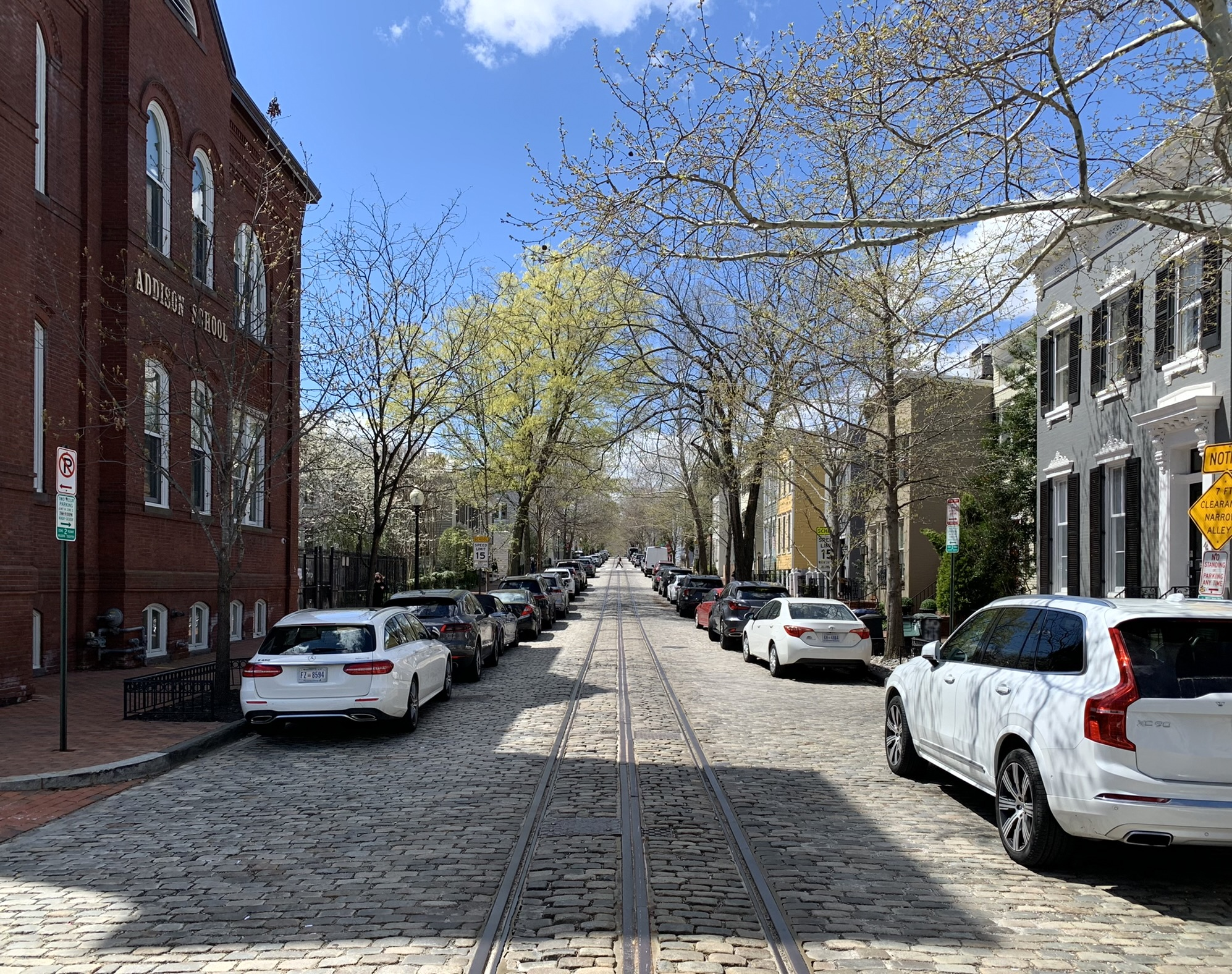
A 2022 photograph of the streetcar tracks and their underground-power-line slot that the Metropolitan Railroad installed on P Street NW during the 1890s

Much of the track in Washington, D.C., was removed and sold for scrap. The complex trackwork on Capitol Plaza in front of Washington Union Station was removed in the mid-1960s. The Pennsylvania Avenue NW trackwork between the Capitol and the Treasury Building was removed during the street's mid-1980s redevelopment. Elsewhere, the track was buried under pavement.

Asphalt covers the loop tracks of the Capital Transit connection behind the closed restaurant on Calvert Street NW, immediately east of the Duke Ellington Bridge. The tracks on Florida Avenue also exist under pavement (as shown by the eternal seam above the conduit). Tracks also exist under Ellington Place NE, 3rd Street NE, 8th Street SE, and elsewhere. In 1977, the tracks on M Street and Pennsylvania Avenue in and near Georgetown were paved over.

Visible remnants of the Metropolitan Railroad's Georgetown tracks and conduit remain intact in the centers of the cobblestoned blocks of O and P Streets NW between 33rd and 35th Streets NW. Remnants of tracks and conduit also remain visible near an M Street door of the Georgetown Car Barn.

=== Car barns, shops, terminals and other buildings ===
Georgetown Park front

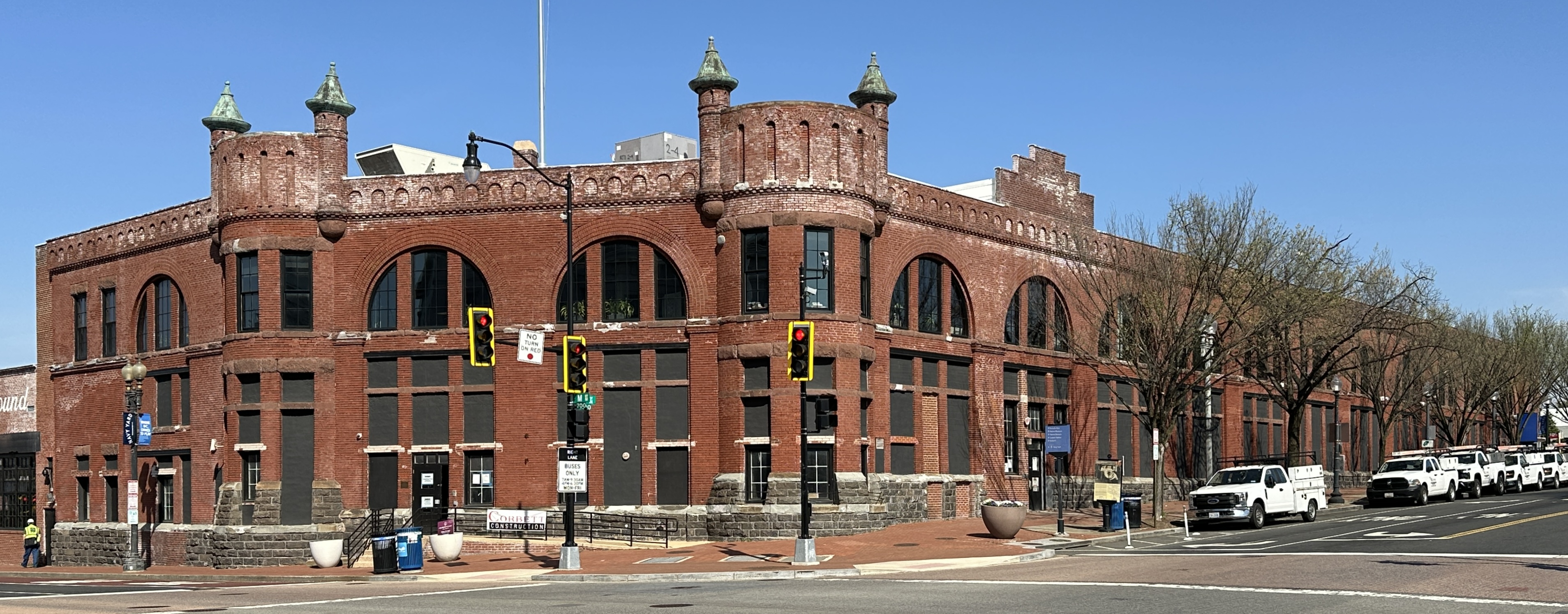
Navy Yard Car Barn in 2026

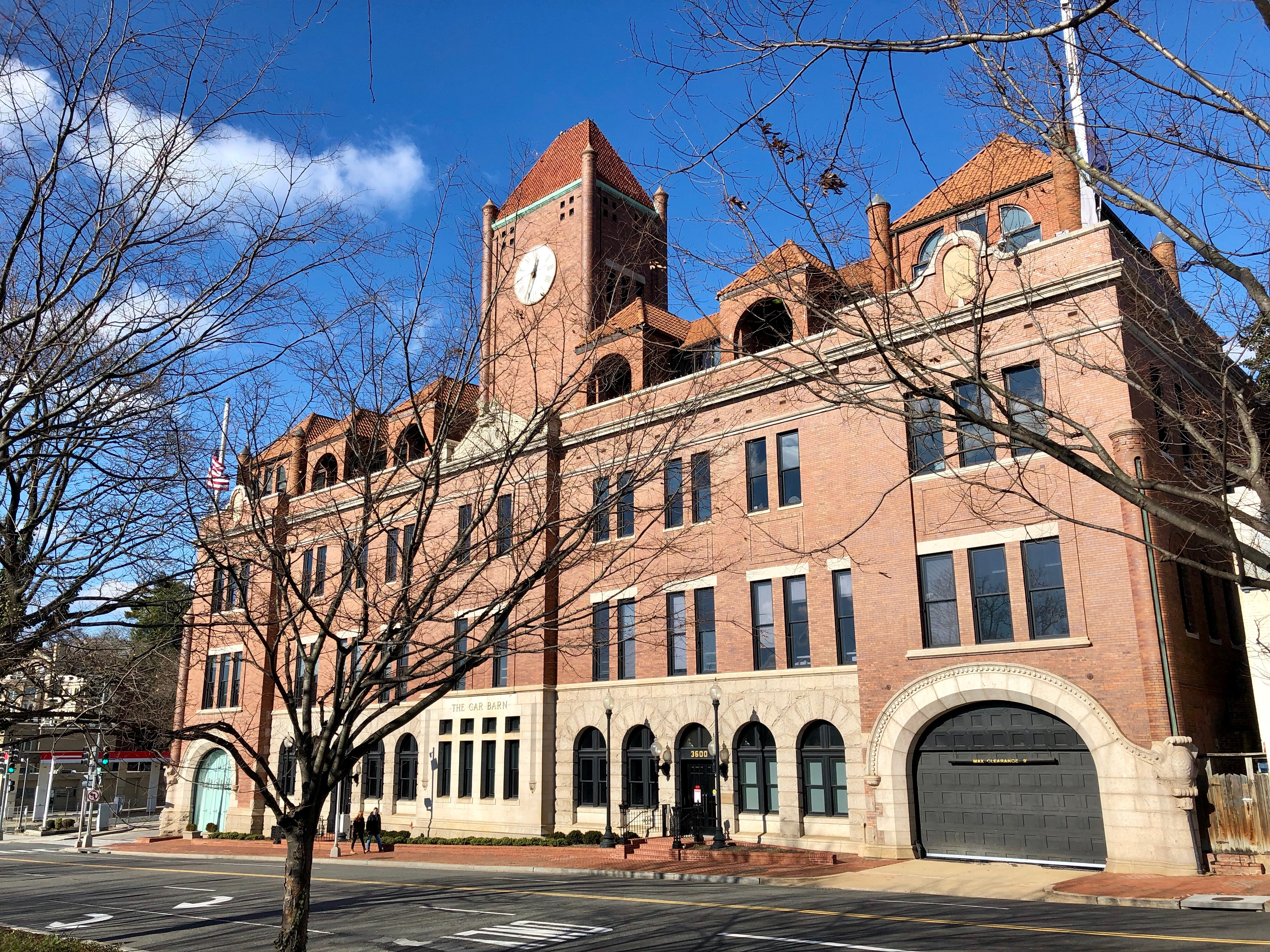
Georgetown Car Barn in December 2018

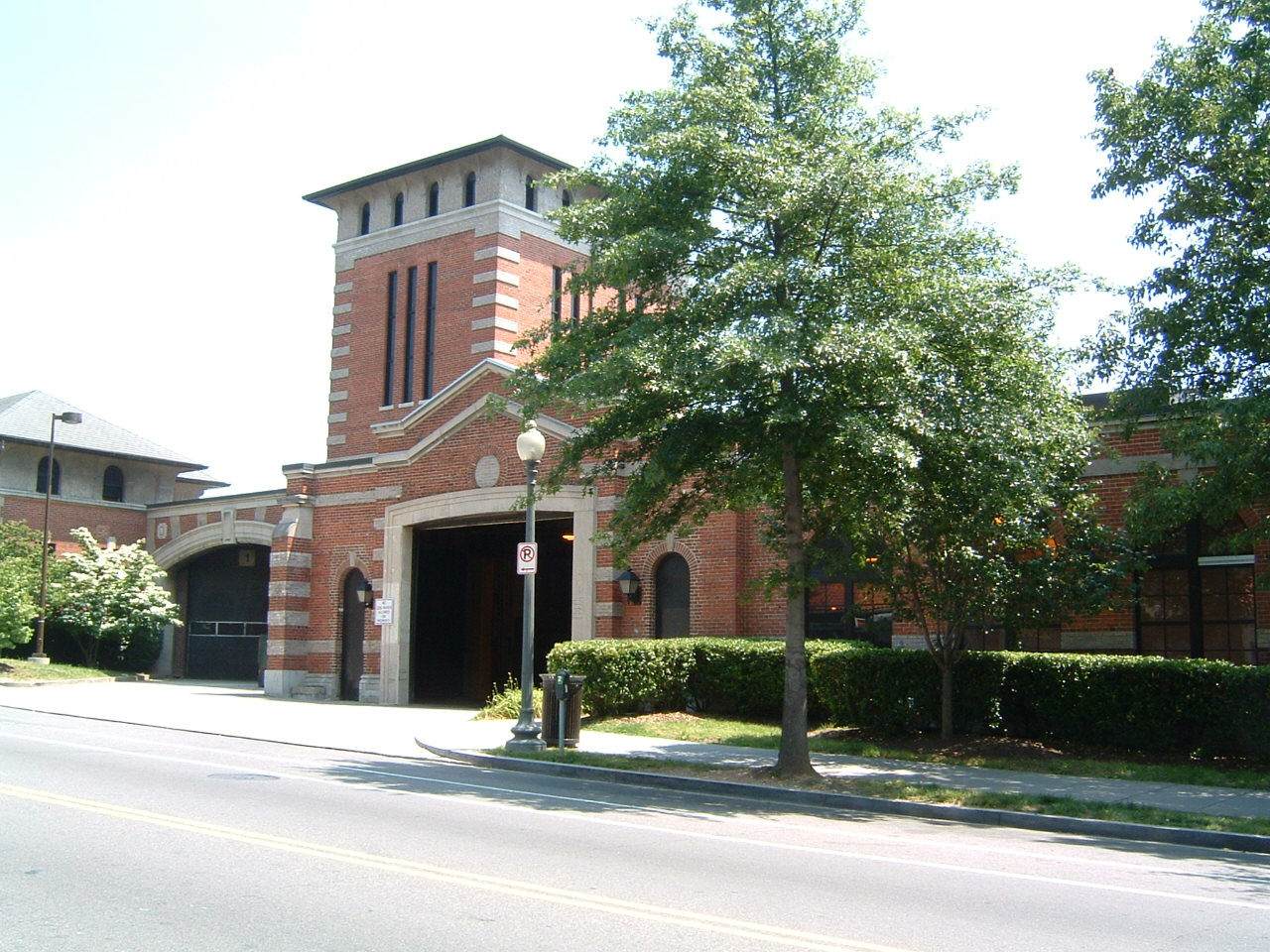
The Decatur Street Car Barn, built in 1906, is now a bus barn.

Some car barns, or car houses as they were later known, have survived in part or in whole:

- Washington and Georgetown Car Barn (3222 M Street NW). Built in 1878–9 by the Washington and Georgetown Railroad Company to house offices, streetcars, and horses, it was sold by DC Transit in the mid-1970s, along with the Grace Street Shops across the canal, to developers who built a project called Georgetown Park. Only its facade remains, incorporated in 1981 into a mall called The Shops at Georgetown Park.
- Grace Street Shops (3221-3225 Grace Street NW). Built by the W&G along with the Car Barn across the canal in 1878-9 for workshops, a granary, a hay barn, and equipment storage, it was converted in the 1890s into a power plant for the streetcars and in 1900 into a repair shop after a larger power station was built. After being sold by DC Transit in the mid-1970s, it was renovated as a home goods store topped by 35 condominiums and rebranded as Canal House, which opened in 1980. It was sometimes grouped into one building with the adjacent Power House.
- Grace Street Power House (3255 Grace Street NW). The D.C. Paper Manufacturing Company erected the three-bay brick-and-steel power house in 1917. By 1919, the paper company was using a different power house and this one was purchased by the Capitol Traction Company for use as a storeroom. In the mid-1970s, it was converted to offices by Holland and Lyons.
- The Washington and Georgetown Railroad Company Car Barn (1346 Florida Avenue NW). Built by the W&G in 1877 and sold in 1892, it is known today as the west building of the Manhattan Laundry. From 1999 to 2014, it served as the home to the Booker T. Washington Public Charter School. As of 2025, it was home to a bar, restaurant, coffee shop.
- Eckington Car Barn (400 T Street NE). Erected to replace a car barn that burned down before 1920, it is a vehicle maintenance facility for the U.S. Postal Service.
- The Georgetown Car Barn (3600 M Street NW). Built in 1893 by the Capital Traction Company, it serves as classroom and administrative space for Georgetown University.
- The Washington and Georgetown Railroad Car House (colloquially "The Navy Yard Car Barn" or "The Blue Castle") (770 M Street SE). A rare surviving artifact of the cable car era, it was built by the W&G in 1893 and purchased in 2014 by the National Community Church, which renovated it.
- The East Capitol Street Car Barn (1400 East Capitol Street NE). Designed by Waddy Wood and built in 1896 by the Metropolitan Railroad Company, it was turned into condominiums in 2004.
- The Decatur Street Car Barn (4615 14th Street NW). Built in 1906 by the Capital Traction Company, it has been used for decades by WMATA as a Metrobus barn. It is the only car barn still used for transit.
- Benning Car House (northeast corner of Benning Road & Kenilworth Avenue) Built in 1941, it served until the line was converted to buses in 1949. The building has been structurally modified; it sits on the grounds of PEPCO's Benning Road Power Plant.
- Brookland Garage (10th Street and Michigan Avenue, N.E.). Built by Capitol Transit in 1942, it was transferred to D.C. Transit, and used by Chalk's DCTECH machine tool company. WMATA chose not to buy it in 1972, and it was awarded to the Rider's Fund in 1990. In 1997, it was transferred with the Rider's Fund to WMATA. It has long been used as offices.

Other buildings were demolished:

- The Anacostia and Potomac River Car Barn at Martin Luther King Jr. Avenue SE and V Street SE is gone.
- The Columbia Railway Car Barn in Trinidad served as a bus barn until it was demolished in 1971 and replaced with apartments.
- The Metropolitan Street Railway Car Barn (a.k.a. the Seventh Street-Wharves Barn) and the adjacent shops on 4th Street SW were sold by D.C. Transit in 1959; three years later, they were torn down to make room for the Riverside Condominiums.
- The Tenleytown Car Barn (a.k.a. Western Carhouse or Tennally Town Car Barn), the first car barn and powerhouse for the Tennallytown line, was built around 1897 at what is now the intersection of Wisconsin Avenue NW and Calvert Street NW. It was removed sometime before 1920 and replaced around 1935. This second structure was removed before 1958.
- The Capital Traction Company Powerhouse in Georgetown was torn down in 1968; the land it sat on is now part of the Georgetown Waterfront Park.
- Falls Barn, near Georgetown University, was demolished between 1948 and 1958.
- A car barn was built in Mount Pleasant around 1892, but it was gone by 1948.
- A barn was built at 2411 P Street NW by the Metropolitan around 1870 and served as stables, a power house, car barn and repair shops. Much of the property was destroyed when Q Street was extended, but the remainder lasted until at least 1920.
- The Friendship Heights Car Barn (off Wisconsin Avenue south of Jenifer Street). Built around 1908 by WREC, it was razed in the early 1960s.
- The Brightwood Car House, at 5929 Georgia Avenue NW, was built in 1909 as a car barn and electric generation substation to replace a "car stable" that had burned down on January 16, 1898. It was designed by the engineer W.B. Upton, who also designed the Eckington car barn. In 1955, PEPCO sold the car barn, which became the showroom and service center for Hicks Chevrolet, which modified the façade. In 1976, the dealership was sold and became Curtis Chevrolet. Curtis Chevrolet closed on November 30, 2007, and the former car house was sold to Foulger-Pratt for redevelopment. The D.C. Historical Preservation Society asked Foulger-Pratt to reuse, not destroy, the building. Instead, Walmart announced in 2010 that they planned to raze it and build a store on the site. Demolition began on September 6, 2011, and was halted shortly thereafter for a historical preservation review, but historic designation was denied and the entire structure came down in March 2012. The new Walmart store, which opened on December 2, 2013, includes bricks and trusses from the car barn, which is all that remains of it.

=== Stations and loops ===
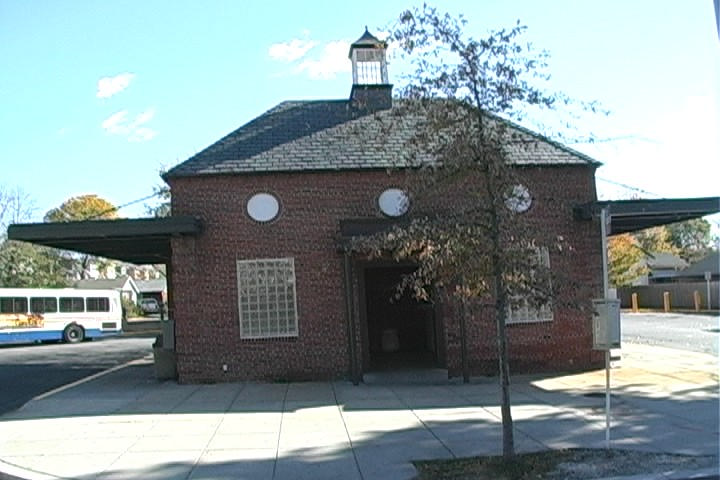
The station at 14th Street and Colorado Avenue NW

A few stations, terminals, and loops have survived.

- The Calvert Street loop (just east of the Duke Ellington Bridge) was built by the Capital Traction Company in 1899 with a modest brick freight station, east of the current structure, designed by architect Waddy B. Wood. Sometimes called the "Rock Creek Loop" and the freight station the "Rock Creek Terminal" or the "Calvert Street Waiting Station", it became a trolley/bus transfer point when the streetcars were removed from the bridge and points west in 1935. In 1940, the Toddle House Corporation razed the station and built the existing structure as a diner with a transit pavilion on its west side. The restaurant was abandoned in 1971 and its back area was renovated in the 1970s and 1980s into a restroom and small break room for bus drivers. By 1979, the pavilion was removed. In 2020–21, it was rehabilitated along with the Chevy Chase and Colorado Avenue terminals. It is currently used as a Metrobus turnaround loop and driver facility.
- Chevy Chase terminal and loop (5720 Connecticut Avenue NW). Built in Colonial Revival style in 1941, it was acquired by WMATA and is used as a bus terminal.
- The Colorado Avenue Terminal and loop at Colorado and 14th Street NW dates back to the early 20th Century when the 14th Street line was extended to Colorado by 1908. By 1918, when it became a transfer point to the Takoma line, there was a transfer station there. The current terminal was constructed by 1937, when the line to Takoma was converted to buses as part of a reorganization of the transit system. It was transferred to various transit organization until it was purchased by WMATA in 1972 and used as a bus terminal. In 2020 and 2021, it was rehabilitated.
- Dupont Circle streetcar stations (Dupont Circle NW). After conversion of the Mt. Pleasant Line in December 1961, these underground stations were used as a civil defense storage area for a few years and then left empty again. The space was once considered for a columbarium. In 1993, one of the stations was opened as a food court called DuPont Down Under; it closed after 18 months. In 2007, D.C. Council member Jim Graham considered allowing adult-themed clubs to move into the property. Since 2016, it has been an arts space managed by a nonprofit called Dupont Underground.
- Streetcar turnaround (11th and Monroe NW). Now the 11th and Monroe Streets Park.

Many terminals and loops have been removed:

- The Seat Pleasant loop. Built by Capital Transit in 1945 to accommodate new streamlined streetcars, it was used by D.C. Transit buses after the streetcars stopped running to it three years later. It was transferred to WMATA in 1972. Bus service ended in 1981 when the new Capitol Heights Metro station opened. In 2014, as the Eastbrooke Apartments were being erected on the empty site, the buried trackage from the Seat Pleasant loop was uncovered and transferred to the National Capitol Trolley Museum.
- The Barney Circle terminal was removed in the 1970s.
- The Friendship Heights terminal and loop along Wisconsin Circle north of Western Avenue in Maryland. Dedicated on Dec 14, 1936, the facility was built by Capital Transit to enable transfers between streetcars and the buses that replaced its Montgomery County trolley line. After streetcar service ended in 1960, it was used by D.C. Transit buses and, after 1972, by WMATA buses. In the mid-1980s, it was razed, along with an adjacent Howard Johnson's, to make room for the Chevy Chase Metro Building, which opened in 1985.
- The Brookland terminal and loop (aka Quincy Street terminal) at Quincy and 12th NE. Built by Capital Transit in 1948, six years after the PUC approved it, it was later used by D.C. Transit. WMATA used it from 1972 until 1978, when its buses were rerouted to the new Brookland Metro Station. WMATA sold the loop in 1979 and around 1980 or 1981 it was razed and replaced by a 7-Eleven that operated for a few years at 1010 Quincy Street NE.
- In 1923, the Francis Scott Key Bridge replaced the Aqueduct Bridge and the W&OD Railway was barred from crossing it. Capital Traction built a new passenger terminal for the W&OD at Rosslyn Circle adjacent to a new loop for Capital Transit streetcars. In 1939, that station was torn down to allow for Rosslyn Circle to be raised as part of the project to extend the George Washington Memorial Parkway beneath the Key Bridge. The next year, Capital Transit built a new streetcar terminal in the circle. In 1956, streetcars stopped using the terminal and it became a bus terminal. The Rosslyn Terminal passed to D.C. Transit and was then purchased by WMATA in 1972. In 1973, DC added express bus lanes through Rosslyn Circle and removed them in 1977 when the Rosslyn Metro Station opened and buses were rerouted there. As a result, by 1979 the bus terminal was removed. The streetcar loop was removed in 1988 as part of a George Washington Parkway Improvement project.

=== Tunnels ===
The Dupont Circle streetcar station tunnel entrances, located where the medians of Connecticut Avenue NW now stand, north of N Street NW, and between R Street NW and S Street NW, were filled in and paved over in August 1964, leaving only the traffic tunnel.

The C Street NW/NE tunnel beneath the Upper Senate Park remained in use as a one-way service road adjacent to the Capitol, but since 9/11 it has been closed to the public.

The Bureau of Engraving and Printing underground loop is now part of a parking structure and storage area that is located directly underneath 14th Street SW. Tracks can still be seen in the floors in some locations of the Bureau.

=== Right-of-way ===
==== Georgetown-Cabin John ====
Much of the Cabin John trolley right-of-way still exists, including the parts from the Georgetown Car Barn to the Dalecarlia Reservoir filtration plant in D.C. and from the District line to Cabin John in Maryland. The D.C. section includes an abutment near an entrance to Georgetown University, a trestle over Foundry Branch in Glover Archbold Park, the median of Sherier Place NW from Cathedral Avenue NW to Manning Place NW, and a strip of land along most of the right-of-way.

In 1968, DC passed a resolution closing the Glover-Archbold Parkway and the next year gave title of the section of the trolley right-of-way in the parkway to the United States National Park Service.

In 1972, when WMATA took over operations from D.C. Transit, it chose not to purchase the Cabin John right-of-way. The land was considered as a route for the Palisades Parkway proposal, which was ultimately scuttled in 1977 when the Three Sisters Bridge was removed from D.C.'s master transportation plan. D.C. Transit eventually sold off parts of the land.

In the late 1970s and early 1980s, Chalk attempted to build townhouses on two portions of the right-of-way—the small piece on the southwest corner of Georgetown University's campus, and on the strip from Foxhall Road to Glen Echo—but he was stopped by opposition from the Park Service and other nearby landowners.

In 1982, DC condemned the right-of-way from Norton Street NW to Foxhall Road to build a crosstown water main. The following year, the city was ordered to pay D.C. Transit $8.3 million for the land, a sum later reduced to $6.75 million.

In 1990, the property from Foxhall Road to just east of West Road (as well as the right-of-way in Maryland and other D.C. Transit assets) was transferred from D.C. Transit to a "Rider's Fund" as part of a litigation settlement dealing with excessive bus fares in the 1960s. In 1995, developers proposed to build on the Rider's Fund site (Lot 822) between Foundry Branch and the Canal Road NW entrance to Georgetown University's campus, but the proposal was shot down by neighbors and the Park Service.

In 1996, the U.S. Court of Appeals ordered that the Rider's Fund assets be transferred to the Washington Metropolitan Area Transit Authority (WMATA); this was approved the next year.

In 2007, Georgetown University removed part of the right-of-way on its campus to widen its Canal Road entrance. At some point before 2016, they acquired the right-of-way from this entrance to Prospect Street (Lot 821).

In 2019, the D.C. government prepared a concept plan to build a trail on their section, but decided not to proceed with it.

==== Pennsylvania Avenue SE ====
The wide median of Pennsylvania Avenue SE from the Capitol to Barney Circle, built in 1903 as streetcar right-of-way, now serves as urban greenspace.

==== WB&A ====
The old WB&A right-of-way between Kenilworth Avenue and Seat Pleasant was abandoned when the line was replaced with buses in 1948. In 1957 the right-of-way that was in the center of Deane Avenue NE between Kenilworth and 50th (now Nannie Helen Burroughs Avenue) was used to widen Deane. The National Capitol Planning Commission acquired the portion between 50th and Division Streets in 1950 and it was added to the Watts Branch Parkway. The strip between Division and 55th was purchased by the D.C. Board of Education in 1966 and used for Woodson High School. The strip between 55th and 57th was sold, in the 20th Century, to private developers.

=== Trestles ===
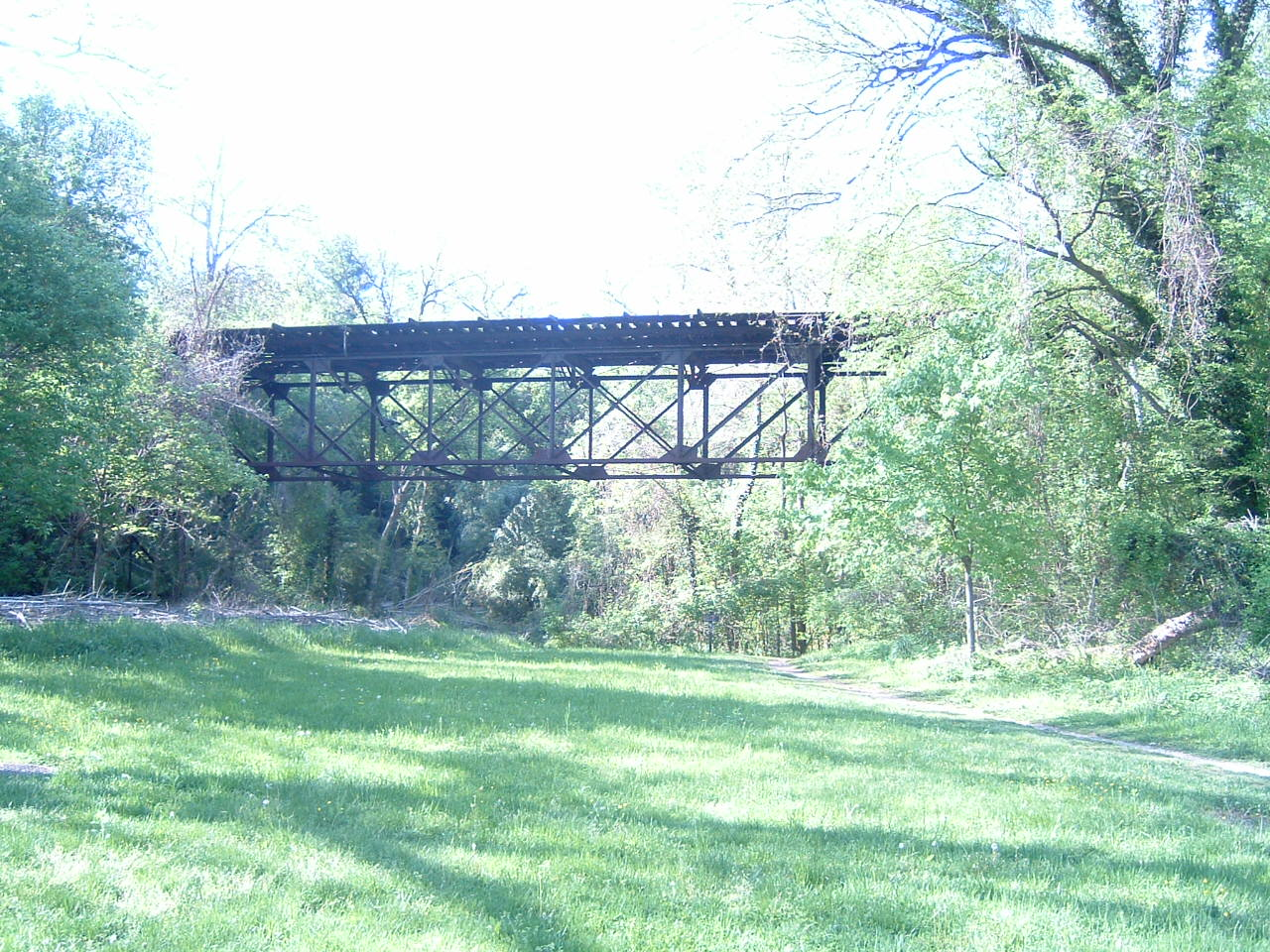
Abandoned trestle of the Cabin John trolley line over Foundry Branch (Bridge #2) as seen from the intersection of Foxhall Road and Canal Road

Bridge No. 2 over Foundry Branch is the last remaining trestle of the six built for the Cabin John trolley line in Washington, D.C.

Bridge No. 1 at Georgetown University was removed in 1976. The other four were purchased by the District government in 1983 and removed during the construction of the Crosstown Watermain: Bridge No. 3 at Clark Place, Bridge No. 4 next to Reservoir Road, Bridge No. 5 over Maddox Branch in Battery Kemble Park, and Bridge No. 6 over Arizona Avenue—the last of which was replaced with a pedestrian bridge to create a trail.

=== Other remnants ===
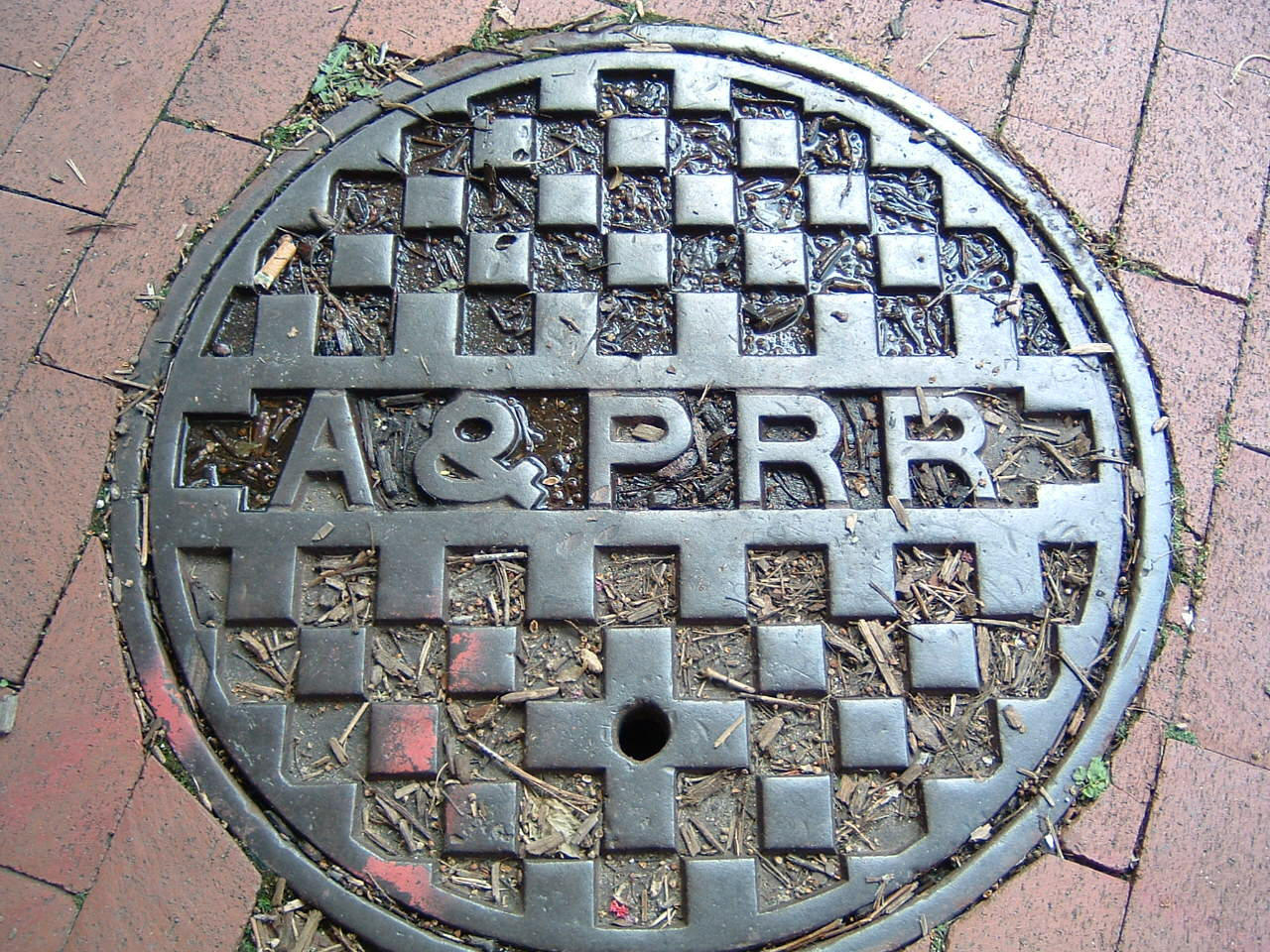
Extant manhole cover from the Anacostia and Potomac River Railroad Company

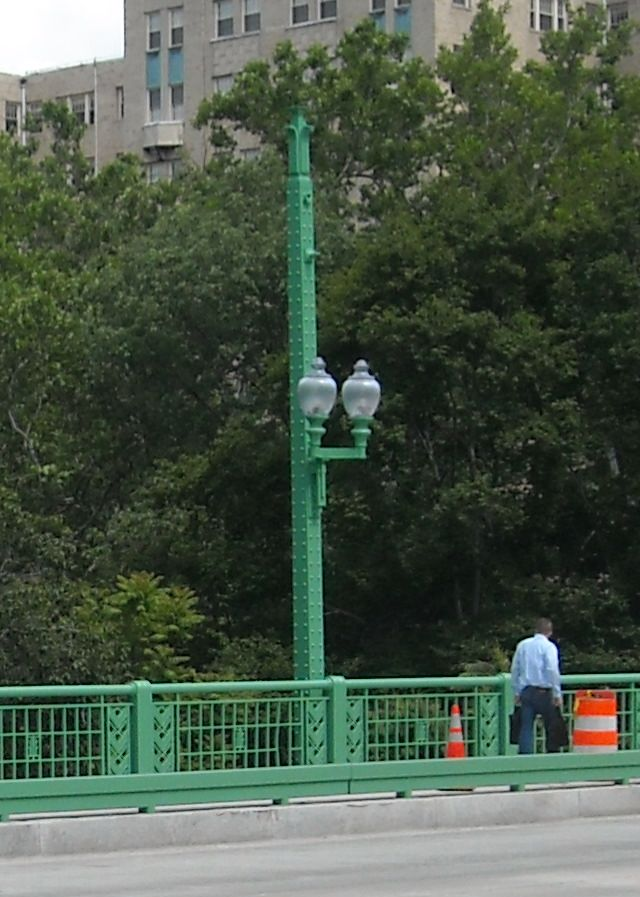
A lamppost on the Klingle Valley Bridge once carried overhead line to power streetcars

Perhaps the most visible remnant of the streetcar system is the Metrobus system, run by the Washington Metropolitan Area Transit Authority (WMATA). On January 14, 1973, WMATA purchased DC Transit and the Washington, Virginia and Maryland Coach Company, then on February 4 added the AB&W Transit Company and WMA Transit Company. This unified all the bus companies in D.C.

Until 2025, many of WMATA's bus routes were only marginally changed from the streetcar lines they followed. For example, the No. 30 streetcar route that ran from Barney Circle to Friendship Heights was the 30 bus line that ran from Anacostia through Barney Circle to Friendship Heights, and the No. 70 streetcar route to Brightwood was the 70 bus that ran to Brightwood.

On June 29, 2025, WMATA changed the names and routes of all bus lines in the system. They no longer reflect the historical streetcar line numbers, instead following a new letter and number pattern.

Other remnants include the Potomac Electric Power Company, the electric portion of Washington Traction and Electric Company, which remains the D.C. area's primary electrical power company. Some streetcar-related manhole covers remain in use around town. Four tall lampposts for Capital Traction's overhead wires on the Connecticut Avenue bridge over Klingle Valley in Cleveland Park. The poles likely date to the bridge's construction in 1931.

The National Capital Trolley Museum holds in its archives an extensive collection of various artifacts from Washington's streetcar systems.

== See also ==
- Streetcars in Washington, D.C., and Maryland
- Bustitution
- General Motors streetcar conspiracy
- National Capital Trolley Museum
- Trolley park
- Urban rail transit
- Washington Metro
- DC Streetcar
