= Columbia Railway =

American streetcar company

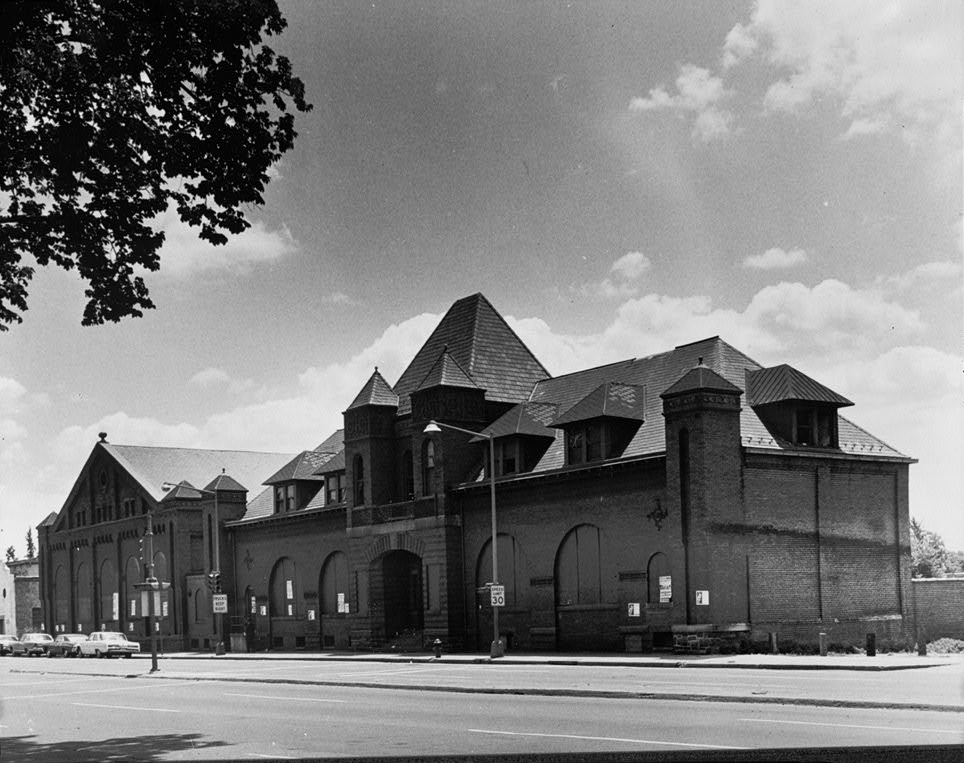
Columbia Railway Company Car Barns aka Trinidad Cable Car Barns, Fifteenth Street NE & Benning Road NE. The barn was built in 1895, converted to electric power in 1899 and to a bus barn in 1942. In 1971 it was demolished.

The Columbia Railway was the third streetcar company to operate in Washington, D.C. It was incorporated and started operations in 1870, running from the Treasury Building along H Street NW/NE to the city boundary at 15th Street NE. It switched to cable power in 1895 and then electric power in 1899. The company extended to Seat Pleasant, Maryland, and Kenilworth in 1898. In the late 19th century, it was purchased by the Washington Traction and Electric Company and on February 4, 1902, became a part of the Washington Railway and Electric Company.

== Origins ==
Chartered by Congress on May 24, 1870, and beginning operations the same year, the Columbia Railway Company was the city's third horse car operator. Its route began at 15th Street and New York Avenue NW, where it intersected the Washington and Georgetown line, and continued east on New York Avenue NW to K Street NW (at that time the location of the Northern Liberties Market, now Mt. Vernon Square). From K Street NW, it went south on Massachusetts Avenue NW to H Street NW and all the way across H Street to the city boundary at 15th Street NE, a round trip distance of five miles. The line began as a single track with turnouts for cars to pass, but a double track was added by 1872. The company built a car barn and stable on the east side of 15th Street just south of H Street at the eastern end of the line. By 1883, the company was running 15 cars, each making 11 trips daily. There were 52 horses in the stable and 34 employees. The Columbia originally ran one-man one horse cars called "bobtails" but these were so unpopular that they led to a rider's strike. As a result, Congress banned the short cars in 1892.

== Switch to mechanical and electrical power ==
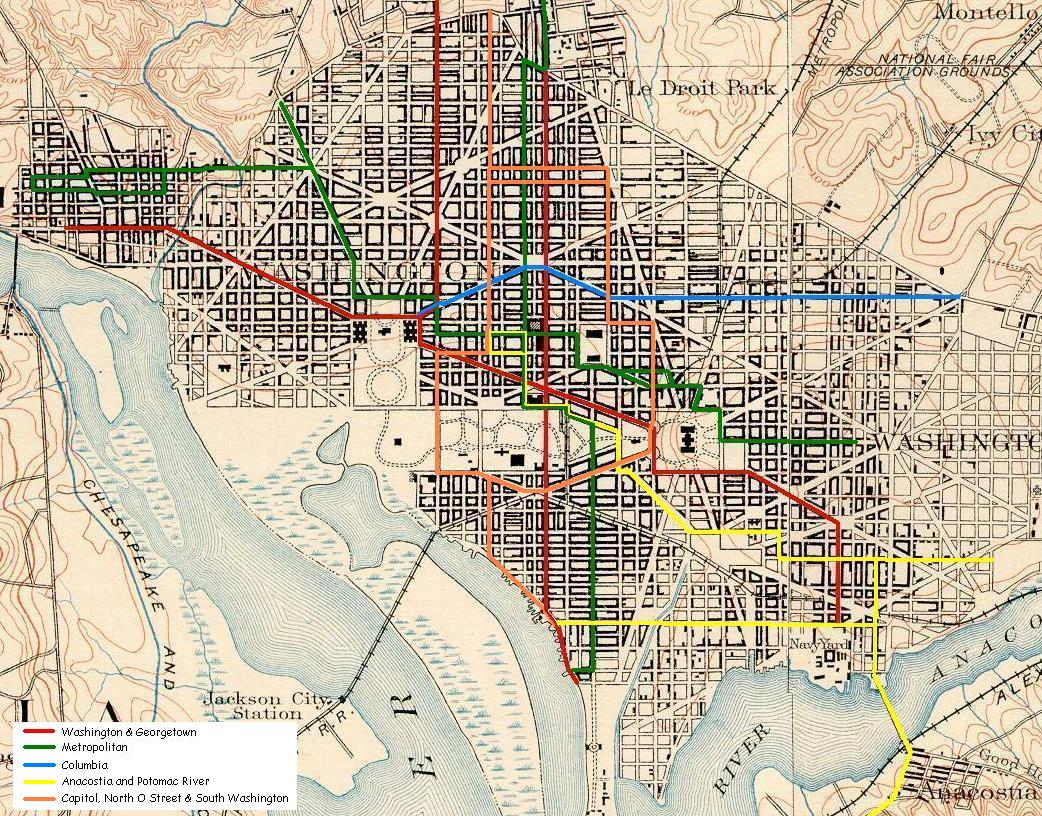
Map of the Washington, D.C. Streetcar System at the end of the Horse Car era in 1888

On March 2, 1889, the District authorized every streetcar company in Washington to switch from horse power to underground cable or to electricity provided by battery or underground wire. In 1890, companies were authorized to sell stock to pay for the upgrades, provided they did not involve overhead wires. In 1892, one-horse cars were banned within the city, and by 1894, Congress began requiring companies to switch to something other than horse power while continuing to disallow overhead lines within the city.

In order to comply with the new rules, the Columbia Railway decided to try a cable system, the last cable car system built in the United States. They built a new cable car barn and began operating the system on March 9, 1895, but it soon became clear that the underground electrical system was superior. It abandoned cable cars and switched to electrical power generated by the power plant built to power its cable operation on July 22, 1899. The last cable car in the city ran the next day.

The Columbia won permission in 1898 to build a line east along Benning Road NE. Since this route was outside the city as defined at the time, overhead wires could be used to provide electric power. The line split on the east side of the Anacostia. One branch ran to Kenilworth, and the other connected at Seat Pleasant with the terminus of the steam-powered Chesapeake Beach Railway.

== The end of the line ==
Between 1896 and 1899, three businessmen purchased controlling interests in several streetcar companies, including the Columbia Railway Company. They incorporated the Washington Traction and Electric Company on June 5, 1899, as a holding company for these interests. But the holding company had borrowed too heavily and paid too much for the subsidiaries and was quickly in financial trouble. So on June 5, 1900, Congress authorized the Washington and Great Falls Railway to acquire the stock of any and all of the railways and power companies owned by Washington Traction. When Washington Traction defaulted on its loans on June 1, 1901, Washington and Great Falls moved in to take its place. On February 4, 1902, Washington and Great Falls changed its name to the Washington Railway and Electric Company, reincorporated as a holding company and exchanged stock in Washington Traction and Electric one for one for stock in the new company (at a discounted rate). This was the end of the Columbia Railway Company.
