= Georgetown Waterfront Park =

Park in Washington, D.C., U.S.

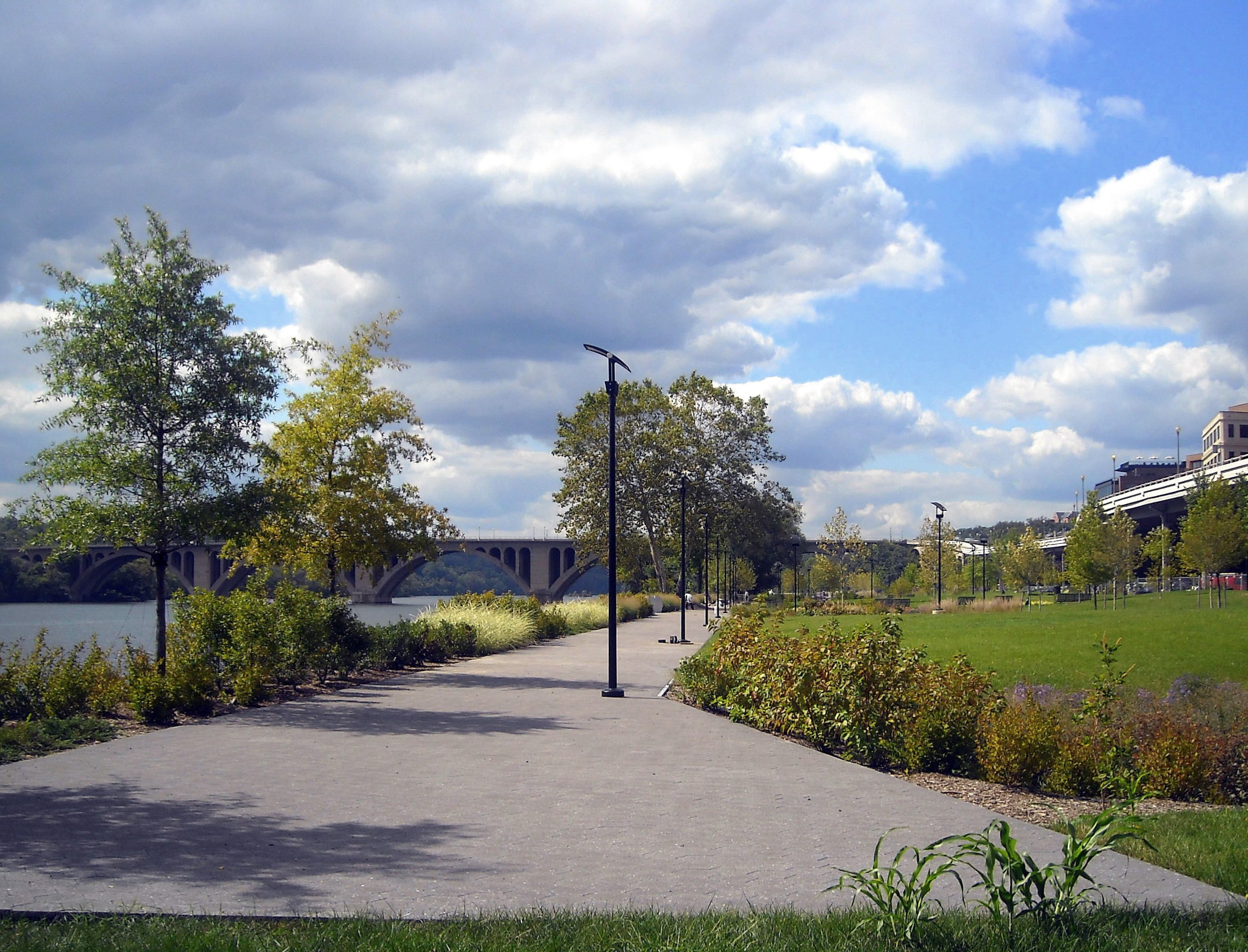
- Georgetown Waterfront Park with the Francis Scott Key Bridge and Whitehurst Freeway in the background in 2008

- Location within Washington, D.C.
- Location: Washington, D.C., U.S.
- Coordinates: 38°54′08″N 77°03′43″W
- Area: 10 acres (4.0 ha)
- Website: www.georgetownwaterfrontpark.org

Georgetown Waterfront Park is a national park completed in Washington, D.C. in the fall of 2011. Part of the Georgetown Historic District, the park stretches along the banks of the Potomac River from 31st Street, NW to the Key Bridge. The result of many years of advocacy and fundraising, the site features several notable design elements. Now complete, the park links 225 miles (362 km) of parkland along the Potomac River stretching from Cumberland, Maryland to Mount Vernon, Virginia. The park was designed to passively complement the natural curve of the river.

== History ==
The park has been in various stages of planning and development for several decades. In 1968, the National Capital Planning Commission identified the Georgetown Waterfront as future parkland. An agreement was reached between the National Park Service and the mayor of the District of Columbia to transfer 10 acres (40,000 m^{2}) of land for the proposed park.

In recent years, the Georgetown waterfront has been redeveloped from industrial blight to a thriving commercial and residential destination. Parts of the park site had served as a parking lot before construction began. The Washington Harbour complex and a movie theater on the Georgetown Incinerator site regularly draw crowds down to the waterfront.

== Design elements ==
The park features gently sloping grass hills and shade trees. The landscape blends with mixed-use paved pathways. The promenade provides panoramic views of Theodore Roosevelt Island, the Key Bridge, and the Kennedy Center. Several distinctive design elements include an interactive fountain, river stairs, and scenic overlooks. This part of the park, known as the Wisconsin Avenue Plaza, serves as a gateway to the Potomac River.
