= Capitol, North O Street and South Washington Railway =

US street railway company

The Capitol, North O Street and South Washington Railway (later, the Belt Railway) was a street railway company in Washington, D.C., from 1875 to 1898. The sixth and final company to start during the horsecar era, it operated on a loop, or "belt," around downtown and the National Mall. The company was purchased and absorbed by the Anacostia and Potomac River Railroad after a failed attempt to convert to a system that used compressed air for motive power.

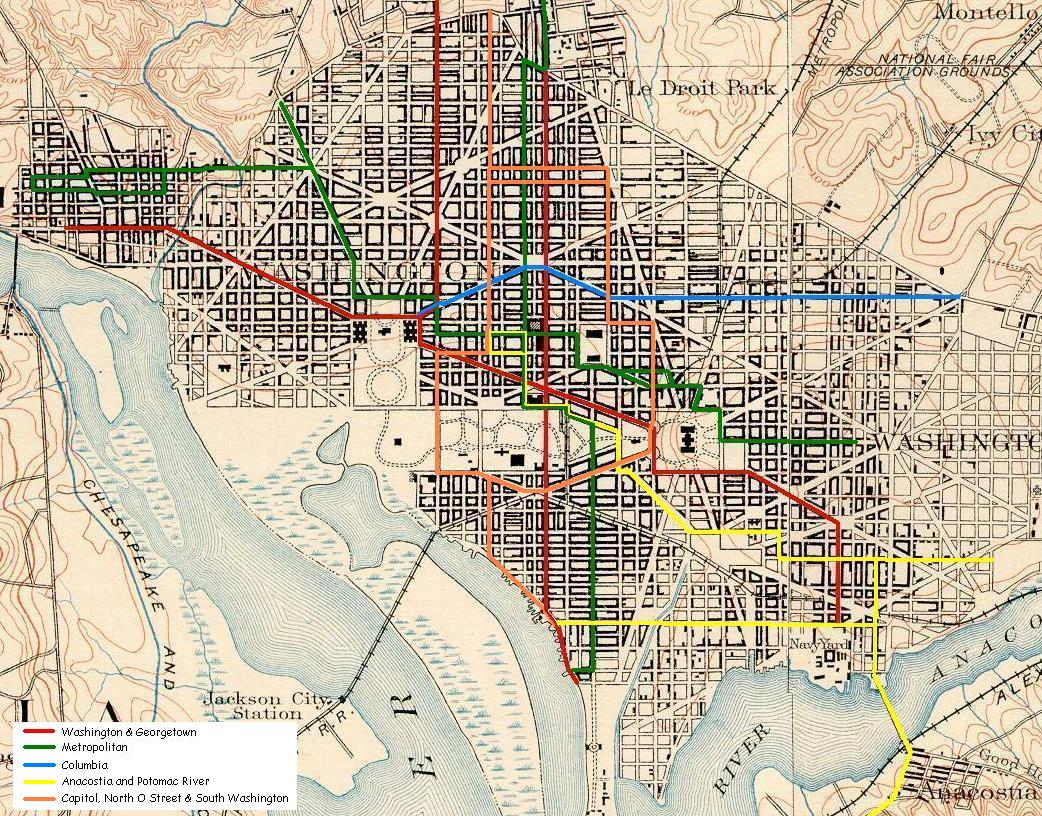
1888 map of the Washington, D.C. streetcar system at the end of the horsecar era

== Origins ==
The Capitol, North O Street and South Washington Railway Company was the last streetcar company to begin operations during Washington's horsecar era. It was incorporated on March 3, 1875, and began operation later that year. Known colloquially as the Belt Railway, its circular route went from the Capitol along 1st Street SW; south of the Mall on Maryland and Virginia Avenues SW; north on 12th Street SW/NW, the old Ohio Avenue NW (now obliterated by Federal Triangle) and 14th Street NW to O Street NW; east on O Street NW for ten blocks; and then south on 4th Street NW, G Street NW and 1st Street NW.

== Expansion and name change ==
The Capitol, North O Street and South Washington went through several changes after its initial startup. A P Street NW track was added in 1876 for westbound cars, leaving O Street NW for eastbound traffic. In 1881, the 11th street line was extended north to Boundary Street, which was then the city's northern boundary, and south to the water's edge: Water Street SW and along that street to the Arsenal. At the same time, tracks were rerouted across the Mall. The last change came on February 18, 1893, when it changed its name to the Belt Railway Company.

== Switch to electricity ==
In 1896, Congress directed the Belt Railway to try out compressed-air motors, just as it had the Eckington and Soldiers' Home Railway. The compressed-air motors were a failure that sent the company went into receivership.

On June 24, 1898, the Anacostia and Potomac River Railroad purchased and absorbed the Belt Railway. In 1899, the company's cars were equipped with the city's standard underground power system.
