= Anacostia and Potomac River Railroad =

American streetcar company

Overview
- Locale: Washington, D.C., U.S.
- Transit type: Horsecar (1875-1900); Streetcar (1900-1912)

Operation
- Began operation: 1875
- Ended operation: August 31, 1912

Technical
- Track gauge: 4 ft 8 1/2 in (1,435 mm) standard gauge

The Anacostia and Potomac River Railroad Company was the fourth streetcar company to operate in Washington, D.C., and the first to cross the Anacostia River. It was chartered in 1870, authorized by Congress in 1875 and built later that year. The line ran from the Arsenal (now Fort McNair) to Union Town (now Historic Anacostia). It expanded, adding lines to Congressional Cemetery, Central Market and to the Government Hospital for the Insane; and in the late 1890s it purchased two other companies and expanded their lines. It was reluctant to change its operations, but in 1900 it relented to pressure and became the last company to switch from horsecars to electric streetcars. It was one of the few companies not to be swept up by the two major streetcar companies at the turn of the 20th century, but it could not hold out forever and on August 31, 1912, it was purchased by the Washington Railway and Electric Company and ceased to operate as a unique entity.

== Origins ==
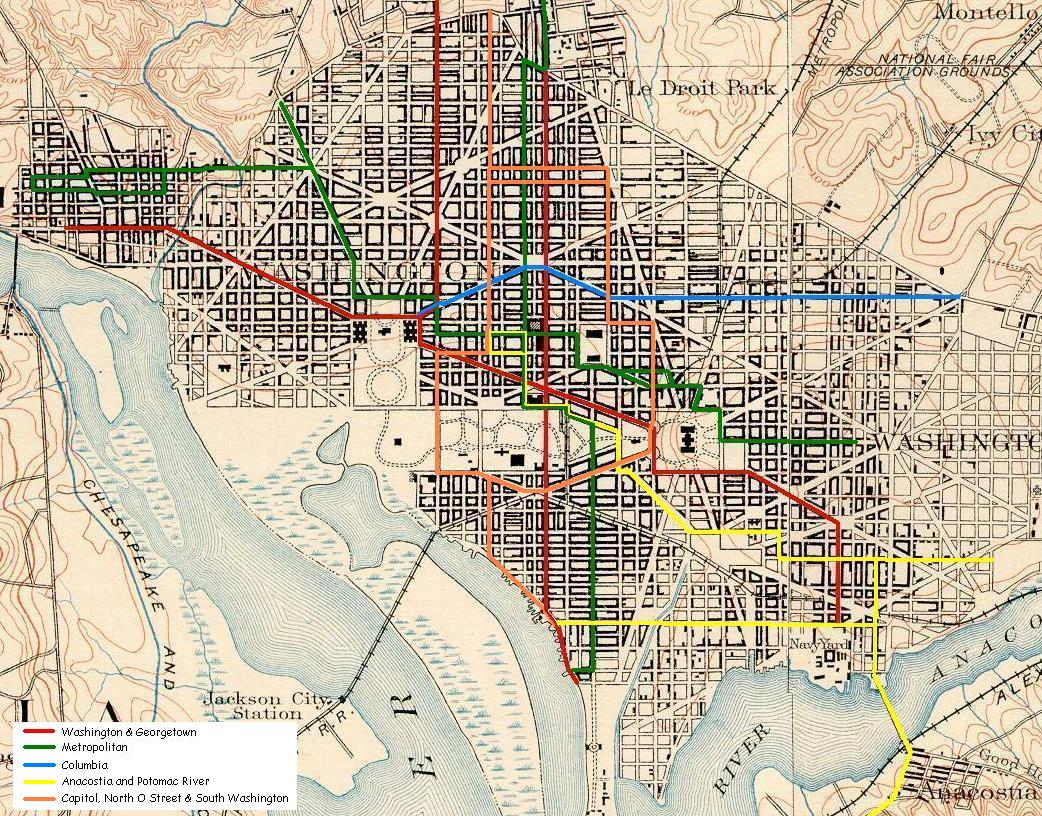
Map of the Washington, D.C. Streetcar System at the end of the Horse Car era in 1888

The Anacostia and Potomac River Railroad was chartered on May 5, 1870, given approval by Congress on February 18, 1875, and constructed across the Anacostia River later that year. The streetcars traveled from the Arsenal, along M Street SW/SE and 11th Street SE, and crossed the Navy Yard Bridge to Uniontown (now Historic Anacostia). The route then led down Nichols Avenue SE (now Martin Luther King Avenue) to V Street SE where a car barn and stables were maintained by the company.

== Expansion ==
On August 1, 1888, the railroad was permitted to expand from the Navy Yard to Congressional Cemetery along 11th Street SE and G Street SE, and past Garfield Park to the Center Market (now the National Archives) in downtown. It completed the expansion later that year. At the same time it was permitted to expand along Nichols Avenue past the Government Hospital for the Insane (now St. Elizabeths Hospital) to the District boundary, though it only made it as far as Alabama Avenue SE.

The next year, on June 24, 1898, the Anacostia and Potomac River continued its expansion by purchasing the Belt Railway and extended its 11 Street line from F street NW to Florida Avenue NW. In 1899, it purchased the Capital Railway.

The company came into a dispute with the Washington, Alexandria and Mount Vernon Railway over their shared use of track on Fourteenth Street. Following litigation that settled in April 1900, the two companies became joint owners of the track in the dispute with the Anacostia and Potomac to pay $18,000 for its share and to provide a 550 V power supply for the WA&MV streetcars to operate there.

== Switch to electric power ==
The company finally switched from horses to electric in April 1900. It was the last horse-drawn streetcar to run in the District.

== The end of the line ==
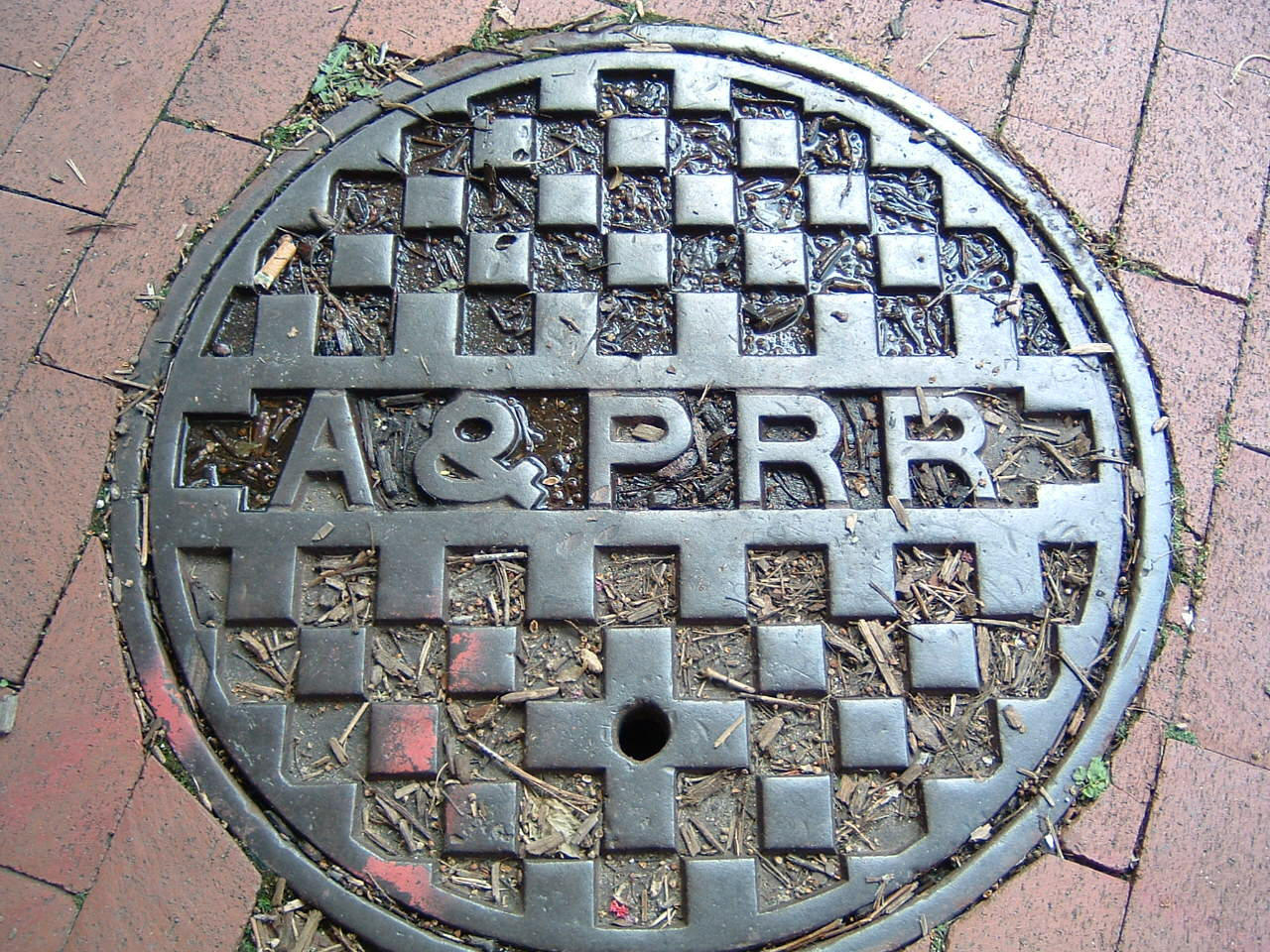
One of several extant manhole covers from the Anacostia and Potomac River Railroad Company

On June 5, 1899, the Anacostia and Potomac, along with eleven other companies in the area, became subsidiaries of the Washington Traction and Electric Company, which was incorporated on that date as a holding company to unify streetcar operations in the area. The holding company later merged with the Capital Traction Company in 1933. The Anacostia and Potomac River, though initially involved, avoided being wholly purchased during this period. Nonetheless, on August 31, 1912, the Washington Railway purchased the controlling stock of the Anacostia and Potomac River, and it ceased to run as a separate company.

In 1938, two lawsuits were brought against the Washington Railway by the bondholders of the Anacostia & Potomac to pay nearly $4,000,000 in bonds from the former company.
