= Baltimore and Washington Transit Company =

Interurban railway between Baltimore and Washington

The Baltimore and Washington Transit Company was an interurban railway incorporated in the U.S. state of Maryland in 1896 to connect Baltimore and Washington. Known locally as the Dinky Line, it reached no more than two miles and shut down in 1904.

Incorporated on April 7, 1896, the B&W Transit Company received authorization on June 8 to lay tracks in Washington, D.C., to a junction with the Brightwood Railway, whose branch to the Takoma neighborhood ran from its main line on Georgia Avenue east on Umatilla Street (today's Butternut Street NW) to 4th Street.

The B&W Transit company began construction the following year. From Umatilla Street, it ran south on 4th Street, turned east on Tahoe Street (today's Aspen Street NW) and continued on Spring Street (today's Laurel Street NW). Reaching Maryland, it continued on Ethan Allen Avenue until it reached the popular Wildwood Resort and Glen Sligo Hotel on Sligo Creek, which sat about midway between Elm Avenue and Sligo Creek Parkway, on what is Heather Avenue today. Transfers were given between the Brightwood and the B&W.

In 1903, the Takoma Park city council took over the lease given by the B&W Transit Company and the resort was closed for illegal gambling. The tracks were removed some two years later and the right-of-way reverted to the town. In 1920, the hotel was torn down and the property subdivided into individual lots. In 1937, the tracks were dismantled.

An extension southwest along Third Street Northwest and Kennedy Street to the end of Capital Traction's Fourteenth Street Line at Colorado Avenue was authorized on May 29, 1908. On March 4, 1914, the Maryland General Assembly changed the name to the Washington and Maryland Railway, and on May 2, 1918, it was leased by Capital Traction as the Washington and Maryland Line.
