= Washington and Georgetown Railroad =

American streetcar company

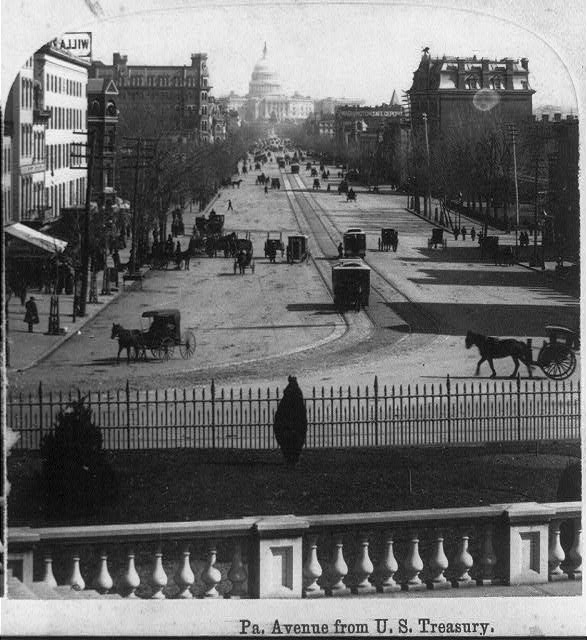
- Horsecars on Pennsylvania Avenue NW c. 1880

Operation
- Began operation: July 29, 1862
- Ended operation: September 21, 1895

The Washington and Georgetown Railroad Company (or Washington and Georgetown Railway Company) was the first streetcar company to operate in Washington, D.C., United States. It was incorporated and started operations in 1862, using horse-drawn cars on tracks between Georgetown and the Navy Yard. Two additional lines ran on 7th Street NW/SW and 14th Street NW. In 1890, it switched to cable cars. On September 21, 1895, the company was purchased by the Rock Creek Railway and the two formed the Capital Traction Company.

== History ==
=== Origins ===
In 1858, New York City businessmen began working to bring streetcar service to Washington, D.C., where transit consisted of horse-drawn omnibuses operated on several lines.

On May 17, 1862, the United States Congress enacted legislation that incorporated the first Washington streetcar company: the Washington and Georgetown Railroad ("Washington and Georgetown Railway Company", according to some official sources) and authorized it to build three street horsecar lines. Its officers included President Henry D. Cooke (brother of Civil War financier Jay Cooke); John Carter Marbury of Georgetown, George Gideon and Harris C. Fahnestock of Washington, D.C.; Edward W. Clark and J. Barlow Moorehead of Philadelphia; and William A. Darling of New York.

The W&GRC's first streetcar ran on Pennsylvania Avenue NW from the Capitol building to the State Department on July 29, 1862. Full operations, from the Navy Yard to Georgetown on Pennsylvania Avenue NW/SE, began on October 2, 1862. The horsecars traveled from the intersection of High Street and Bridge Street (today's Wisconsin Avenue NW and M Street NW) in Georgetown along Bridge Street to Pennsylvania Avenue.

The line then traveled along Pennsylvania Avenue and passed the White House and the foot of the Capitol. From there it went north on 1st St NW one block, then east on B St NW/NE for two blocks, then south across the grounds of the Capitol to its east and back onto Pennsylvania Avenue. It then traveled southeast on Pennsylvania to 8th St SE where it turned south to the Navy Yard, stopping at M St SE and 8th St SE.

=== Expansion ===
A second line opened on November 15, 1862. It was built along 7th Street NW from N Street NW to the Potomac River. The following year, the 7th Street line was extended north to Boundary Street NW. It expanded south to the Arsenal (now Fort McNair) in 1875. A third line, built by 1870, ran down 14th Street NW from Boundary Street NW (now Florida Avenue) to the Treasury Building.

In 1877, the company built a car barn at 13th and Boundary Streets NW. The company expanded the facility several times over the next 15 years, adding a blacksmith shop in 1878.

In 1877, the W&GRC bought the Old Buthcher's Market (formerly a tobacco warehouse) on the 3200 block of M Street for $40,000; the next year, it purchased the wharf across the canal on Grace Street for $6,000. Later in 1878, it began work on buildings on both properties. On the north side of the canal, on M Street, it built a two-story building with offices and a waiting room; a car house that could hold 70 cars; and on each side of the car house, a stable—one small and one large—which together could accommodate 360 horses and a shoeing shop. On the south side, on Grace Street, it built a three-story building with workshops, a granary, a hay barn, and storage space for machinery such as snow plows and summer cars, corn and hay bales. The building also held a 40-hp turbine wheel driven by the canal and machinery for steam power. The buildings were connected by a bridge three stories above the canal, enabling grain to move north to the stables and manure south to the canal. Work was completed in 1879.

The W&GRC competed with horse-drawn omnibus companies, or chariots, as they were known. It drove the Northern Liberty Chariot company to bankruptcy in 1877, but a new one that operated between Georgetown and Capitol Hill forced the W&GRC to lower prices. On Oct 14, 1879, the W&GRC bought out this second competitor, acquiring its stables on High Street (now Wisconsin Avenue) just south of the W&GCR shops on Grace.

=== Switch to cable cars ===
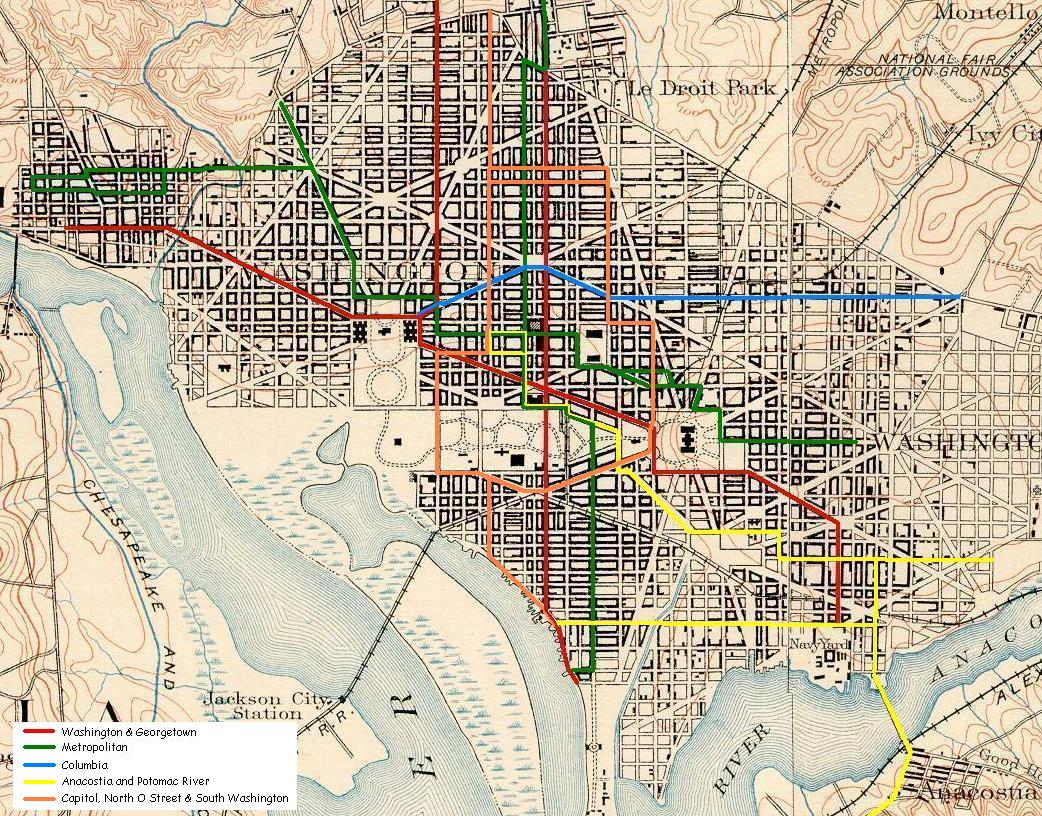
Map of Washington, D.C. streetcar lines in 1888, at the end of the horsecar era

On March 2, 1889, the District authorized every streetcar company in Washington to switch from horse power to underground cable or to electricity provided by battery or underground wires (overhead wires were banned). The following year, companies were authorized to sell stock to pay for the upgrades. In 1892, one-horse cars were banned within the city, and by 1894, Congress began requiring companies to switch from horse power.

Immediately after the 1889 law was passed, the Washington and Georgetown began installing an underground cable system, adding five new facilities to handle the cable operations. The 7th Street line was switched to a cable car system on April 12, 1890, with 16 cars traveling on the route at 6 mph (9.7 km/h) at three-minute intervals, from 5 a.m. to 1 a.m. daily. The entire system was in operation by August 18, 1892, with two cables pulling the cars up and down Pennsylvania Avenue NW/SE between the Navy Yard and Georgetown.

In 1892, the railroad extended its track along 14th to Mount Pleasant Street NW (now Park Road NW) and built a new barn there. It moved the cars from the barn at 13th Street and Florida Avenue NW to the new one and sold the older facility, which was converted into a printing plant.

In 1893, the company built the Navy Yard Car Barn across from the Navy Yard to service the new cars.

The company built two powerhouses to provide electricity for the system: one at 14th and E Streets NW and the other at 7th and P Streets SW. A large wheel pit was constructed in the middle of the intersection of 14th Street NW and Pennsylvania Avenue NW. On August 23, 1894, the company was authorized to extend its line on M Street NW to the Aqueduct Bridge, and build a "Union Station"—now the Georgetown Car Barn.

=== The end of the line ===
By the mid-1890s, there were numerous streetcar companies operating in the District. Congress tried to deal with this fractured transit system by requiring them to accept transfers and set standard pricing and by allowing them to use one another's track. But eventually it became clear that consolidation was the best solution. On March 1, 1895, Congress authorized the sale of the Washington and Georgetown Railroad to the Rock Creek Railway, a company with less operating revenue but more ability to raise money by issuing stock. The deal went through on September 21, 1895, forming the Capital Traction Company, the first company created during "the great streetcar consolidation".
