= MetroHero =

Transit app for Washington, D.C. area

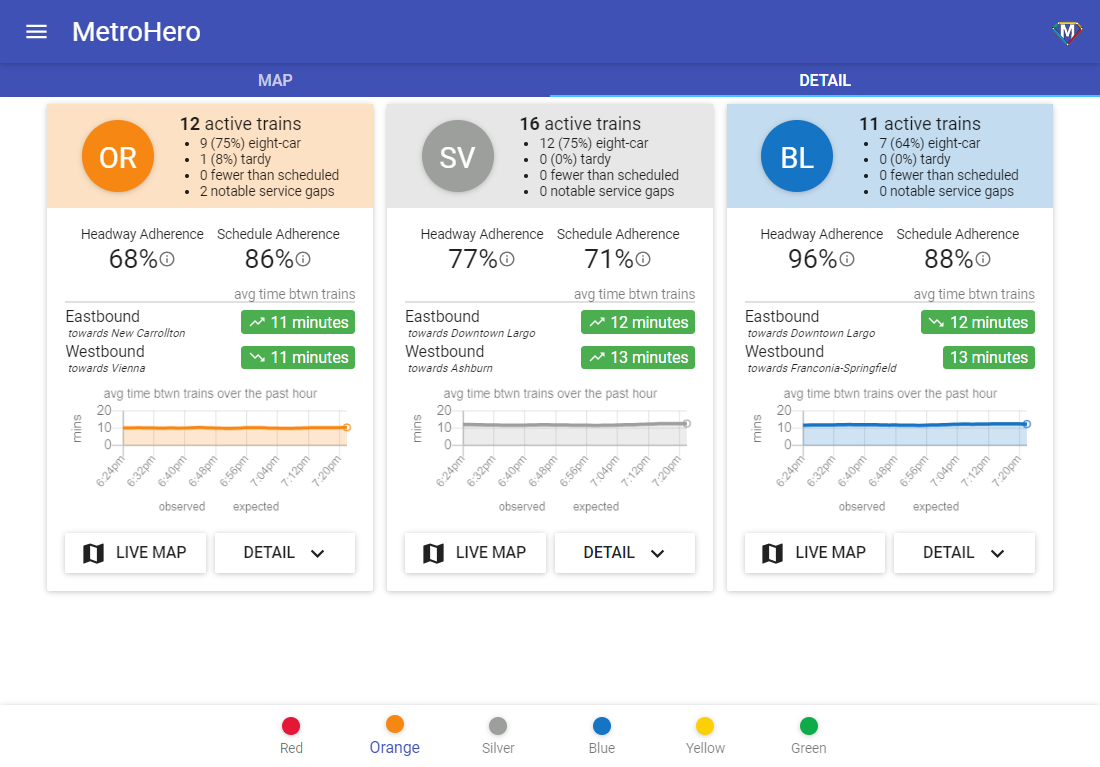
- Dashboard for Orange, Silver, and Blue Lines
- Developer(s): James Pizzurro; Jennifer Pizzurro
- Initial release: September 2015; 9 years ago
- Repository: github.com/jamespizzurro/metrohero-webapp; github.com/jamespizzurro/metrohero-server
- Written in: Java (server); JavaScript (web app)
- Operating system: Web app; Android; iOS
- Successor: MetroPulse; various forks
- License: GPL-3.0

MetroHero is a semi-defunct real-time transit tracking and performance analysis application for the Washington Metro rapid transit system. Originally available on iOS, Android, and the web, it allows users to view live maps of all trains on a specific line, summary statistics relating to real-time system performance, and user feedback on current Metro conditions.

The app launched in 2015, followed by ARIES for Transit, a related project from the same developers, and continued functioning until its original developers shut it down in 2023. Afterwards, forks of the application went live to allow for its continued public use, and the Washington Metropolitan Area Transit Authority (WMATA), Metro's operator, announced that it would launch a similar app. The app has been described by local news media as popular and well-liked among Washington, D.C.-area residents.

== History and main development ==
MetroHero was initially developed by James and Jennifer Pizzurro, who both attended George Washington University and studied computer science. They said that they were inspired to create the app after experiencing train delays and searching for an app to track a train after boarding; such an app did not exist for the Washington Metro. The development of the app was not endorsed by WMATA, but it did use publicly available data from the agency.

MetroHero launched as an Android application in September 2015, followed by the release of an iOS-compatible web app in December of that year. A standalone iOS app launched in April 2018, but the web app remained supported. By April 2018, MetroHero had approximately 13,000 monthly active users. James Pizzurro has stated that the app's intended audience was regular Metro commuters who wanted to communicate with each other about active problems, as opposed to tourists and riders who only wanted train time data.

Throughout the application's development, the Pizzurros had been advocates for Metro's transparency with riders and the community by providing more high-quality data and taking on the feedback of developers. In particular, they criticized Metro's reluctance to uniquely identify individual train trips and its decision to obscure data under certain circumstances, which have posed problems for MetroHero's data collection.

In addition to their work on MetroHero, the app's developers led or participated in other initiatives related to transit in the Greater Washington area. In 2019, MetroHero partnered with a local transit group to analyze Metrobus data and publish a "Metrobus Report Card", along with proposed goals and recommendations based on the report's findings. Based on this experience, MetroHero's developers began a sister project, the Adherence + Reliability + Integrity Evaluation System for Transit (ARIES for Transit), which displays data and issues grades for Washington- and Baltimore-area transit systems. Separately, James Pizzurro used MetroHero data to inform Rail Transit OPS, an independent Metro oversight group, and assist in its documentation of Metro system incidents.

== Application ==
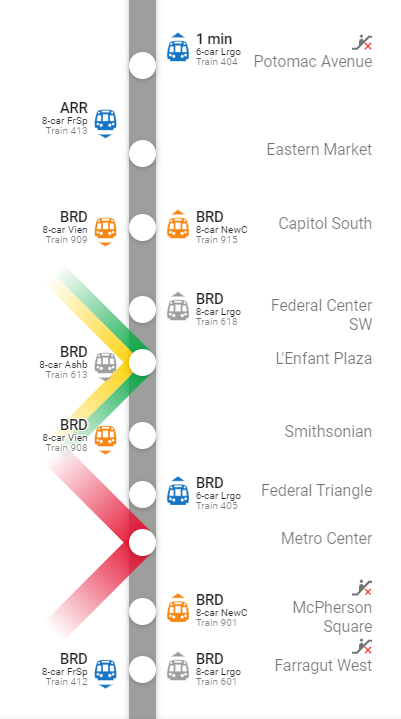
Line map view for a part of the Silver Line

The MetroHero application uses several interfaces, including an overall dashboard and a live map, to display data to its users. On the dashboard, system-wide train summary data, such as the number of operating trains and headway adherence, is visible. The map offers a visual representation of all trains' positions throughout the system, filtered by line. Individual stations and trains can be selected to see ratings and comments provided by other users, including both positive and negative notes like cleanliness and crowdedness. Additionally, a list of train wait times is given, along with aggregate data like average wait time. Any train delays or service incidents are visible in the app.

MetroHero uses several data sources for the various components of its application. Train positions and other operational data are provided by WMATA as part of its initiative to release open data for third-party developers. However, MetroHero's developers noted that the Metro-provided information is sometimes inaccurate and incomplete, thereby limiting the accuracy of MetroHero. The app also collects crowdsourced data from its users, who can report conditions in train cars and stations and add to reports sent by other people. Additionally, MetroHero parses data from Twitter feeds to learn about system incidents, including delays and fires.

In addition to the web app, Android app, and iOS app, MetroHero's initial developers maintained automated social media accounts that alerted customers about Metro service; these accounts were discontinued upon the original app's eventual shutdown. MetroHero also hosts archived performance data for later review, a feature that is sometimes used after major incidents.

== Shutdown and future ==
In February 2023, James Pizzurro announced that MetroHero would be shut down on July 1, 2023, citing "positive changes ... in the app landscape and in WMATA's data management and communication" and the costs and time associated with maintaining the app. Shortly before the application's end date, the Pizzurros shared MetroHero's source code on GitHub, which prompted others to fork the code and begin maintaining new instances of MetroHero to succeed the original app. The original website went offline on July 1, as planned.

Historically, WMATA has not offered its own real-time map or similar service, citing other apps from third parties which accomplished the same task. (Note: Metro has offered web apps to track an individual rider's previous trips, but these did not provide live tracking.) However, on June 30, 2023, Randy Clarke, WMATA's general manager, announced that Metro would begin offering a similar service as MetroHero did. The app, initially named MetroMeter, was planned to begin operating in early July and would provide real-time information on trains, headways, and service schedules. Metro also noted its intentions to extend this service to Metrobus and MetroAccess. On July 20, Metro announced that the app had been renamed to MetroPulse and launched it in beta.

MetroHero's other project, ARIES for Transit, was not affected by the shutdown.

== Reception ==
MetroHero was generally well-received and has been recognized for its usage among Washington-area commuters. DCist called it one of the "most praised" Metro tracking apps, and WMATA publicly acknowledged its popularity when announcing its decision to establish MetroPulse. Chris Barnes, a member of the Metro Riders' Advisory Council, said that the app is considered important among riders because it fulfills a need for riders to have reliable and transparent transit information, albeit somewhat hindered by flaws in WMATA's data.
