= Metrobus fleet (Washington, D.C.) =

Listing of WMATA Metrobus fleet

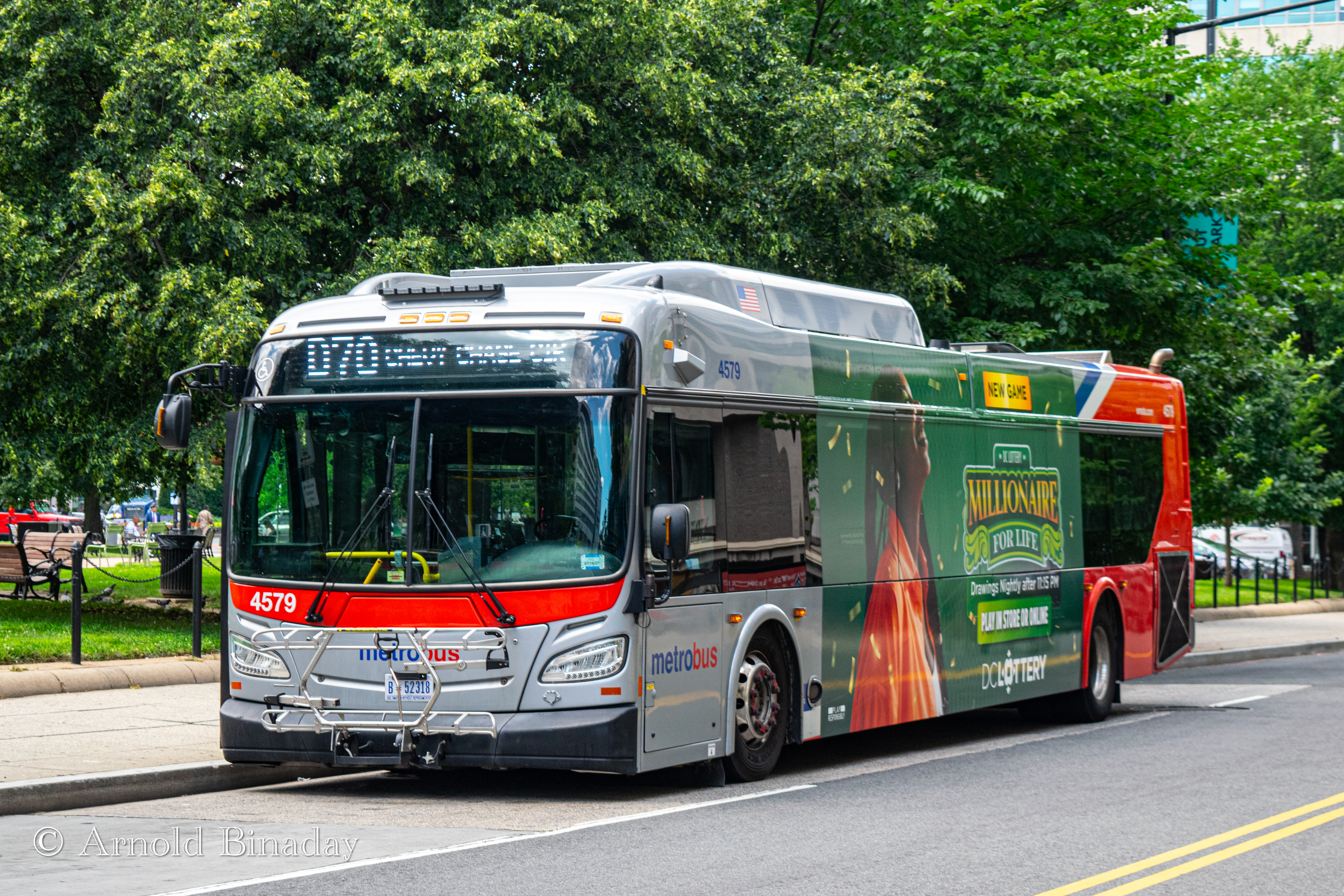
The New Flyer Xcelsior is the predominant bus model in the Metrobus fleet.

This is a roster of the bus fleet of Metrobus, the fixed-route bus service run by the Washington Metropolitan Area Transit Authority in Washington, D.C.

The Metrobus fleet is the sixth-largest bus fleet in the United States. It provides more than 130 million passenger trips per year in Washington, D.C., Maryland, and Virginia. As of 2020, the current Metrobus fleet consists of 1,571 buses of varying fuel types including diesel, compressed natural gas, diesel-electric hybrid, and battery-electric. The buses in the fleet are assigned to one of eight bus divisions located throughout the area, with a ninth division currently under construction. WMATA has a plan to move to a fully electric bus fleet by 2045.

== Current fleet ==
Image	Builder and model	Model year	Length	Numbers (Total)	Vehicles in service	Engine	Transmission	Notes
	New Flyer; DE40LFA Low Floor Advanced	2010–2011	42 ft (13 m)	6462–6609 (148 buses)	129	Cummins ISL EPA 2007	Allison EP40 Hybrid System	Replaced the remaining Flxible Metro B, D, and E Units.; Some are painted in the MetroExtra livery.; Six units were sold to Fairfax Connector in 2021, and retired in 2024.; 6512 is out of service due to an incident involving a pedestrian being struck while not in service and deadheading at the time to start a route C85 trip on November 19, 2026.; Rehabilitated and repainted; Scheduled to be replaced by the incoming 2026-27 XDE40s.
	New Flyer; Xcelsior XDE40	2011–2012	40 ft (12 m)	7001–7152 (152 buses)	149	Cummins ISL9 EPA 2010 (7001–7100) Cummins ISB6.7 EPA 2010 (7101–7152)	Allison H 40EP Hybrid System (7001–7100) BAE Systems HybriDrive HDS200 (7101–7152)	Replaced some of the 1997 Orion Vs.; Rehabbed and repainted; Some units relegated to operator training.; 7051, 7095 and 7100 retired due to accident damages.; 7086-7100 wore the MetroExtra Livery until 2020.; Scheduled to be replaced by incoming 2026-27 XDE40s.
	New Flyer; Xcelsior XDE40	2012–2013	40 ft (12 m)	7153–7272 (120 buses)	116	Cummins ISL9 EPA 2010,2013	Allison H 40EP Hybrid System	Originally intended to replace the remaining 1997 Orion Vs, however ended up replacing the Orion VIs after a series of fires forced their early retirement.; 7215 retired due to accident damage.; 7219 is out of service after crashing into a restaurant on Q Street in April 2026.; 7249 is out of service due to an unknown incident that occurred on January 13, 2026.; Scheduled to be replaced by incoming 2026-27 XDE40s.
	New Flyer; Xcelsior XDE60 articulated	2015	60 ft (18 m)	5460–5480 (21 buses)	19	Cummins ISL9 330HP EPA 2013	Allison H 50EP Hybrid System	Replaced the Neoplan AN460s.; 5465 retired after being destroyed in a fire while heading in the 9th Street Tunnel in April 2026.
	New Flyer; Xcelsior XN40	2015–2016	40 ft (12 m)	2830–2993 (164 buses)	162	Cummins-Westport ISL-G EPA 2013	Allison World B400R6	Replaced the New Flyer C40LFs.; 2915 and 2975 retired due to accident damages.; 2981-2993 were painted in the MetroWay scheme from 2016-2025.
	New Flyer; Xcelsior XDE40	2015–2016	40 ft (12 m)	7300–7409 (110 buses)	108	Cummins ISL9 EPA 2013	Allison H 40EP Hybrid System	Replaced the remaining 1997 Orion Vs and some of the 2000 Orion Vs.; Originally ordered under NABI for additional 42-BRTs, but the order changed to NFI XDE40s due to NFI acquiring NABI in 2014.; 7361 is out of service due to accident damage.; 7405 is out of service due to an unknown incident that occurred on February 28, 2026.
	New Flyer; Xcelsior XN40	2018	40 ft (12 m)	3100–3199 (100 buses)	100	Cummins-Westport ISL-G NZ EPA 2017	Allison World B400R6	Replaced some of the Orion VII CNGs
	New Flyer; Xcelsior XDE60 articulated	2018	60 ft (18 m)	5481–5492 (12 buses)	12	Cummins L9 330HP EPA 2017	Allison H 50EP Hybrid System	Ordered as supplementary units, using options from the 2015/2016 order.
	New Flyer; Xcelsior XN40	2019	40 ft (12 m)	3200–3274 (75 buses)	75	Cummins-Westport L9N EPA 2017	Allison World B400R6	Replaced some of the Orion VII CNGs.
	New Flyer; Xcelsior XD40	2019	40 ft (12 m)	4450–4474 (25 buses)	25	Cummins L9 280HP EPA 2017	Allison B3400xFE	Replaced some of the 2000 Orion Vs.
	New Flyer; Xcelsior XD40	2020	40 ft (12 m)	4475–4499 (25 buses)	23	Cummins L9 280HP EPA 2020	Allison B3400xFE	Replaced WMATA's last-remaining Orion Vs, resulting in an all low-floor fleet.; 4499 is out of service after crashing into a utility pole on Bunker Hill Road in February 2025.
	New Flyer; Xcelsior XN40	2020	40 ft (12 m)	3275–3349 (75 buses)	73	Cummins-Westport L9N EPA 2020	Allison World B400R6	Replaced the remaining Orion VII CNGs and some of the New Flyer C40LFRs.; 3299 is out of service due to an unknown incident that occurred on February 18, 2026 on the C51.
	New Flyer; Xcelsior XD60 articulated	2020–2021	60 ft (18 m)	5500–5541 (42 buses)	42	Cummins L9 330HP (5500–5509) 380HP (5511–5541) EPA 2020/2021	Allison World B500R6	Replaced the NABI 60-BRTs and the New Flyer DE60LFAs.
	New Flyer; Xcelsior XD40	2021	40 ft (12 m)	4500–4598 (99 buses)	98	Cummins L9 280HP EPA 2021	Allison B3400xFE	Replaced the New Flyer DE40LFs, DE40LFRs and some of the D40LFRs.; 4506 is out of service after colliding head on with 5329, a Montgomery County Ride On 2009 Gillig LF40 Hybrid, in the Silver Spring Transit Center in November 2024.
	New Flyer; Xcelsior XD40	2022	40 ft (12 m)	4600–4700 (101 buses)	101	Cummins L9 280HP EPA 2021	Allison B3400xFE	Originally intended to replace the remaining New Flyer D40LFRs, but ended up replacing some of the 2008/2009 DE40LFAs.
	New Flyer; Xcelsior XD40	2023	40 ft (12 m)	4701–4795 (95 buses)	94	Cummins L9 330HP EPA 2021	Allison B3400xFE	Replaced the New Flyer D40LFRs and the 2008/2009 DE40LFAs.; 4731 is out of service due to an unknown incident that occurred on September 20, 2025 on the M22.
	New Flyer; Xcelsior CHARGE NG XE60	2023	60 ft (18 m)	1060–1061 (2 buses)	0 (inactive)	Siemens ELFA-3	Direct Drive	WMATA's first articulated electric buses.; Both units are currently out of service due to a battery safety recall issued by New Flyer Industries.; As of October 2026 both units are undergoing road testing and are preparing to return to revenue service.
	New Flyer; Xcelsior CHARGE NG XE40	2024	40 ft (12 m)	1045–1049 (5 buses)	5	Accelera by Cummins ELFA-3	Direct Drive	10 buses to be housed at the Shepherd Parkway division.
	Nova Bus; LFSe+	2025	40 ft (12 m)	1040–1044 (5 buses)	5	BAE Systems GPM-12	Direct-Drive	10 buses to be housed at the Shepherd Parkway division.; WMATA's only NovaBus order, and amongst some of the last LFSe+ units built for the US Market.
	New Flyer; Xcelsior XDE40	2026	40 ft (12 m)	26400-26474 (75 buses)	23	Cummins B6.7 EPA 2024	Allison eGen Flex H 40 Max	First WMATA buses to use the Allison eGen Flex hybrid system transmission.; 26433 Displayed at the annual APTA event in Chicago in October 2026.; Currently being delivered.; To replace the remaining New Flyer LFAs and 2011-13 XDE40s.; Some units started entering service on August 31, 2026.

=== Future fleet ===
Builder and model name	Length	Year	Fleet number	Fuel type	Notes
New Flyer; Xcelsior CHARGE NG XE35	35 ft (11 m)	TBA	TBA (25 buses)	Battery electric	To be completed from Q4 2024 backlog order.
New Flyer; Xcelsior XDE40	40 ft (12 m)	2027–30	TBD (75 buses)	Diesel-electric hybrid	WMATA has exercised its second-year option for 100 new hybrid and electric buses as part of an on-going five-year contract for 500 new buses.
New Flyer; Xcelsior XE40	40 ft (12 m)	2027–30	TBD (25 buses)	Battery electric	WMATA has exercised its second-year option for 100 new hybrid and electric buses as part of an on-going five-year contract for 500 new buses.
TBA	60 ft (18 m)	TBA	TBA	TBA	WMATA issued a Request for Information (RFI) in April 2026 for new 60 ft articulated buses; manufacturer and order details TBA.

== Retired fleet ==
These buses were served by WMATA at one point but were replaced by newer and more efficient buses after serving at least 8 years. Some buses were preserved and some were acquired by museums, while the rest of the fleets were scrapped.

Year	Builder and model name	Numbers (preserved numbers)	Year Retired	Picture	Engine	Transmission	Notes
1959	General Motors; New Look	4920–4944, 5700–5774	1990s–2000				
1960	General Motors; New Look	2525–2539, 4700–4799	1990s–2000				
1961	General Motors; New Look	2540–2554, 3324–3325	1990s–2000				
1962	General Motors; New Look	1301–1324, 2555–2569, 3301–3313, 5800–5874, 5900–5974	1990s–2000				
1963	General Motors; New Look	1401–1420, 3314–3318, 6300–6381 (1400)	1990s–2000				
1963–1964	General Motors; New Look	3526–3527	1990s–2000				
1964	General Motors; New Look	1431–1440, 2570–2577, 3319–3323, 3401–3405, 6400–6499	1990s–2000				One is preserved by the Seashore Trolley Museum.
1965	General Motors; New Look	2578–2607, 3250–3251, 3501–3525, 6500–6579	1990s–2000				
1966	General Motors; New Look	2608–2624, 3601–3635, 6600–6699	1990s–2000				
1967	General Motors; New Look	1451–1473, 2625–2640, 6700–6724 (1461)	1990s–2000				
1968–1969	General Motors; New Look	3801–3840	1990s–2000				
1970–1971	General Motors; New Look	1001–1030	1990s–2000				
1972	General Motors; New Look	1101–1130	1990s–2000				
1973–1974	General Motors; New Look	1151–1180	1990s–2000				
1974–1975	AM General; Metropolitan	7000–7619	1990s		Detroit Diesel 8V71N	Allison VS1-8 and VS2-8	One is preserved by the Virginia Commonwealth Coach and Trolley Museum.
1976–1978	Flxible Corporation; New Looks (53096 Models)	8000–8661	1999–2001		Detroit Diesel 6V71N and 8V71N	Allison V730	
1979	General Motors Corporation; RTS II	9001–9115 (9112)	2000–2001		Detroit Diesel 6V92TA	Allison V730	
1979	MAN; SG 220	5001–5043	1995		MAN D2566 MLUM	Renk-Doromat 874A	First articulated buses for WMATA.
1983–1984	Neoplan USA; AN440A	9500–9576	1994		Detroit Diesel 6V92TA	Allison HT-747	
1983	MAN; SG 310	5101–5133	2002		MAN D2566 MLUM	Renk-Doromat 874B	
1986–1987	Flxible; Metro A	8700–8922, 8950–8975	2005–2006		Detroit Diesel 6V92TA	Allison V731	
1988	Flxible; Metro B	9201–9239, 9251–9289	2005–2006		Detroit Diesel 6V92TA	Allison V731	
1988	Gillig; Phantom 30ft	5080–5099	2001		Detroit Diesel 6V92TA	Allison HTB-748	One is preserved by the Seashore Trolley Museum.; Only Gillig order for WMATA
1989	Flxible; Metro B	5151–5185	2006		Detroit Diesel 6V92TA	Allison V731	One is preserved by the Virginia Commonwealth Coach and Trolley Museum.
1990	Flxible; Metro B	9301–9413	2010		Cummins L10	Voith DIWA D863.2	
1990	Flxible; Metro B	9421–9463	2006–2007		Cummins L10	Voith DIWA D863.2	
1991	Flxible; Metro B	9481–9498	2009		Cummins L10	Voith DIWA D863.2	.
1992	Bus Industries of America; Orion V (05.501)	9601–9660	2008		Detroit Diesel Series 50 EGR	Voith DIWA D864.3E	
1993	Flxible; Metro D	9701–9785	2010		Cummins M11E	Voith DIWA D863.3	Replaced by the 2010/2011 DE42LFAs.
1994	Flxible; Metro D	9801–9835	2010		Detroit Diesel Series 50	Voith DIWA D863.3	Replaced by the 2010/2011 DE42LFAs.
1995	Flxible; Metro E	4001–4104	2010		Detroit Diesel Series 50	Allison VR731RH	Replaced by the 2010/2011 DE42LFAs.
1995	North American Bus Industries (American Ikarus); 436.06	5201–5245	2009–2011		Cummins M11E EPA 1995	Voith DIWA D864.3	
1997–1998	Orion Bus Industries; Orion V (05.501)	4200–4412 (4271)	2014–2016		Detroit Diesel Series 50	Allison World B400R5	Replaced by the 2014/2015 NABI 42-BRTs and the 2011 and 2015/2016 XDE40s.
1999	Orion Bus Industries; Orion V (05.505)	3900–3950	2012		Detroit Diesel Series 50	Allison World B400R5	
1999–2000	Orion Bus Industries; Orion II (02.501)	3701–3742	2008–2009		Cummins ISB	Allison AT-545	
2000	Orion Bus Industries; Orion VI (06.501)	2000–2099	2012		Detroit Diesel Series 50	Allison World B400R5	First low floor buses for WMATA.; Suddenly retired after engine fires took place on two buses in a span of five days.; Replaced by the 2012/2013 XDE40s.
2000	Orion Bus Industries; Orion V (05.501)	2100–2231	2018–2020		Detroit Diesel Series 50	Allison World B400R5	Last order of 40-ft high-floor buses for WMATA.; Replaced by the 2019-2020 XD40s, and the 2015/2016 XDE40s.
2001–2002	New Flyer Industries; C40LF Low Floor	2300–2399, 2401–2464	2015–2016		Cummins-Westport C-Gas Plus EPA 2004 (2300–2462), Doosan GK-12 (2463), John Deere 6081H (2464)	Allison World B400R5	First CNG buses for WMATA and the New Flyer buses in the fleet.; Replaced by the 2015/2016 XN40s.
2002	Thomas Dennis; SLF230	3951–3954	2009		Cummins ISB EPA 2000	Allison World B300R5	Transferred to Arlington Transit on July 6, 2009, and were renumbered to 5296–5299, later repainted to the ART scheme in 2010, when the GEORGE bus system was suspended, and retired between 2012 and 2013.
2002–2003	Neoplan USA; AN460 (articulated)	5301–5321	2015–2016		Detroit Diesel Series 60 330HP	Allison World B500R5	Last high-floor buses for WMATA.; Replaced by the 2015/2016 XDE60s.
2005–2006	DaimlerChrysler; Commercial Buses; Orion VII (07.501) CNG	2501–2685, 2701–2730	2018–2020		Cummins-Westport C-Gas Plus EPA 2004	Voith DIWA D864.3E	Replaced by the 2018-2020 XN40s.
2005–2006	DaimlerChrysler; Commercial Buses; Orion VII (07.503) CNG	3001–3035	2020–2021		Cummins-Westport C-Gas Plus EPA 2004	Voith DIWA D864.3E	Mainly replaced by the 2019/2020 XN40s, with all units being retired by 2021.; Several units used for training at the CET until around 2022-2023.
2005–2006	New Flyer Industries; DE40LF Low Floor	6001–6039	2021		Cummins ISL EPA 2004	Allison EP40 Hybrid System	First diesel-electric hybrid buses for WMATA.; Replaced by the 2021 XD40s.
2006	New Flyer Industries; DE40LFR Low Floor Restyled	6040–6050	2021		Cummins ISL EPA 2004	Allison EP40 Hybrid System	One was repainted into the MetroExtra livery following an accident in 2009.; Replaced by the 2021 XD40s.
2006	New Flyer Industries; D40LFR Low Floor Restyled	6101–6217	2021–2024		Cummins ISM EPA 2004	Voith DIWA D864.3E	Replaced by the 2021-2023 XD40s.; 6181 preserved by the Commonwealth Coach and Trolley Museum.; Last WMATA Buses to use Voith DIWA Transmission.
2007	New Flyer Industries; C40LFR Low Floor Restyled	2801–2825	2020–2023		Cummins-Westport C-Gas Plus EPA 2004	Voith DIWA D864.3E	WMATA's Longest-Serving CNG buses, running for 16 Years.; 2801-2810 replaced by XN40s in 2020.; Remaining units withdrawn in 2023 due to CNG Tank Expiration.
2008	North American Bus Industries; 60-BRT articulated	5401–5422	2021		Cummins-Westport ISL-G 320HP EPA 2007	Allison World B500R6	First buses to be delivered in the Local livery.; Only 60ft CNG Buses operated by WMATA.; Replaced by the 2020/2021 XD60s.
2008-2009	New Flyer Industries; DE40LFA Low Floor Advanced	6301–6461	2021–2025		Cummins ISL EPA 2007	Allison EP40 Hybrid System	Replaced by the 2022/2023 XD40s.; Last Units retired in Spring 2025.; Several units sold to Prince George's County Transit (TheBus) in 2025.
2009	New Flyer Industries; DE35LFA Low Floor Advanced	3751–3770	2025		Cummins ISL EPA 2007	Allison EP40 Hybrid System	Retired in June 2025 due to the Better Bus Network Redesign making 30 and 35 foot buses obsolete.
2009	New Flyer Industries; DE60LFA articulated Low Floor Advanced	5431–5452	2021		Cummins ISL 330HP EPA 2007	Allison EP50 Hybrid System	Replaced by the 2020/2021 XD60s.; 2 units were used for training after retirement.
2012	Daimler Commercial Buses; Orion VII; EPA10 BRT 30ft	3036–3062	2025		Cummins ISL9 EPA 2010	Allison World B400R6	Diesel Units.; Retired in June 2025 due to the Better Bus Network Redesign making 30 and 35 foot buses obsolete.
2012	Daimler Commercial Buses; Orion VII; EPA10 BRT 30ft	3063–3087	2025		Cummins ISB6.7 EPA 2010	BAE Systems HybriDrive HDS200 Hybrid System	Diesel-Hybrid Units.; Retired in June 2025 due to the Better Bus Network Redesign making 30 and 35 foot buses obsolete.; Several Units sold to Fairfax Connector.
2014-2015	North American Bus Industries; 42-BRT	8001–8105	2026		Cummins ISL9 EPA 2013	Allison H40EP Hybrid System	Largest NABI Hybrid Order.; Withdrawn from Normal service in 2025 and used as a reserve fleet until full retirement in Spring 2026.; 2 units retired early due to accident damage.
2016	New Flyer; Xcelsior CHARGE XE40	1001	2024		Siemens ELFA-2	XALT Energy 200 Lithium-Ion Batteries	First all-electric transit bus for WMATA.; Returned to New Flyer in 2024, then sold for scrap in 2026.

== Divisions ==
Division	Areas served	Notes
Andrews Federal Center	Southwest DC, Prince George's County	Opened on June 23, 2019.
Bladensburg	Northeast, Southeast DC and Northwest DC	Currently rebuilding.
Cinder Bed Road	City of Alexandria, Fairfax County	Opened in 2018, formerly operated by the private contractor Transdev between August 2018 and December 2021.
Four Mile Run	Arlington County, Fairfax County, City of Alexandria	
Landover	Prince George's County	
Montgomery	Montgomery County	
Shepherd Parkway	Southeast and Southwest DC, Prince George's County	Opened in 2012: CNG fueling was installed.
Western	Northwest DC	Planned to be replaced.

=== Closed divisions ===
Division	Areas served	Notes
Arlington	Arlington County, Fairfax County	Closed in 2009, replaced by West Ox Division.
Northern	Northwest DC	Former trolley barn for the Capital Traction Company; closed on June 23, 2019, due to structural issues, planned to be rebuilt.
Southeastern	Southeast and Southwest DC	Closed in 2008; operations moved to Southern Avenue until the Shepherd Parkway Division opened in 2012.
Southern Avenue Annex	Southeast DC, Prince George's County	Closed in 2024; operated on weekdays only, formerly known as "Prince George's" Division up until 1989.
Royal Street	Fairfax County, City of Alexandria	Closed in 2014, Replaced by the Cinder Bed Division. Demolished in January 2020.
West Ox	Arlington County, Fairfax County	Operated on weekdays only and was shared with Fairfax Connector. Temporarily closed on March 14, 2021; all the operations were moved to the Four Mile Run Division.
