= Metrobus (Washington, D.C.) =

Bus service in DC, Maryland, and Virginia, US

WMATA Metrobus

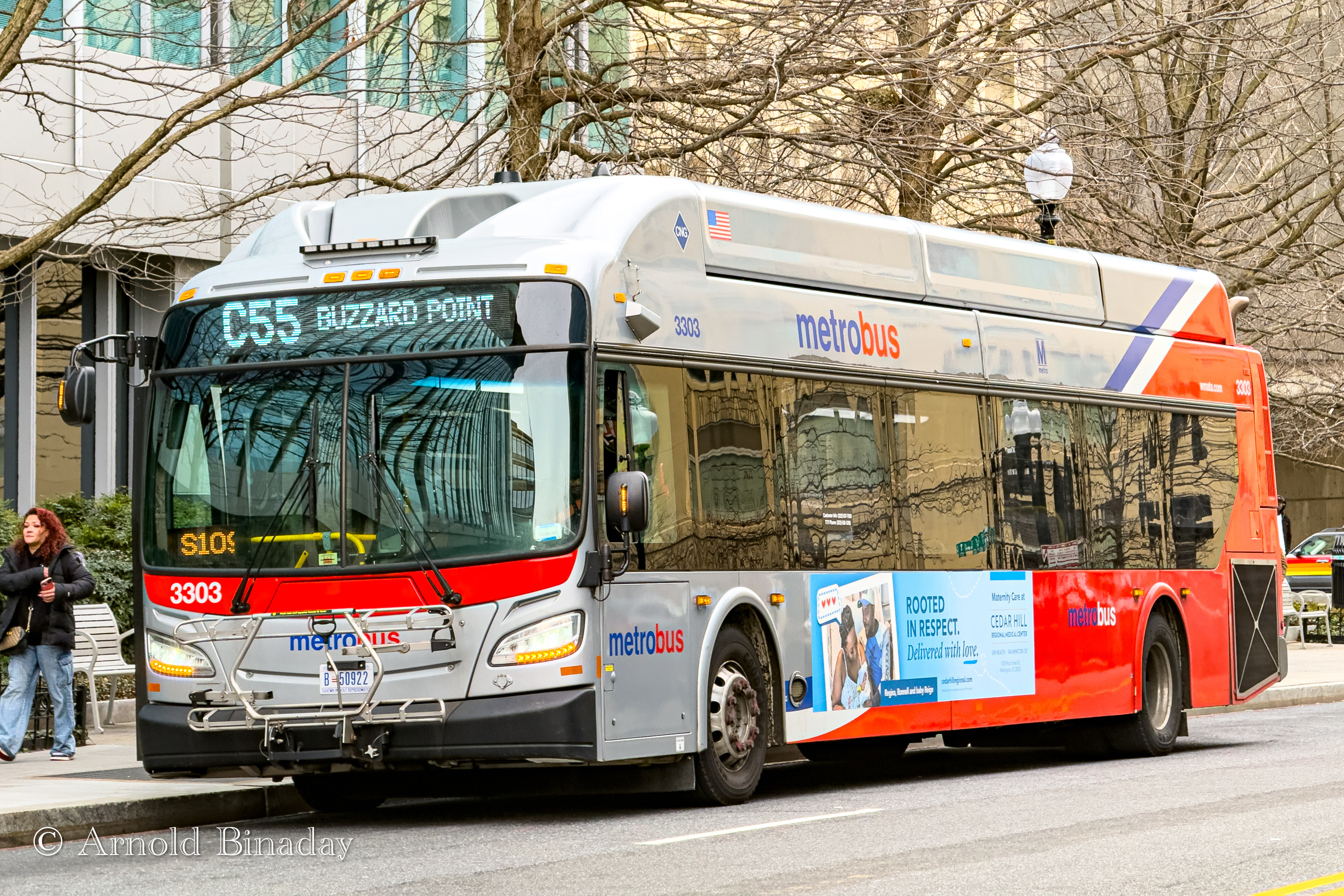
- Metrobus at L'Enfant Plaza station in 2026
- Parent: Washington Metropolitan Area Transit Authority
- Commenced operation: February 4, 1973; 53 years ago
- Headquarters: 300 7th Street SW, L'Enfant Plaza, Washington, D.C. 20024
- Service area: Washington metropolitan area
- Service type: Local; Express; Limited-stop; Bus rapid transit
- Routes: 125
- Stops: 9,000 (approximate)
- Fleet: 1,595
- Daily ridership: 384,200 (weekdays, Q2 2026)
- Annual ridership: 118,749,200 (2025)
- Fuel type: Diesel, Diesel-electric Hybrid, CNG, Electric
- Operator: WMATA
- General manager: Randy Clarke
- Website: wmata.com/service/bus

Metrobus is a bus service operated by the Washington Metropolitan Area Transit Authority (WMATA), serving Washington, D.C. and parts of Maryland and Virginia in the Washington metropolitan area. Metrobus operates local, limited-stop, and bus rapid transit services within its service area, complementing the Washington Metro and multiple independent bus operators. Its fleet consists of 1,595 buses, covering an area of 1,500 square miles (3,900 km^{2}).

Metrobus began operation in 1973, as the successor to four failing privately owned bus companies. In 2025, the system had a ridership of 118,749,200, or about 384,200 per weekday as of the second quarter of 2026.

== History ==
=== Predecessors ===
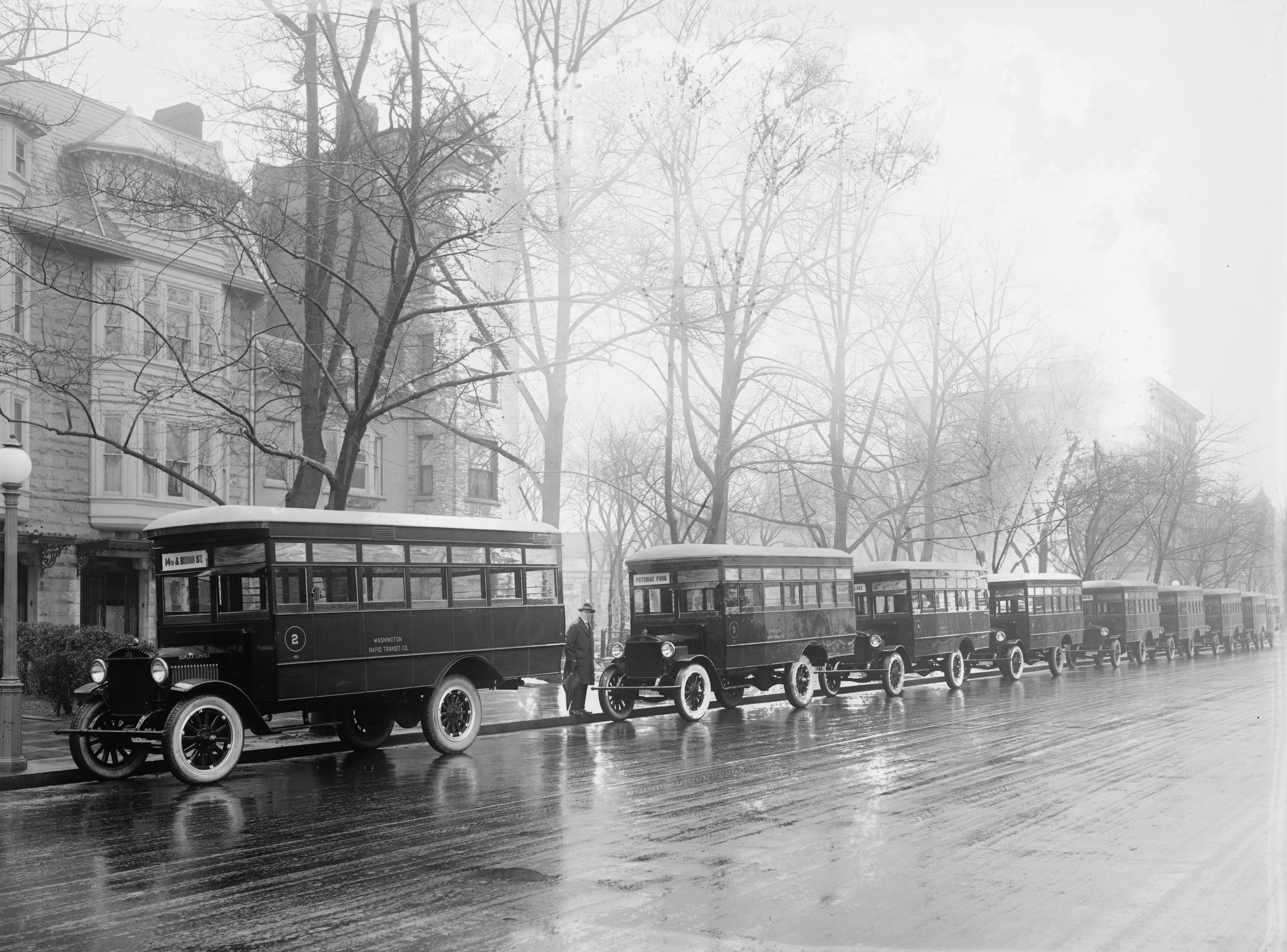
Washington Rapid Transit Company buses, ca. 1921

The first bus services in the Washington, D.C. were introduced in the early 20th century, when in 1909, the Metropolitan Coach Company began operation with gasoline-powered coaches. The company ceased operations in 1915. The next bus company in the nation's capital, the Washington Rapid Transit Company, was incorporated in 1921. By 1932, the Washington Rapid Transit Company was carrying 4.5% of transit customers in the District. In the early and mid-20th century, the public transit operators in the District consolidated themselves into the privately owned Capital Transit Company, owned by the North American Company, a utilities conglomerate. Antitrust laws required the North American Company to divest its transit operations, and in 1949, financier Louis Wolfson and his associates bought a controlling stake in Capital Transit.

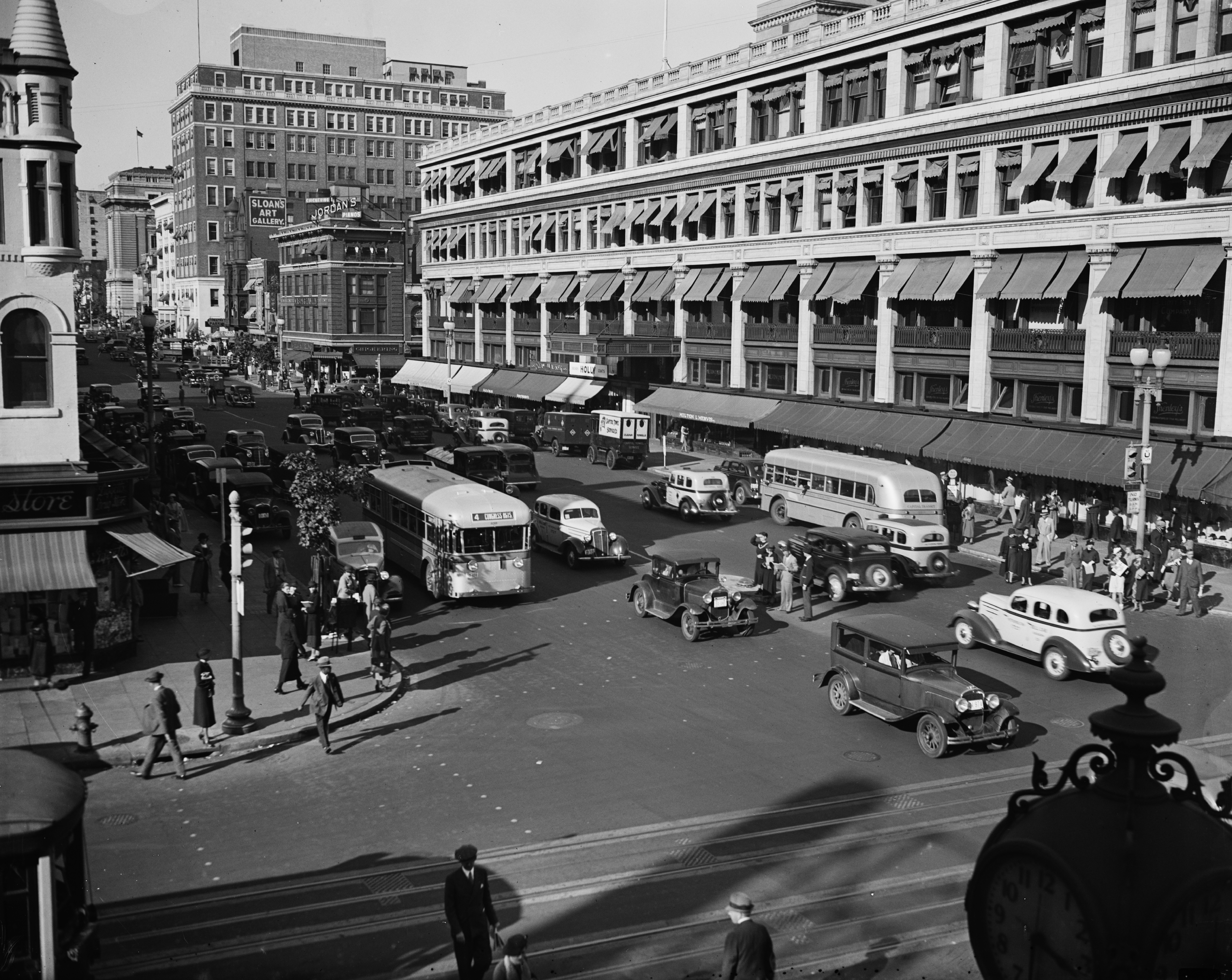
Capital Transit buses, 1935

Wolfson took advantage of Capital Transit's strong financial reserves, a business strategy that eventually led to his reputation as "the original corporate raider." Wolfson paid himself substantial dividends from the reserves, a practice that was legal but unsustainable and unpopular. Capital Transit's staff began a weeks-long strike over pay and working conditions on July 1, 1955, and Congress eventually resolved the dispute by revoking Wolfson's franchise to operate the system. Congress imposed conditions on Capital Transit's successor D.C. Transit, managed by airline entrepreneur O. Roy Chalk, which required all streetcar lines to be converted to buses by 1963.

=== Founding ===
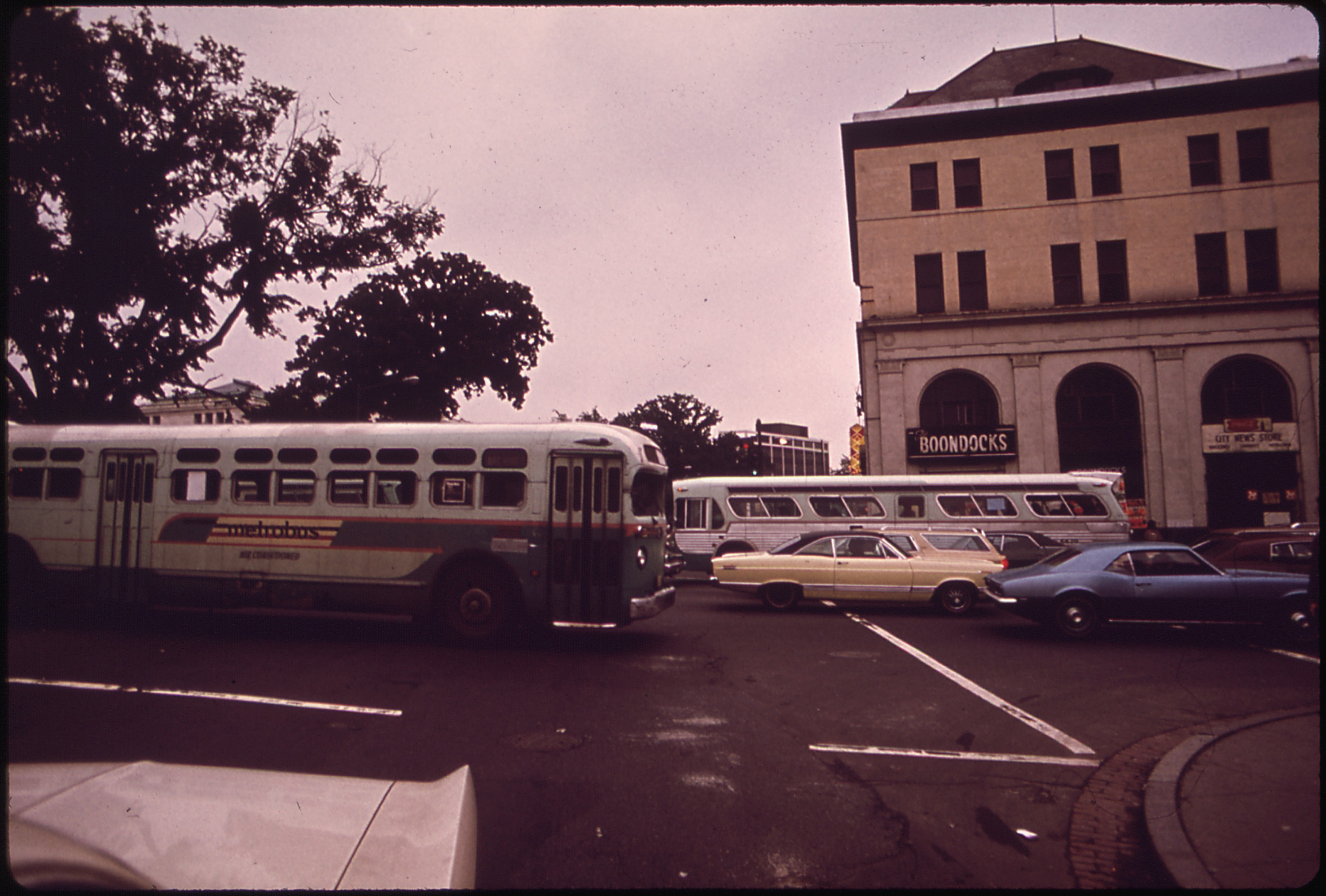
Metrobus buses in May 1973

The Washington Metropolitan Area Transit Authority was created in 1967 by an interstate compact between Maryland, Virginia, and the District of Columbia. Initially, WMATA was created solely to plan and construct a rapid rail system. The compact was amended in late 1971 to allow WMATA to operate bus services. WMATA sought to buy out Chalk and take over bus services in the region, and the expiration of D.C. Transit's union contract in October 1972 created a sense of urgency. Regional leaders feared a repeat of the 1955 strike, and Chalk made major concessions to the Amalgamated Transit Union to keep services running, including regular cost-of-living increases for bus operators. Negotiations between Chalk and WMATA were unsuccessful, but WMATA had an alternative, as permitted by the text of the compact.

At 2 a.m. Eastern Time on January 14, 1973, WMATA condemned and forcibly purchased D.C. Transit and its suburban subsidiary the Washington, Virginia and Maryland Coach Company (WV&M), seizing their bus fleets and properties and paying $38.2 million (Note: Equivalent to $211 million in 2025) in compensation. The Washington Post described the purchase as "the residents of metropolitan Washington [beginning] to gain control of a multimillion dollar lemon." Three weeks after seizing D.C. Transit, WMATA reached agreements to purchase two other suburban bus companies, the WMA Transit Company and the Alexandria, Barcroft and Washington Transit Company (AB&W).

=== Early services ===
With the acquisition of D.C. Transit and the three suburban carriers, WMATA became the third-largest bus operator in the country. The Metrobus brand was introduced immediately, with Metrobus logos applied to some buses within hours of the takeover. Metrobus started with a fleet of over 1,100 buses from its predecessors. The start of Metrobus service rapidly changed WMATA, which grew from a staff of 300 to over 4,000 on little notice. With the rapid expansion of the agency, conflicts arose between the planning and funding for the under-construction Metrorail system and the existing Metrobus system.

In addition to its funding problems, Metrobus suffered from communications problems. D.C. Transit had not published a full route map in four years, and WMATA took until early 1974 to develop its own map. The map was released as an abridged one-sheet version, accompanied by a 72-page atlas. The atlas consisted solely of maps with no timetables, which were printed separately. The system was unusually complex compared to its peers in other large American cities, with over 1,100 route variations. In April 1974, Metrobus operated a fleet of over 2,000 buses, employing 3,200 drivers.

When it took control of the region's bus system, WMATA began instituting a uniform fare structure, including a discounted fare for senior citizens. With backlash continuing from passengers angry about a trend of D.C. Transit fare hikes, the WMATA board agreed to freeze bus fares at the 1970 level. This caused Metrobus to drop to 50% farebox recovery by late 1974. WMATA had planned to subsidize Metrobus service for an introductory period, but it was rapidly confronted by the need to continue subsidizing operations. WMATA received subsidies from the federal government and the local governments in its service area to continue operations, but the finances of the system remained in question until a 1980 act of Congress provided for partially dedicated funding from Virginia, Maryland, and Washington, D.C. The issues of funding were not fully resolved, and continue into the 21st century.

=== Late 1970s: Metrorail opening and labor conflicts ===
Construction on Metrorail proceeded at great expense, with the first segment of the Red Line from Rhode Island Avenue to Farragut North opening in March 1976. The events of the United States Bicentennial were a key point for Metrobus, which operated special services for the bicentennial fireworks show on the National Mall on Sunday, July 4th, 1976. Metrorail was not yet operating on weekends, and Metrobus routes operated on a regular Sunday schedule, with some special shuttle services to suburban parking lots. Ridership was far higher than expected, and severe traffic congestion delayed the buses. After the fireworks, crowds of thousands of people were left waiting for hours even as traffic congestion subsided. Political controversy followed, exposing the still-fragile nature of the Metrobus system.

Metrobus drivers struck multiple times in the 1970s, including two wildcat strikes in 1978, seeking better working conditions and pay that continued to keep up with rapid inflation. In May 1978, drivers struck for one day in response to an incident where a driver dragged off her bus and assaulted in Fort Dupont Park. The May strike resulted in WMATA expediting the installation of a silent alarm system on buses and increasing police patrols. In July, drivers struck for 7 days over pay and benefits, protesting a delayed cost-of-living increase from years earlier.

=== 1980s and 1990s: Accessibility ===
Metrobus purchased its first wheelchair lift-equipped buses in 1978, with lifts installed in 151 Flxible New Look buses. The accessible buses complemented the Metrorail system, which was built to be fully accessible to people with disabilities. Accessible buses were in an early stage of development, and the wheelchair lifts installed in WMATA's initial fleet of buses were unreliable. The initial pilot of wheelchair-accessible buses ran from 1979 to 1981, with the lift-equipped buses operating hourly on trunk routes across the system. The lifts required frequent maintenance due to faulty sensors and operator error, and the buses themselves experienced serious transmission problems.

Controversy over lift-equipped buses continued for years, as WMATA continued purchasing a portion of its new bus fleet with wheelchair lifts. Following the initial pilot, WMATA instituted an "On-Call" program for accessible buses in 1982. The On-Call program provided accessible service by assigning lift-equipped buses to specific trips by request, with requests taken one day in advance. In 1985, approximately 14% of the Metrobus fleet was equipped with wheelchair lifts. MetroAccess paratransit service began in 1994, offering additional options for Metrobus and Metrorail customers with disabilities.

=== 1990s: Regional network and fragmentation ===
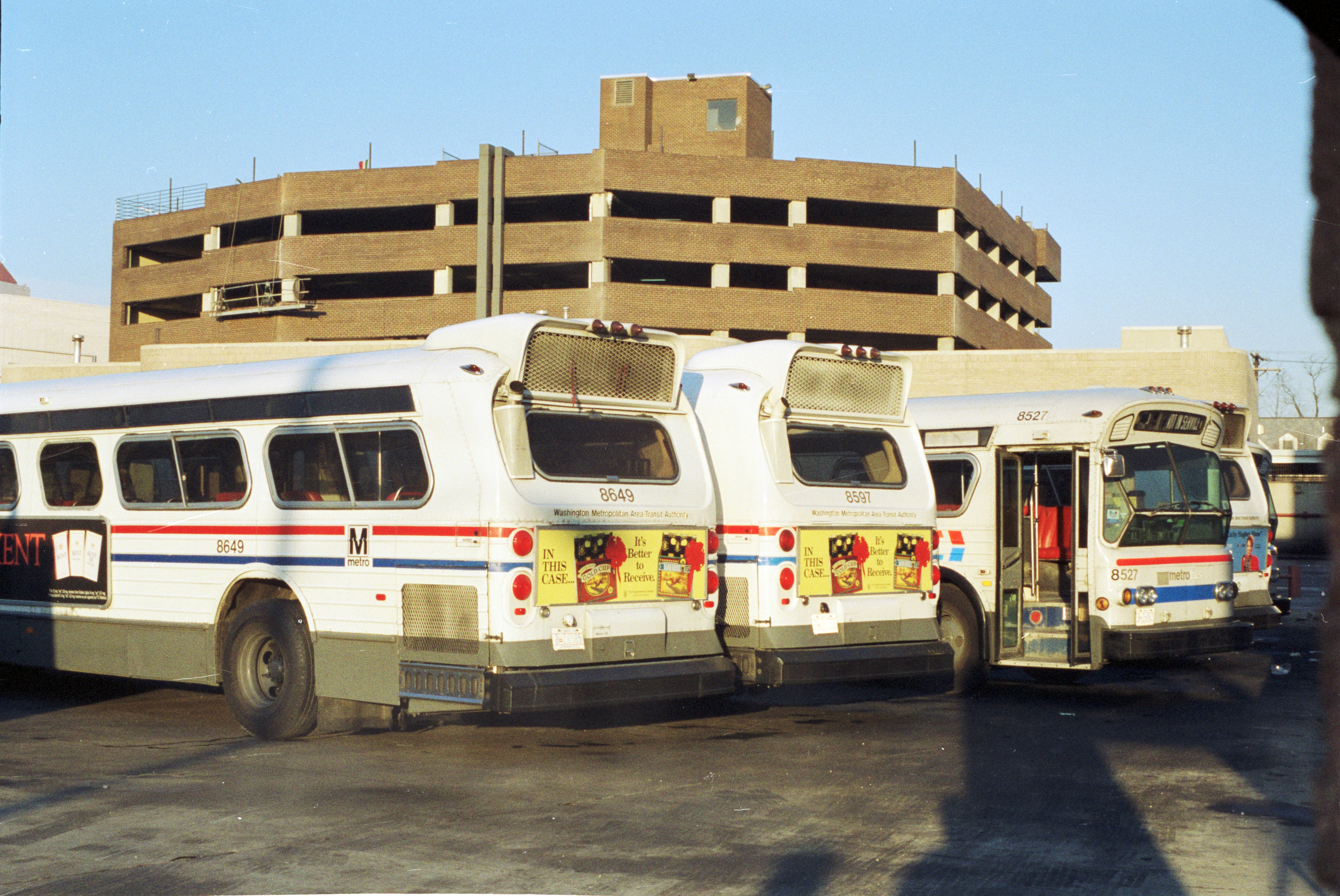
Flxible New Look buses at the Montgomery division, 1990

The regional bus network in Maryland and Virginia became more complex in the 1980s, with the introduction of locally operated bus systems sponsored by cities and counties. The first major operator was Ride-On in Montgomery County, Maryland, which began operation in 1975. By 1981, the county-operated Ride-On system was serving 20,000 passengers per day. Montgomery County achieved significant cost savings with its in-house operation, which employed non-union drivers and used buses without wheelchair lifts. In the mid-1980s, two major Virginia jurisdictions followed suit with the introduction of Fairfax Connector (Fairfax County) and DASH (Alexandria).

A major change in Metrobus funding was proposed in 1997, in response to the growth of independent bus operators. The Regional Mobility Panel, a group of local government, business, and labor leaders organized by WMATA, recommended designating Metrobus lines as either "regional" or "non-regional" for the purposes of allocating funding. Regional lines would be operated by WMATA with funding from across the region, while non-regional lines would be funded by local governments, and could be operated by WMATA, the local governments themselves, or private operators.

=== 2000s: Express service and alternative fuels ===
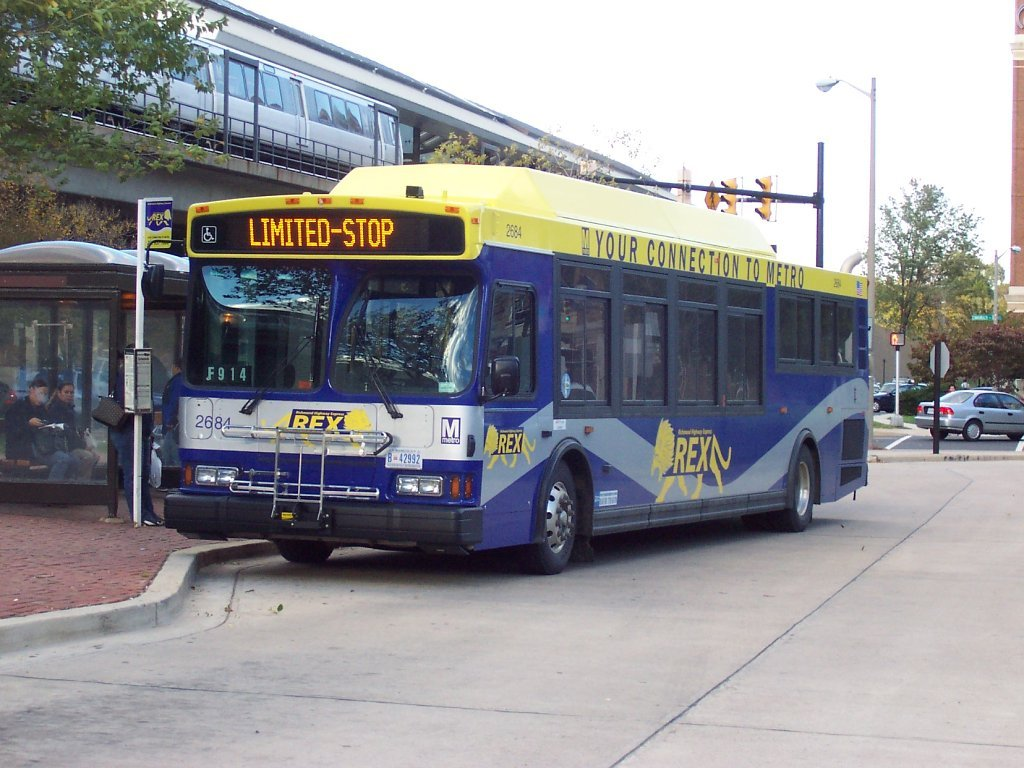
Richmond Highway Express bus at King Street station, 2006

In the early 2000s, WMATA introduced multiple brands of limited-stop and express bus services. Express service to Dulles and BWI airports on routes 5A and B30 began in 2000 and 2001 respectively. Richmond Highway Express limited-stop service began in 2004, serving the major employment center at Fort Belvoir. The MetroExtra limited-stop service brand was introduced in 2007, beginning with route 79 on Georgia Avenue.

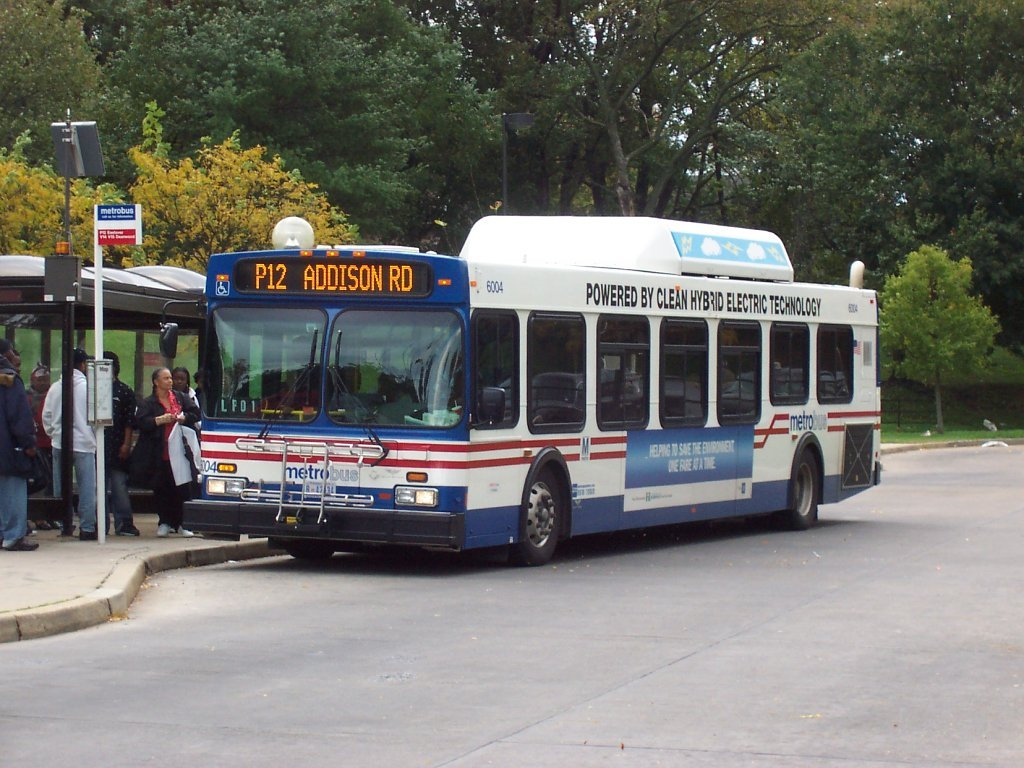
Hybrid-electric New Flyer DE40LF bus at Addison Road station, 2006

Beginning in the early 2000s, multiple Metrobus garages were equipped with compressed natural gas fueling equipment. The first CNG-powered buses were placed into service in February 2002, operating from the Bladensburg Road bus division in Northeast Washington D.C. The Four Mile Run division in Arlington, Virginia was converted to CNG in 2005, and the Metrobus fleet included over 400 CNG-powered buses by 2006. WMATA also made improvements to its diesel-powered fleet, retrofitting older diesel buses with diesel particulate filters and switching to ultra-low-sulfur diesel fuel. The first hybrid-electric buses were introduced in the early 2000s, providing significant fuel savings over older models.

The SmarTrip electronic payment system was introduced on Metrorail in the late 1990s, and piloted on Northern Virginia Metrobus routes in 2002. All Metrobus buses were equipped with SmarTrip readers by 2004, and WMATA introduced a discounted bus fare for SmarTrip users in 2008. Following the introduction of the SmarTrip card, paper bus transfers were discontinued in 2009.

=== 2010s: First electric buses and bus division relocation ===
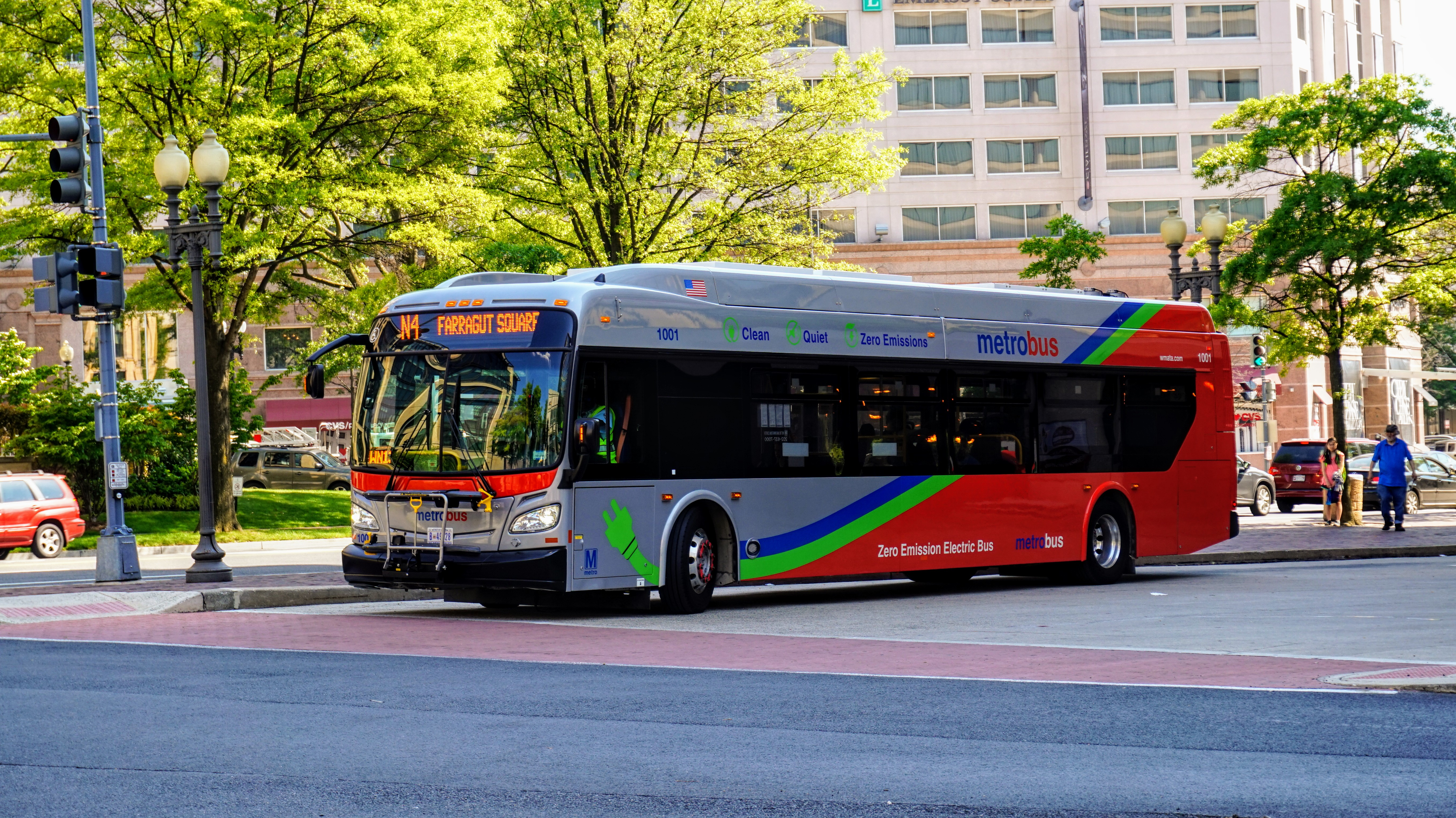
First electric bus, 2017

Metrobus introduced a single battery-electric bus in 2017, a New Flyer Xcelsior CHARGE model. Also in 2017, WMATA released a 10-year fleet management plan, which planned for Metrobus to continue purchasing exclusively CNG and diesel-powered buses until 2025. The Sierra Club criticized the plan in a 2021 paper, which argued that WMATA should purchase exclusively electric buses going forward. The Sierra Club's analysis of data from WMATA and the Argonne National Laboratory showed that electric buses would represent a significant cost savings. The paper argued that each electric bus purchased would represent a lifetime cost savings of 13% over an equivalent CNG-powered bus, with additional external benefits from reduced emissions.

WMATA's Cinder Bed Road division in Lorton, Virginia opened in 2018, replacing an undersized and outdated property in Alexandria. For the first time in the agency's history, WMATA contracted out the operations at the garage, outsourcing to Transdev. Drivers at the Cinder Bed Road division received lower pay and worse benefits than drivers employed directly by WMATA at other garages. The drivers, organized by Amalgamated Transit Union Local 689, struck in October 2019, marking the first Metrobus strike since 1978. Fairfax Connector drivers employed by Transdev struck for 3 days in early December during their contract negotiations, adding to pressure on WMATA and Transdev to improve conditions for drivers. The strike ended in January 2020, with an agreement from WMATA to not renew the contract with Transdev. WMATA took over operations at the Cinder Bed Road division in December 2021.

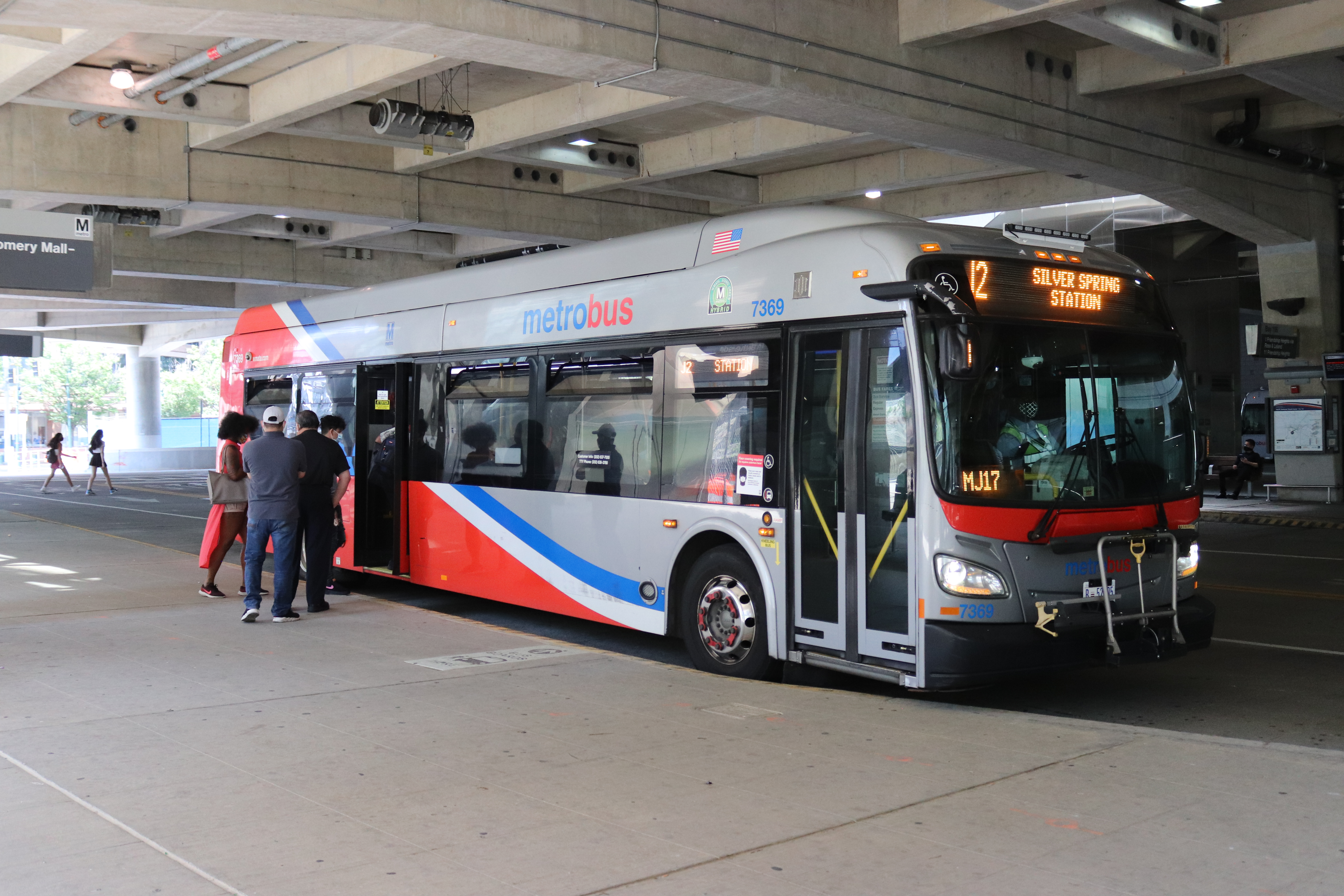
Passengers board through the rear door at Silver Spring station, August 2020

=== 2020s: COVID-19 pandemic and route network redesign ===
The COVID-19 pandemic had a major effect on public transit worldwide, including Metrobus and Metrorail. Metrobus mandated masks and required passengers to board through the back door of buses, keeping passengers separated from bus operators. Fare collection resumed in January 2021, after partitions were installed to separate drivers from passengers.

Metrobus carried approximately 180,000 passengers per day in early 2021, down from 300,000 per day before the COVID-19 pandemic. Metrobus services carried approximately twice as many passengers as the Metrorail system in that period, demonstrating the continued value of Metrobus as a regional service. During the COVID-19 pandemic, Metrobus and Metrorail ridership exhibited a dramatic shift away from traditional peak commute hours, with weekend and evening ridership remaining relatively high. By April 2021, WMATA had increased service on some Metrobus routes to above pre-pandemic levels to reduce crowding and promote social distancing.

Following 5 years of planning, WMATA proposed a comprehensive redesign of the Metrobus network in 2023, the agency's first full bus network redesign. As part of the Better Bus Redesign Network project, WMATA planners proposed a new system of route numbers. The Better Bus Redesign Network was formally approved by the WMATA board of directors in November 2024 and implemented on June 29, 2025. The redesign reduced the number of routes from 225 to 125 and eliminated 527 of 6,500 bus stops.

In May 2026, WMATA proposed a new Bus Rapid Transit line called the Gold Line to be implemented upon the opening of the new RFK stadium in Northeast D.C. The new gold line will have dedicated lanes along H Street NW and Benning Road NE to connect the stadium to Washington Union Station with future phases extended to both Rosslyn station and Benning Road station/Minnesota Avenue station.

== Fares ==
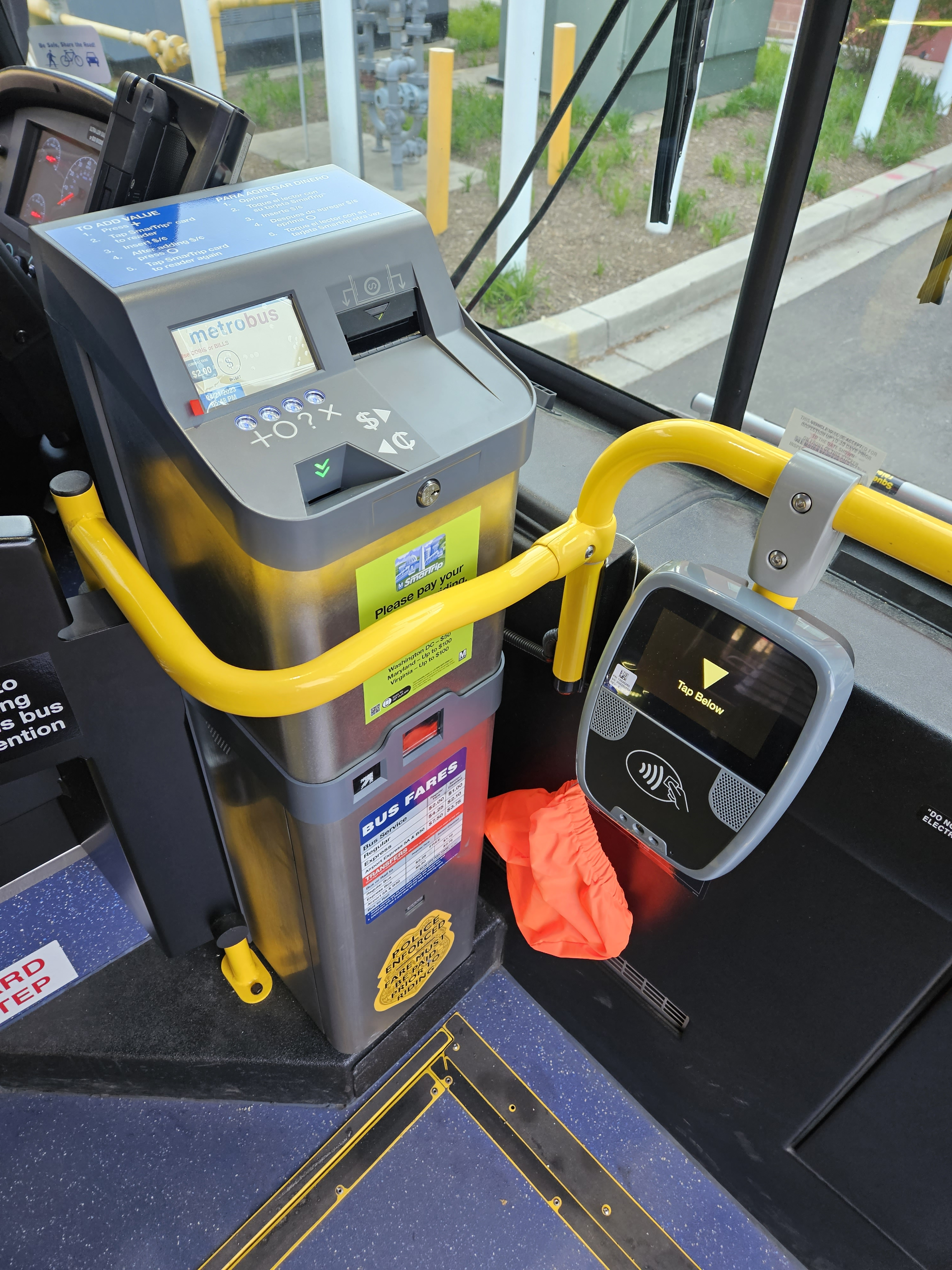
Metrobus farebox and SmarTrip reader.

As of November 18, 2025, the standard Metrobus fare is $2.25. Fares can be paid with a SmarTrip card, cash, or a contactless credit or debit card. Express bus routes F19, F28, F81, and F83 charge a fare of $4.80.

Discounts are available for senior citizens, people with disabilities and D.C. students. Up to two children, per paying adult, under 5 years of age ride for free. Children at least 5 years of age pay adult fare.

All fares were free from mid-March 2020 to January 3, 2021, due to the COVID-19 pandemic. On December 6, 2022, the Council of the District of Columbia voted to abolish fares within city limits from July 1, 2023. The District has continued to delay its fare-free service due to its inability to fund the program and opposition from D.C. Mayor Muriel Bowser, Maryland, and Virginia.

Metrobuses will begin enforcement of tapping discounted fare cards starting on February 1, 2026.

== Fleet ==
On February 6, 2025, New Flyer announced a significant contract with WMATA for up to 500 buses. The order includes diesel-electric hybrid and battery electric transit buses.

In 2020, WMATA received $4.1 million in funding from the Federal Transit Administration for the purchase of electric buses and charging infrastructure. A Sierra Club report indicated that a pilot study with 14 electric buses was planned, and estimated that 50% electrification would reduce the WMATA fleet's greenhouse gas (GHG) emissions by more than 58,000 tons of carbon dioxide (CO_{2}) per year.

WMATA has a plan to move to a fully electric bus fleet by 2045.

== Divisions ==
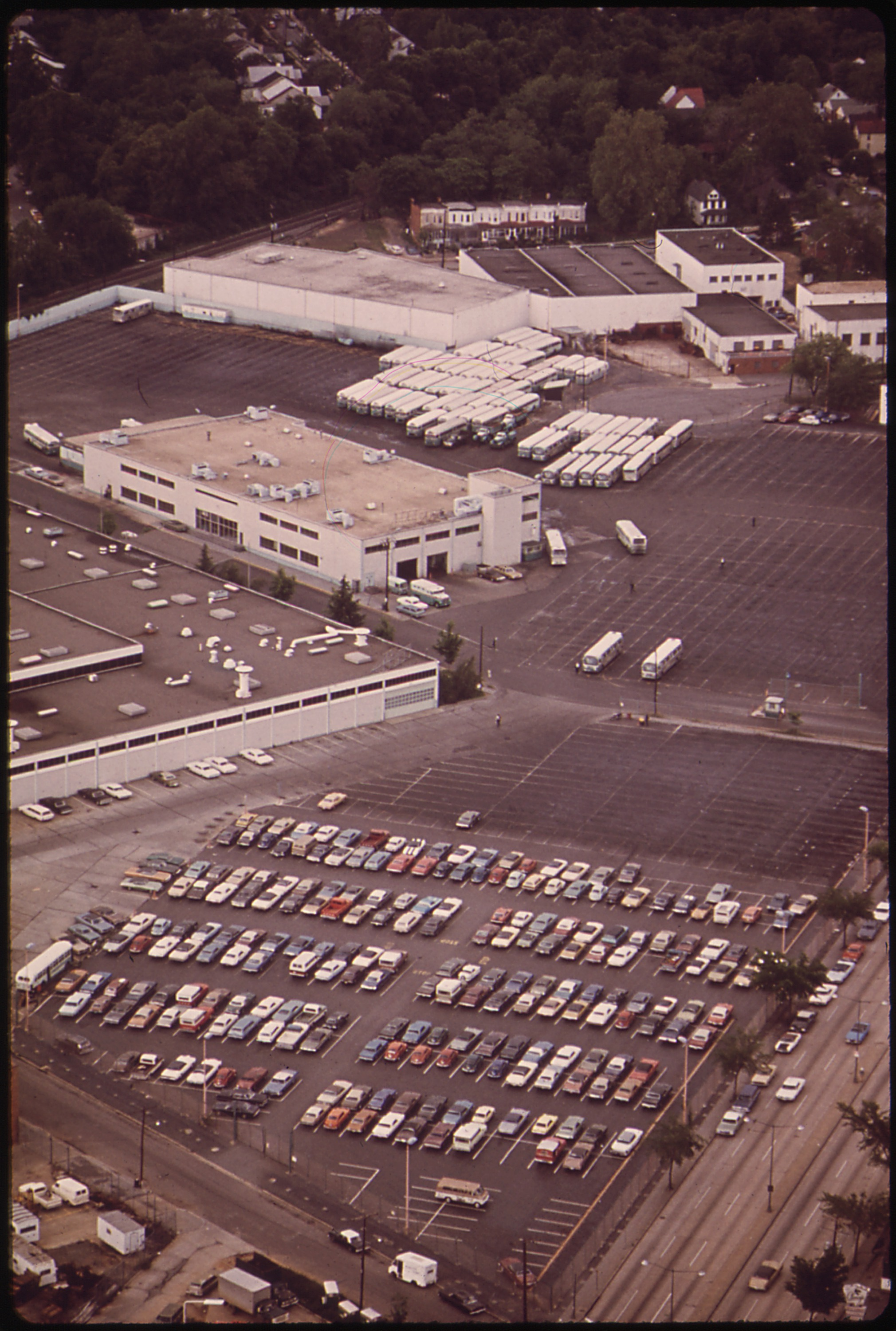
Aerial view of Bladensburg Road division, 1973

WMATA refers to its bus garages as "divisions." As of 2025, Metrobus buses are stored and maintained at 8 active divisions, located across the metropolitan area.

=== Active divisions ===
Division	Location	Areas served	Capacity	Notes
Andrews Federal Center	Forestville, MD	Southwest DC, Prince George's County	175	Opened on June 23, 2019
Bladensburg	Northeast DC	Northeast and Southeast DC	257	Currently rebuilding
Cinder Bed Road	Franconia, VA	Fairfax County	160	Opened in 2018, operated by the private contractor Transdev until 2021.
Four Mile Run	Arlington County, VA	Arlington County, Fairfax County, City of Alexandria	218	
Landover	Landover, MD	Prince George's County	210	
Montgomery	North Bethesda, MD	Montgomery County	240	
Shepherd Parkway	Southwest DC	Southeast and Southwest DC, Prince George's County	250	Opened in 2012, was converted into a CNG garage. Currently undergoing modifications to hold electric buses.
Western	Northwest DC	Northwest DC	138	

=== Under construction ===
Division	Location	Areas served	Capacity	Notes
Northern	Northwest DC	Northwest DC	150	Former trolley barn for the Capital Traction Company. Closed on June 23, 2019 due to structural issues, to reopen in 2027 serving electric buses only

=== Closed divisions ===
Division	Location	Areas served	Capacity	Notes
Arlington	Arlington County, VA	Arlington County, Fairfax County		Closed in 2009, replaced by West Ox Division
Southeastern	Southeast DC	Southeast and Southwest DC		Closed in 2008; operations moved to Southern Avenue until the Shepherd Parkway Division opened in 2012
Southern Avenue Annex	Coral Hills, MD	Southeast DC, Prince George's County	103	Formerly known as Prince George's Division until 1989, closed in 2024
Royal Street	Alexandria, VA	Fairfax County, City of Alexandria	83	Closed in 2014, replaced by the Cinder Bed Division. Demolished in January 2020.
West Ox	Fair Lakes, VA	Arlington County, Fairfax County	100	Operated Weekdays only, shared with Fairfax Connector. Temporarily closed on March 14, 2021; All operations were moved to Four Mile Run Division.

== Routes ==
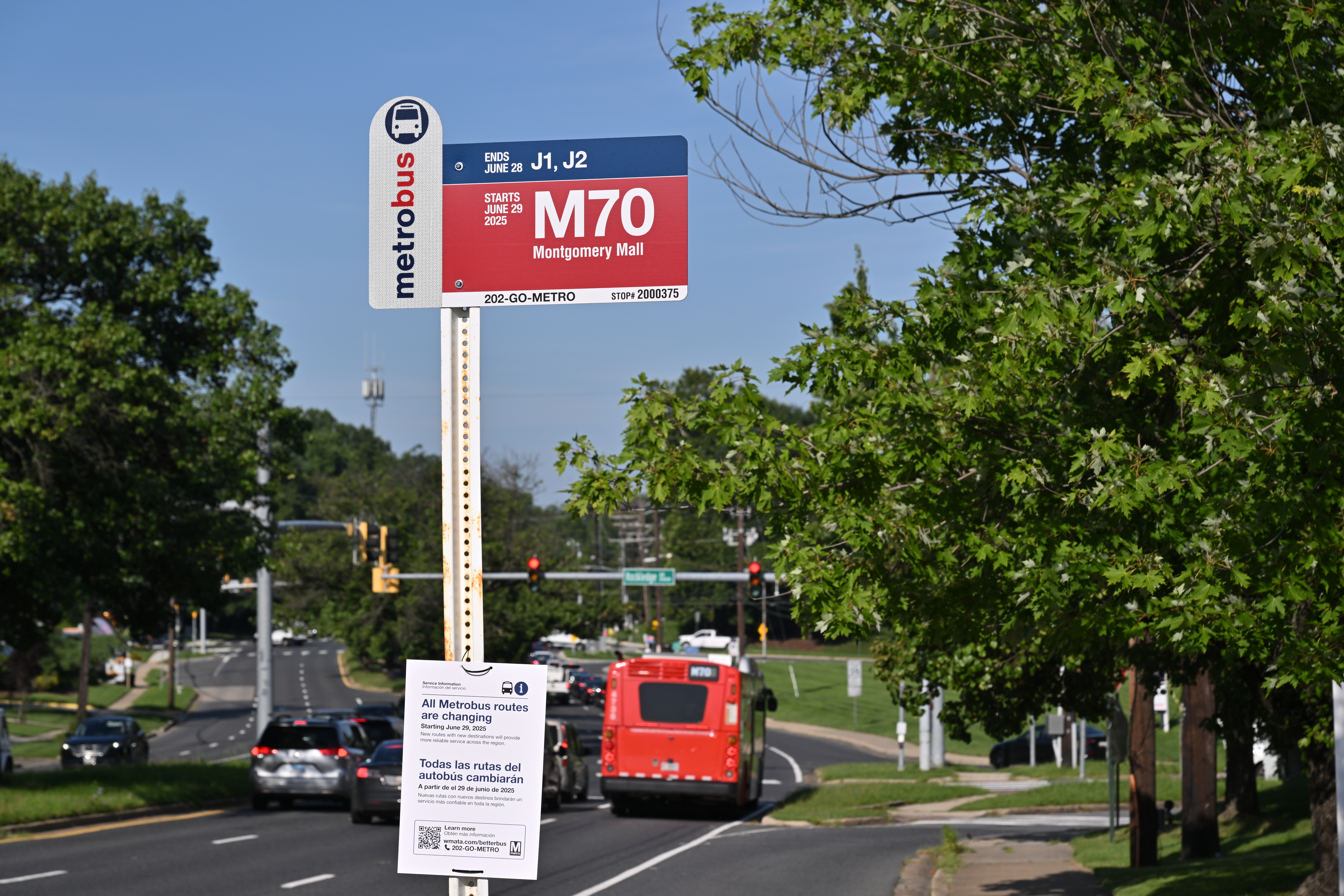
Metrobus stop in Bethesda, Maryland with revised route numbers

With the introduction of the Better Bus Redesign Network on June 29, 2025, the following system of route numbering was instituted. Route numbers consist of a region prefix and a route number.

- Routes in Washington, D.C. that serve Downtown have the region prefix "D"
- Routes in Washington, D.C. that do not serve Downtown have the region prefix "C"
- Routes in Arlington County and Alexandria, VA have the region prefix "A"
- Routes in Falls Church, City of Fairfax, and Fairfax County, VA have the region prefix "F"
- Routes in Montgomery County, MD have the region prefix "M"
- Routes in Prince George's County, MD have the region prefix "P"
- Limited-stop services have the suffix "X"

=== History of route numbers ===
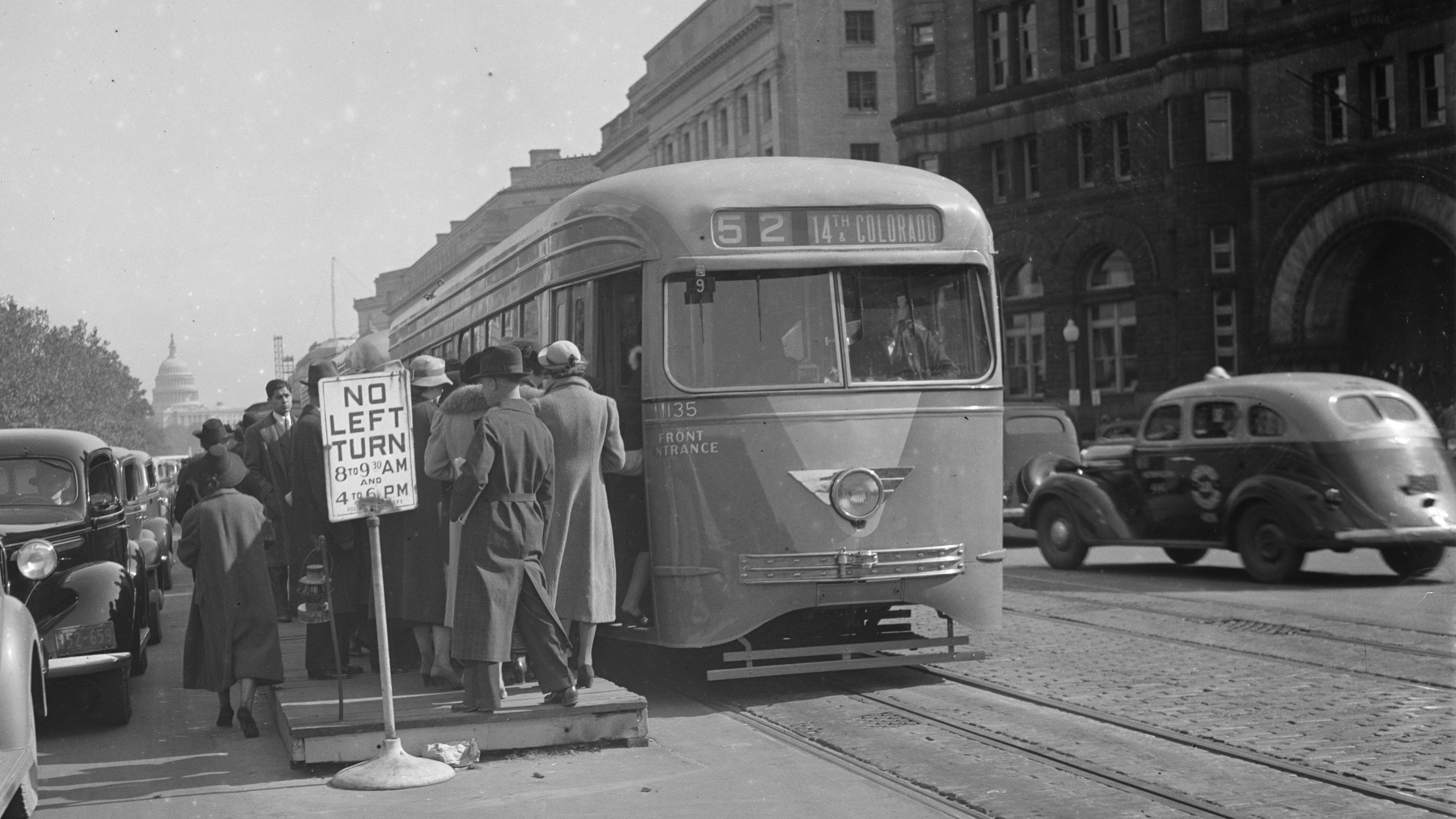
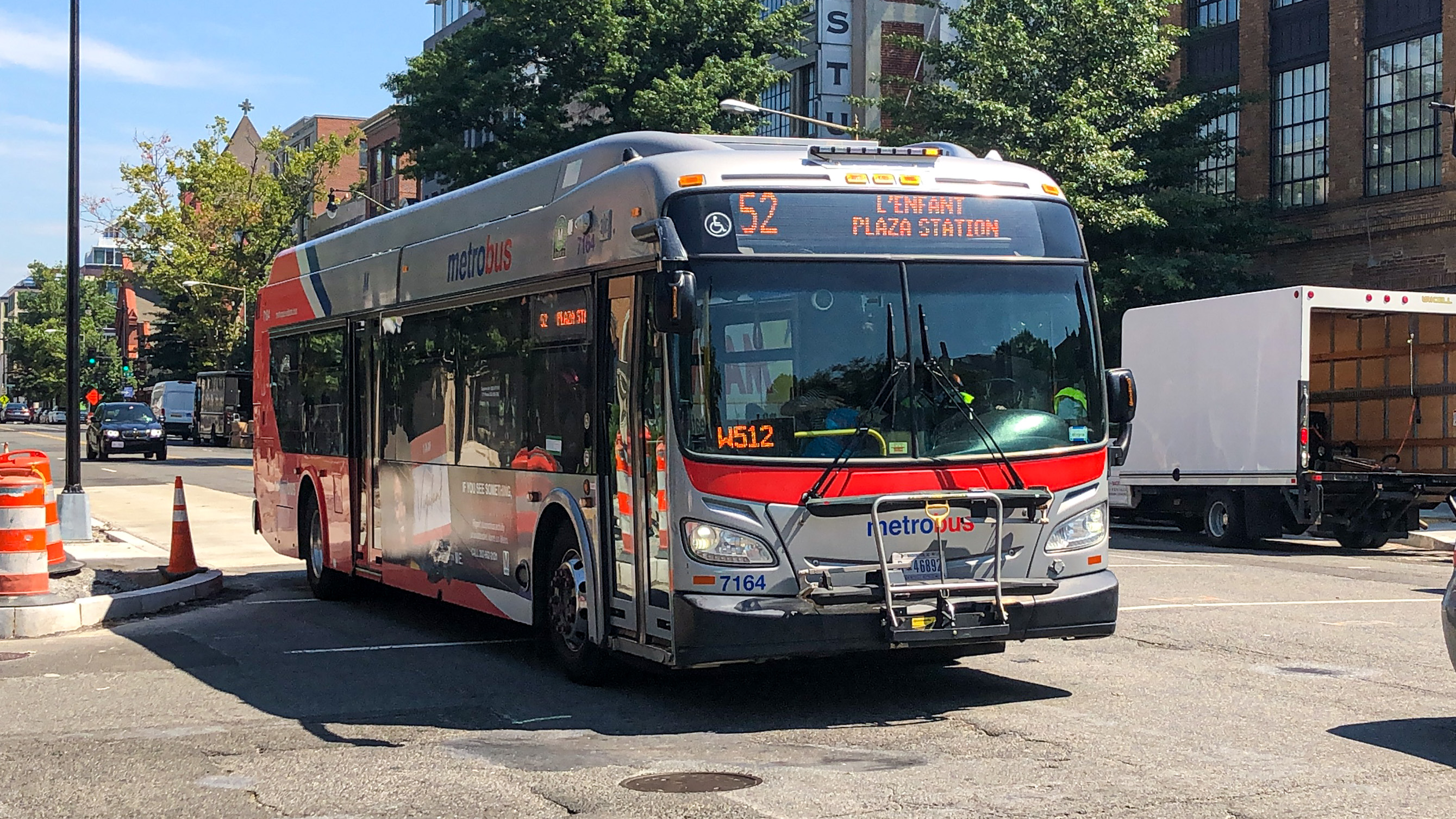
Some Metrobus route numbers were unchanged from the 1930s to 2025. The pictured Capital Transit PCC streetcar and the Metrobus are both on Route 52, over 80 years apart.

The following system of route numbering was in use from the founding of Metrobus in 1973 until the Better Bus Network's launch in June 2025. Some route numbers are descendants of lines that began operating in the early 20th century.

- Routes in Washington, D.C. had either a two digit number (31, 42, 64) or a letter followed by a number (A2, S2, X8)
- Routes in Montgomery County, MD had a letter followed by a number (C4, Q4, Z6)
- Routes in Prince George's County, MD had a letter followed by two numbers (F12, J12, P12)
- Routes in Northern Virginia had one or two numbers followed by a letter (1A, 16C, 29N)
- Odd-numbered routes were generally peak-only service, and even-numbered routes were generally all-day service
- Routes ending in 9 were MetroExtra limited-stop services (59, 79)

The former system of Metrobus route numbers traces its history to 1936, when the Capital Transit Company created route numbers for its network of streetcar and bus services. Streetcars were assigned two-number route numbers, and buses were assigned a letter and a number. In both cases, the first digit indicated the trunk line, and the second digit indicated the specific service. All streetcar lines were converted to buses in the 1960s, but the route numbers were retained.

Metrobus began service in 1973, combining the networks of four urban and suburban bus companies. WMATA kept most of its predecessors' route numbers, with minor changes to avoid conflicts. From the 1970s onward, WMATA planners attempted to follow the original numbering scheme when adding or changing routes. Transportation policy blog Greater Greater Washington criticized the numbering system in 2018, summarizing it as "The bus number depends on who operated it in 1973 and if it was a streetcar in 1936."

The former system of route numbers was replaced under the Better Bus Redesign Network, which was implemented on June 29, 2025. Route names in the Better Bus Redesign Network are made up of a region prefix and a route number, with a suffix for limited-stop services.

== Special services ==
=== Limited-stop service ===
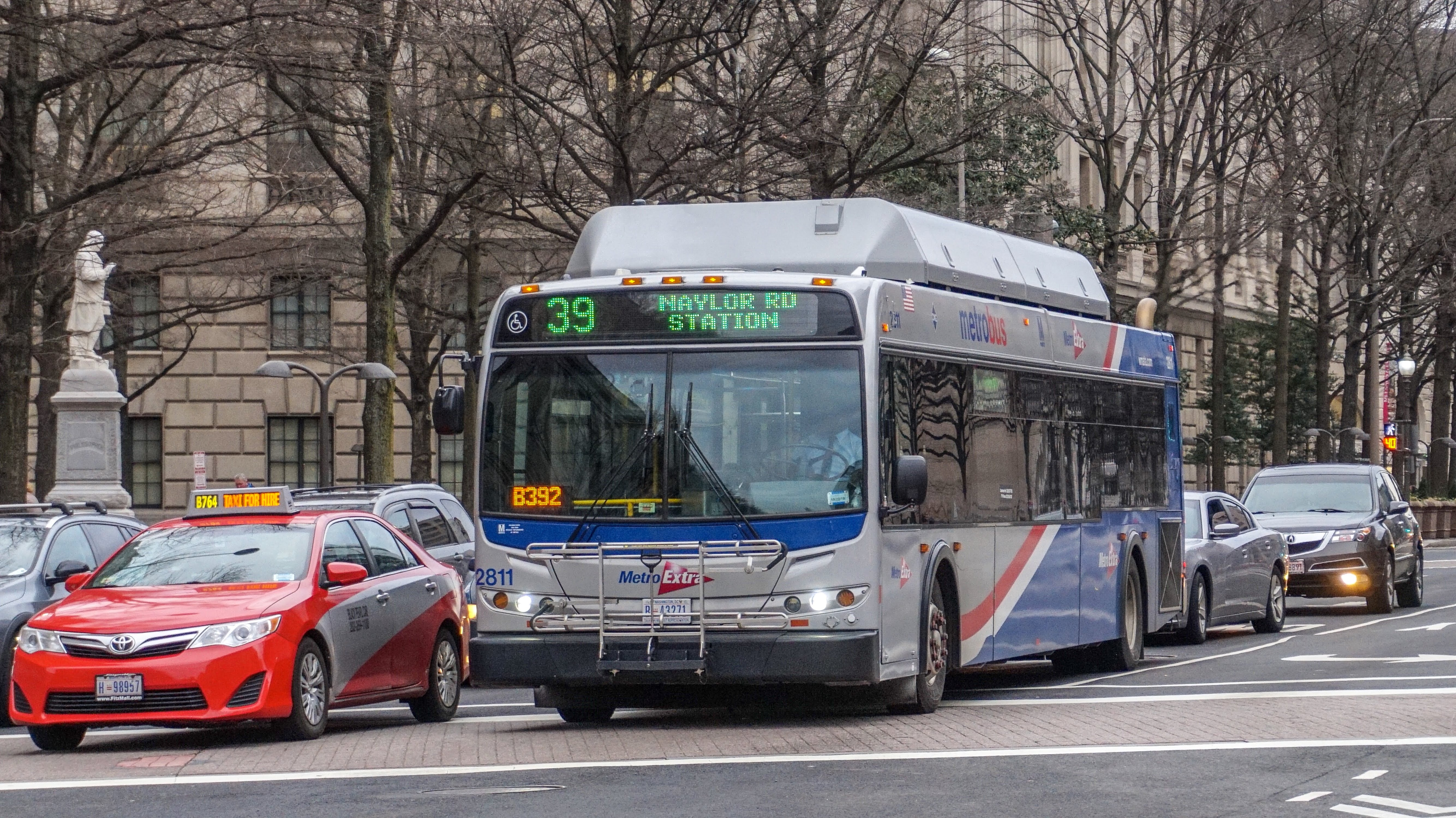
MetroExtra route 39 bus in 2018

Metrobus operates 9 limited-stop routes, providing faster service on select corridors. The MetroExtra brand for limited-stop Metrobus service began in 2007 on the Georgia Avenue–7th Street Line. Before the introduction of the MetroExtra brand, some limited-stop services were operated under the Metro Express brand, which was merged into the MetroExtra service in 2012. The MetroExtra branding was discontinued on June 29, 2025 following the implementation of WMATA's Better Bus Network with these routes now being denoted as "Express" routes.

=== Metroway ===

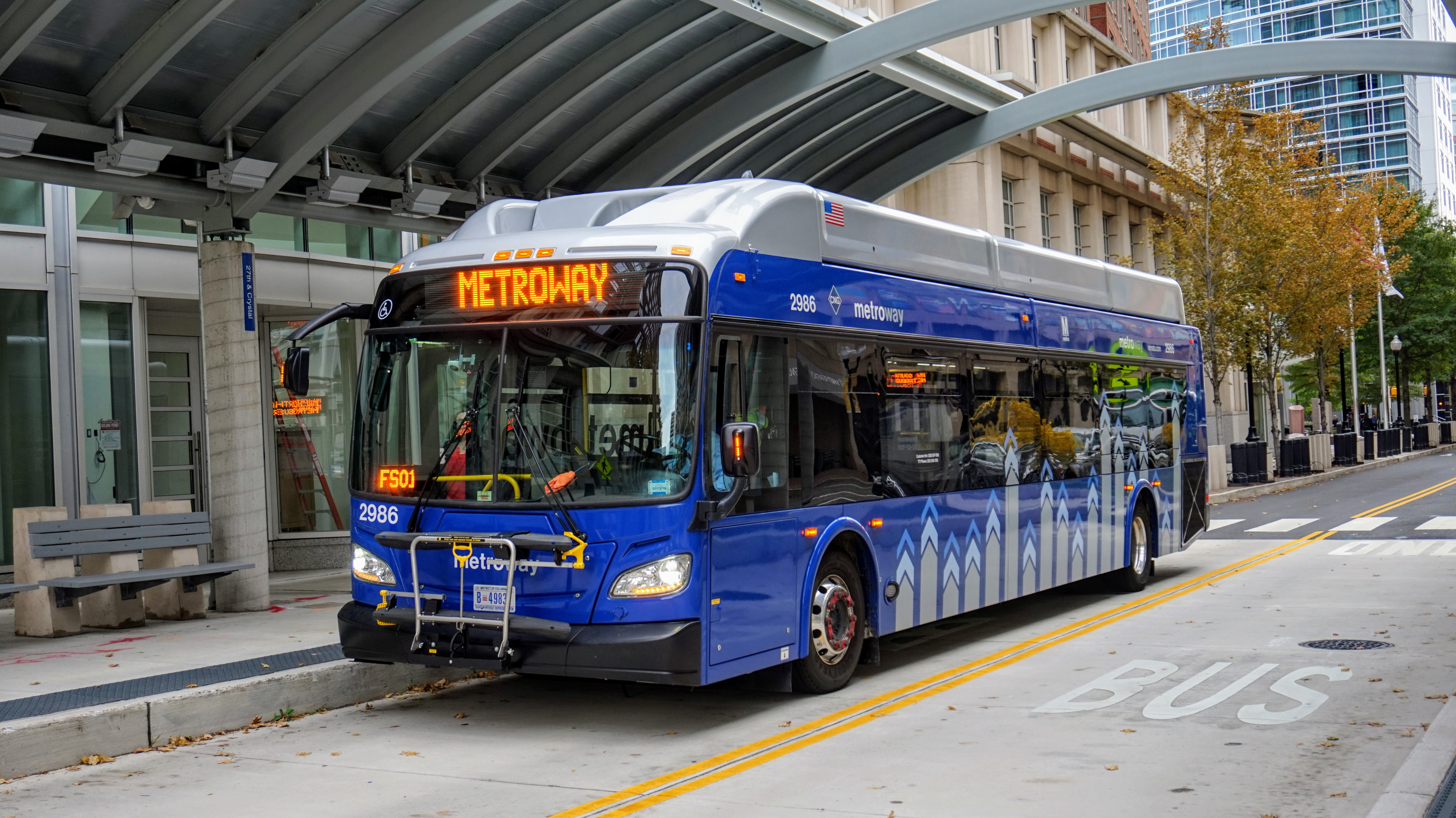
Metroway bus at 27th & Crystal station in Crystal City

Metroway is a bus rapid transit (BRT) service in Arlington and Alexandria, serving Potomac Yard. The first phase is the Crystal City/Potomac Yard Transitway, which operates on Route 1 in Arlington and Alexandria, Virginia. It is a 5-mile (8.0 km) corridor with 33 platforms and 20 stations located between Pentagon City and Braddock Road. The first 0.8 mile segment in Alexandria runs on a transit lane only. The Arlington County segment began construction in the summer of 2014 and opened April 17, 2016. Metroway originally operated between the Braddock Road and Crystal City stations and was expanded to Pentagon City in April 2016. The line was renamed to A1X on June 29, 2025.

=== Richmond Highway Express ===
The Richmond Highway Express (REX) is a limited-stop service along Richmond Highway in Fairfax County, Virginia. REX service operates between Fort Belvoir and King Street–Old Town, serving multiple destinations within Fort Belvoir, including Alexander T. Augusta Military Medical Center. Service began in 2004, with distinctively branded buses and stops featuring a blue-and-gold color scheme. As part of the Better Bus Network Redesign, the line was renamed to F1X on June 29, 2025.

== See also ==
- List of Metrobus routes (Washington, D.C.)
- Metrobus fleet (Washington, D.C.)
- Metro Transit Police Department
