= Washington Rapid Transit Company =

Transport company that operated from 1921 to 1933 in Washington D.C.

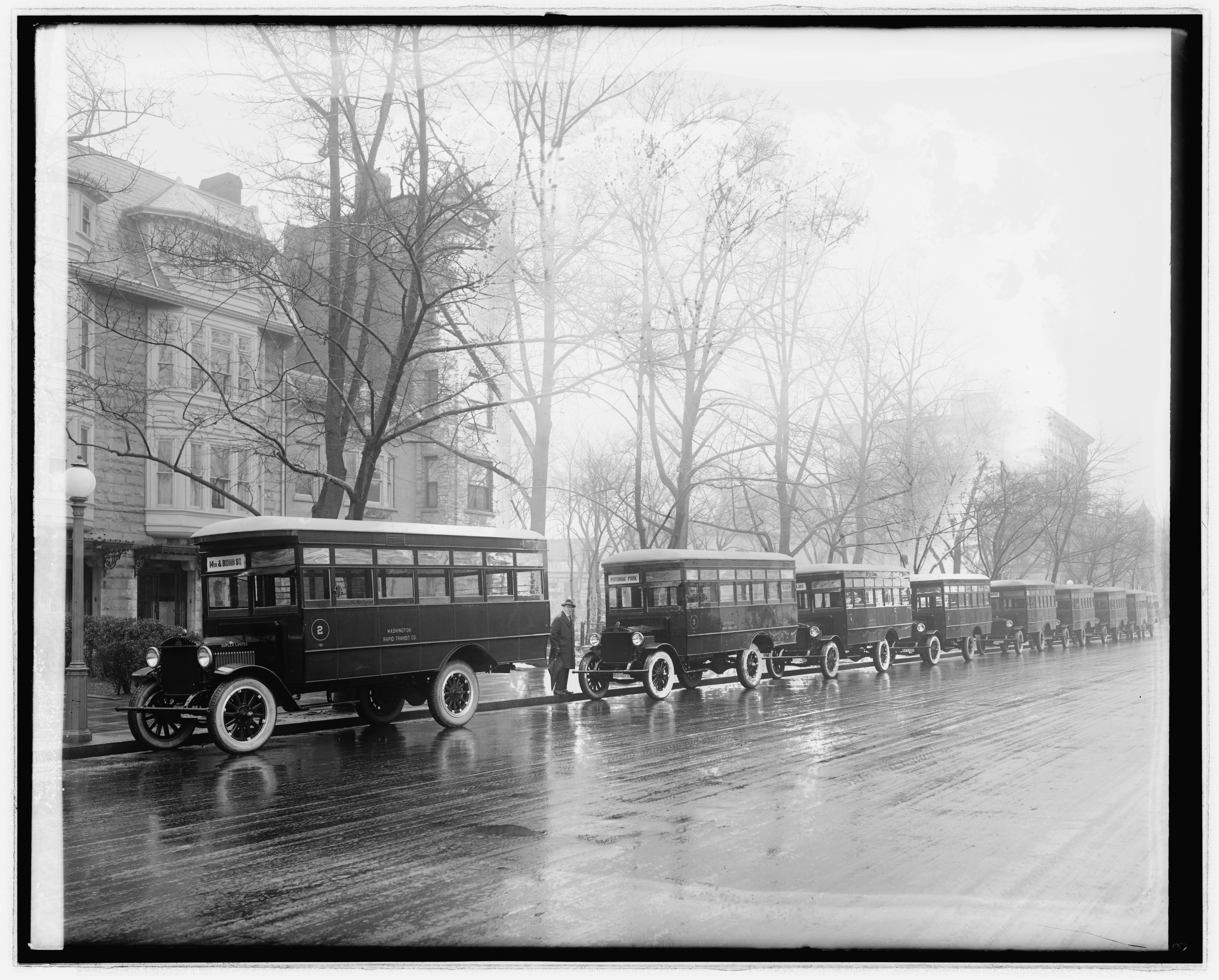
- Washington Rapid Transit Co. buses, circa 1921
- Founded: 1921
- Defunct: 1933
- Locale: Washington, D.C.

The Washington Rapid Transit Company was a bus company that operated in Washington, D.C., from 1921 to 1933.

The first formal bus company in the nation's capital, Washington Rapid Transit was incorporated on January 20, 1921. It began running bus service on March 1, 1921, with ten 21-passenger buses and on two routes covering about 5 1/2 miles of street.

By 1932, it was carrying 4.5% of transit customers. Two years later, the last streetcar line was built in D.C.

In 1926, it leased space in the Capital Traction Company's car barn at 4615 14th Street NW.

On December 1, 1933, Washington Rapid Transit was merged with the Washington Railway and Electric Company and Capital Traction to form the Capital Transit Company.
