= Randy Clarke =

CEO of Washington Metropolitan Area Transit Authority

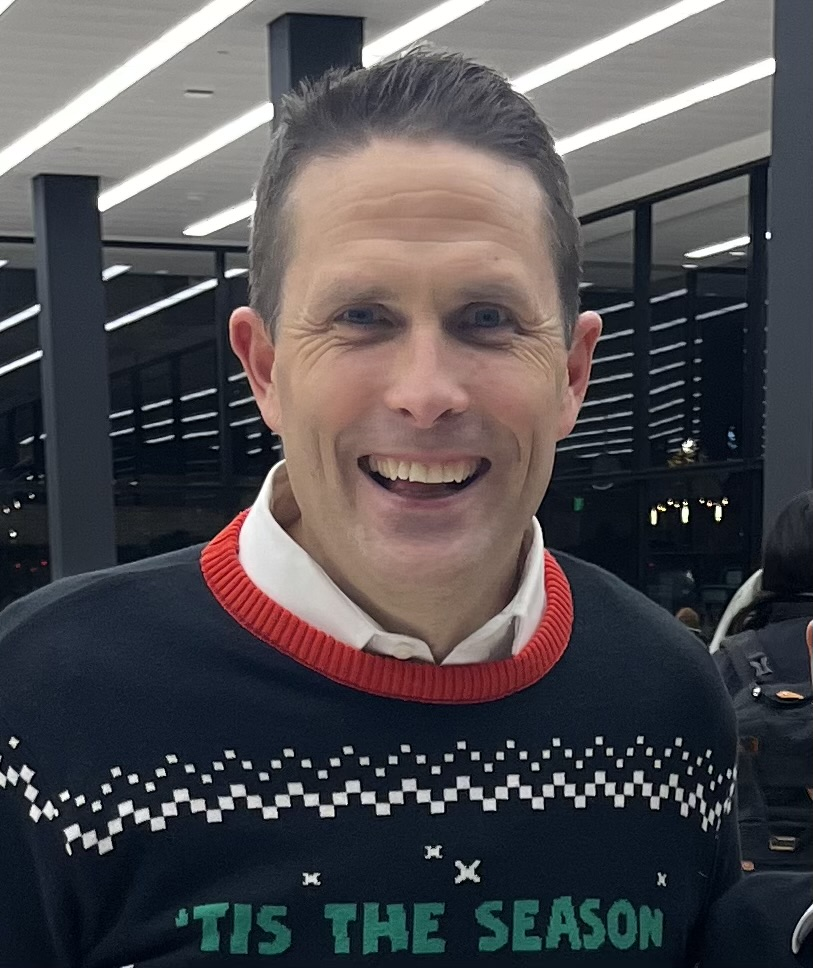
- Clarke in December 2024

General Manager and CEO of Washington Metropolitan Area Transit Authority
- Incumbent
- Assumed office July 25, 2022
- Preceded by: Andy Off

Personal details
- Born: 1977 (age 48–49)
- Education: Acadia University (BA); University of Southern Maine (MPP)

Randy Clarke (born 1977) is a Canadian-American transit executive who has served as the general manager and CEO of Washington Metropolitan Area Transit Authority (WMATA) since 2022. He also serves as the legacy system representative on the American Public Transportation Association's executive committee.

== Early life and education ==
Clarke grew up in Pictou, Nova Scotia. He holds a bachelor's degree in political science and history from Acadia University and a master's degree in public policy, planning and management from the University of Southern Maine in 1999.

== Career ==
Clarke joined the Massachusetts Bay Transportation Authority (MBTA) in 2009, serving as director of security initiatives, acting chief safety officer, and later deputy chief operating officer.

After leaving MBTA, Clarke became the vice president of operations of the American Public Transportation Association. Clarke served as president and CEO of the Capital Metropolitan Transportation Authority in Austin, Texas, from 2018 until 2022. Clarke was considered "very critical" in getting a transit ballot measure (Project Connect) passed in 2020.

In May 2022, Clarke was selected as the next general manager and CEO of Washington Metropolitan Area Transit Authority (WMATA) in Washington, D.C., succeeding former general manager Paul J. Wiedefeld. Clarke has been praised in the media and by local politicians for improving the Washington Metro and Metrobus during his tenure, with increased ridership, reliability and fall in crime levels. In 2024, a Washington Post poll of riders gave the system the highest approval ratings for over a decade. In April 2025, Clarke's contract was extended until 2029.

== Personal life ==
Clarke is married to Kimberley Sweeney, whom he met on the MBTA Red Line in Davis Square on the way to a Red Sox game.
