= Capital Traction Company Car Barn =

- U.S. National Register of Historic Places
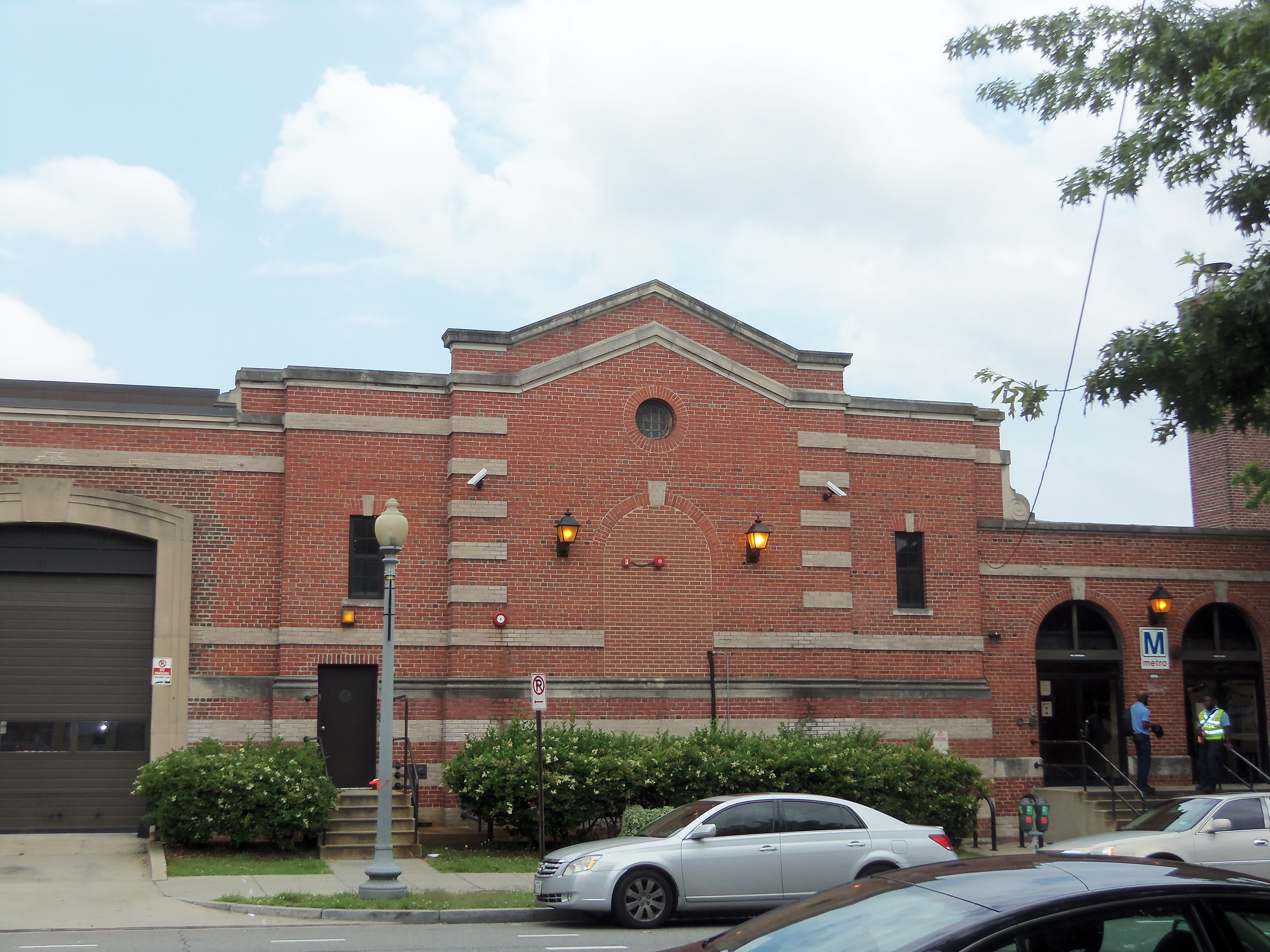

- Location within the District of Columbia Location within the United States
- Location: 4615 14th St., NW., Washington, District of Columbia
- Coordinates: 38°56′50″N 77°01′56″W
- Area: 7.3 acres (3.0 ha)
- Built: 1906
- Architect: Wood, Donn & Deming
- Architectural style: Renaissance
- NRHP reference No.: 13000290
- Added to NRHP: May 22, 2013

The Capital Traction Company Car Barn (also known as the Decatur Street Car Barn and the Northern Bus Garage) is a historic streetcar car barn in northwest Washington, D.C. Built in 1906 by the Capital Traction Company, it was later turned into a bus garage and is currently owned by Washington Metropolitan Area Transit Authority.

== Architecture ==
Located at 4615 14th Street NW, near the end of the 14th Street streetcar line, the two-story brick structure was designed by local architects Wood, Donn & Deming in Italian Renaissance style and built by contractors Richardson and Burgess. The building originally measured 537 by 208 feet (164 m × 63 m) and included two turntables.

== History ==
The car barn was built in 1906 by the Capital Traction Company. Starting in 1926, the Washington Rapid Transit Company leased part of its space for use as a bus garage. It was fully converted to a bus garage in 1959 and later became WMATA's Metrobus Northern Division garage.

In 2013, it was listed on the National Register of Historic Places.

In 2019, WMATA closed the building to replace it with a new one that will include storage and maintenance for electric buses, along with up to 27,000 square feet of retail space, streetscape improvements, and a community room. The architects are the firms of Beyer Blinder Belle and Wendel. All but the eastern (14th Street) facade of the building was demolished in 2023. Construction is slated to conclude in 2027.
