= Capital Traction Company =

US street railway company

The Capital Traction Company was the smaller of the two major street railway companies in Washington, D.C., in the early 20th century.

It was formed in 1895 when the Rock Creek Railway acquired the Washington and Georgetown Railroad Company. The company's streetcars connected the Washington, D.C., neighborhoods of Georgetown, Capitol Hill, the Armory, and Mount Pleasant; and the suburb of Chevy Chase, Maryland.

In 1933, it merged with its major competitor, the Washington Railway and Electric Company, and the Washington Rapid Transit Company, a bus operator, to form the Capital Transit Company.

== History ==
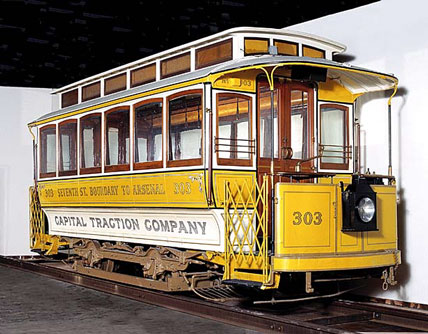
This 4-wheel, electric motor car was one of sixteen built for the Capital Traction Company by the American Car Company. Car #303 was assigned to the 7th Street line, which ran from the Wharves to Boundary. It was used as a motor car and regularly pulled a light trailer car until its retirement from regular service in 1913. This car, on display at the Museum of American History is the only Washington streetcar still in the District.

=== Origins ===
In the mid-1890s, numerous streetcar companies operated in the District. Congress tried to deal with this fractured transit system by requiring them to accept transfers and set standard pricing, and by allowing them to use one another's track. But eventually it became clear that consolidation was the best solution.

On March 1, 1895, Congress authorized the Rock Creek Railway to purchase and merge with any connecting company, and to change its name to the Capital Traction Company. The company consequently merged with the Washington and Georgetown on September 21, 1895. The merger also took advantage of a peculiar facet of the Rock Creek Railway, whose revenues were rather sparse but whose charter placed no limits on the amount of money that might be raised through the sale of stock and bonds. "This providential clause was turned to good advantage in the reorganization of the prosperous Washington and Georgetown Railroad which was severely crippled by its fixed capital ceiling of only $500,000", according to a 1966 history of D.C. streetcars.

=== Capital Traction ===
Within months of the merger, the new Capital Traction Company began building an ambitious Waddy Wood-designed car barn at 3600 M Street NW in Georgetown. Meant to be called Union Station, it was meant to serve four streetcar companies. The Metropolitan Railroad would use the roof, the old Washington and Georgetown lines would use the ground floor, and the Washington, Arlington, and Falls Church and the projected Great Falls and Old Dominion were to cross the Potomac from Rosslyn on the Aqueduct Bridge, entering the second and third floors respectively on steel trestles. But the Virginia companies never used it and the Metropolitan only sparingly. The Washington and Great Falls took over the third floor. The station, known today as the Georgetown Car Barn, opened on May 27, 1897, and contained Washington's only cable loop.

On September 29, 1897, the Capital Traction Company's powerhouse at 14th and E NW burned down and the city took the site for its Municipal Building. The company replaced the cable cars it served with an electric system, using horses in the interim. The electric wire for the cars was placed in the old cable system's underground conduit. The 14th Street branch switched to electric power on February 27, 1898, the Pennsylvania Avenue division on April 20, 1898 (March 20 west of the Capitol), and the 7th Street branch on May 26, 1898.

In the spring of 1899, Capital Traction replaced the underground conduit system that delivered power to its streetcars where overhead trolley poles were forbidden. The Love conduit system and its balky trolley wheels originally installed by the Rock Creek Railway were changed to the more standard and less expensive contact shoe. At the same time, the place where cars changed between the Capital Traction and Metropolitan systems was moved from U and 18th Streets, the original city terminus of the Rock Creek Railway, to the Calvert Street Loop, just east of the Calvert Street Bridge over Rock Creek. Service on the old line on Florida Avenue between 18th and Connecticut was discontinued that year and the track removed.

In 1904, "Power for the entire conduit system is furnished from a power station of 2,625-kilowatt capacity, located on the Chesapeake and Ohio Canal, between Thirty-second and Potomac Streets northwest. Power for the overhead line is furnished by a station situated at the northern terminus of the Chevy Chase line."

=== Expansion ===
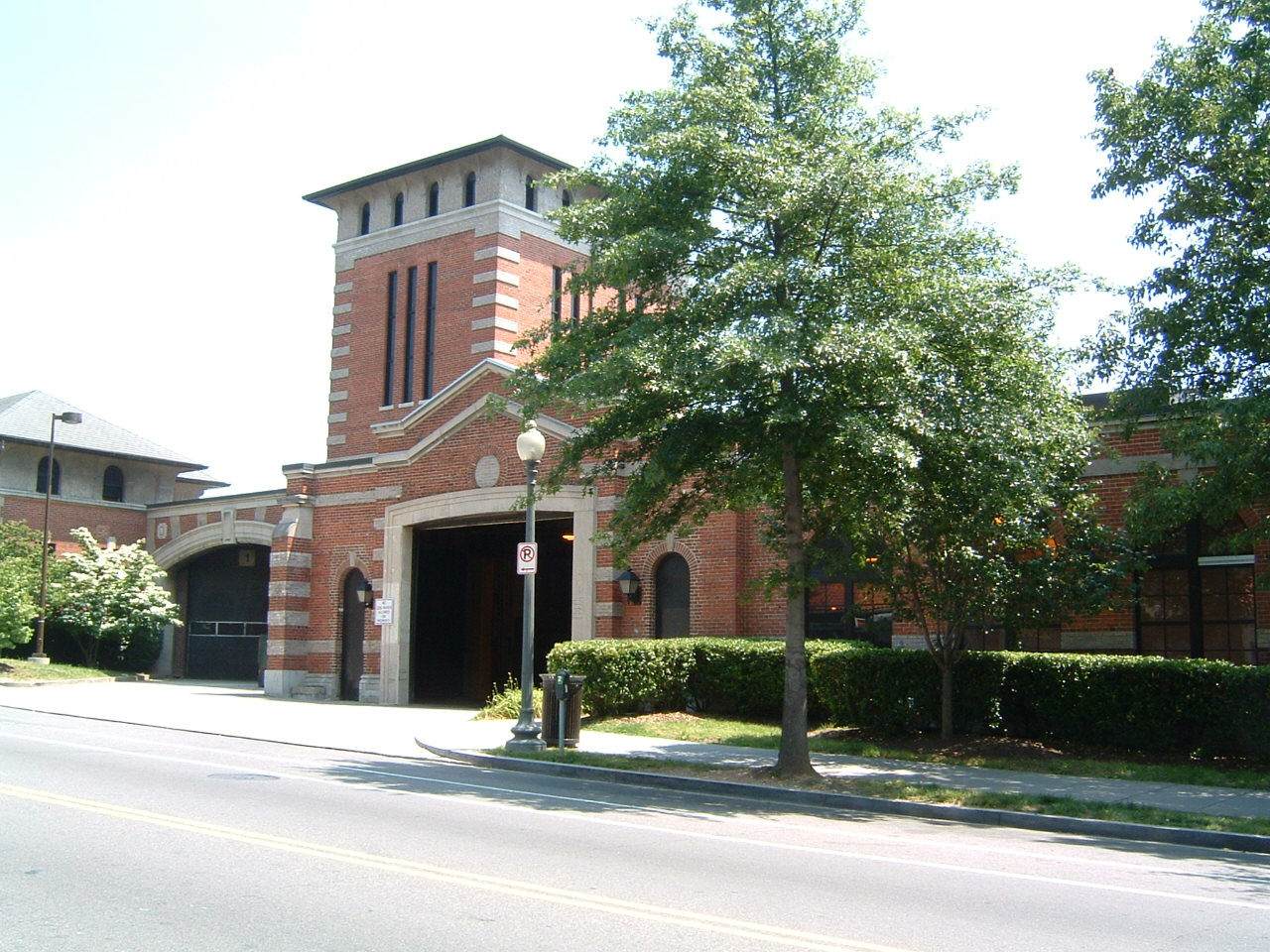
The Decatur Street Car Barn, built in 1906 by Capital Traction. This barn would later become WMATA's Northern division until it closed in 2019 for rehabilitation.

In 1906, Capital Traction built the Decatur Street Car Barn and extended the 14th Street line north to reach it. Further expansion came with Congressional approval on May 23, 1908. First, three new connections were built to serve Washington Union Station east of downtown. Connections were made from New Jersey Avenue, F Street NE, and from the spur to the B&O station. Second, a new crosstown line was laid down on Florida Avenue to Gallaudet University and south along Eighth Street where it connected to the Pennsylvania Avenue line and the Navy Yard. Trains began serving Union Station on June 24, 1908, and the other lines were completed soon thereafter. During this time the 14th street line was expanded north to Colorado Avenue where it connected with the Baltimore and Washington Transit Company's Kennedy Avenue line.

In 1910, Capital Traction began construction on a power house in Georgetown to power its streetcars. The facility opened on the waterfront in 1912.

In 1916 Capital Traction took ownership of the Washington and Maryland and its 2.591 miles (4.170 km) of track.

Streetcars were unionized in 1916 when Local 689 of the Amalgamated Association of Street, Electric Railway and Motor Coach Employees of America won recognition after a three-day strike.

As the Key Bridge was under construction in the early 1920s, Capital Traction sought to expand its operations across the Potomac River to Virginia. The company struck a deal with the Washington & Old Dominion Railroad, which had operated from Virginia to a terminal next to Capital Traction's Georgetown car barn: the W&OD did not seek rights to operate on the new bridge, and in exchange, Capital Traction built a new terminal for the Virginia railroad next to its Rosslyn loop. The D.C. company began operations on the new bridge in 1923.

=== The end of the line ===
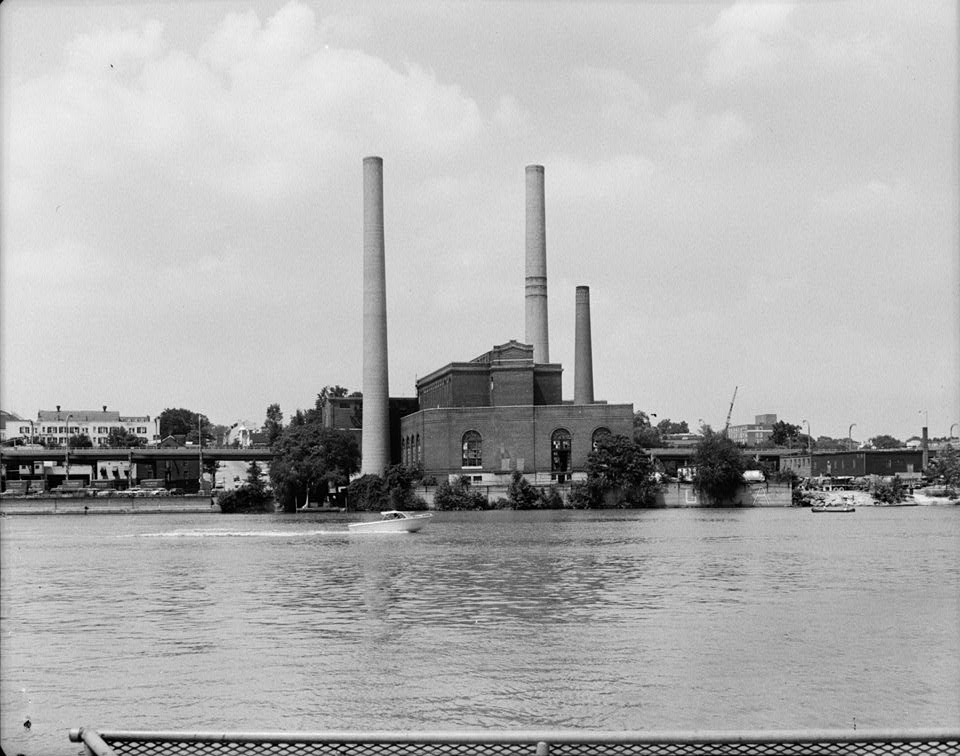
The former Capital Traction Power House on the Georgetown waterfront. Built in 1910-11 it was shut down in 1933, decommissioned in 1943 and demolished in 1968.

The North American Company, a transit and utilities holding company, began to acquire stock in Washington Railway in 1922, gaining a controlling interest by 1928. By December 31, 1933, it owned 50.016% of the voting stock.

North American tried to purchase Capital Traction as well, but Capital Traction always remained widely owned by the residents of Washington, without a principal stock holder. North American never owned more than 2.5% of Capital Traction stock.

The Great Depression hurt transit companies' revenue. On December 1, 1933, Washington Railway, Capital Traction, and Washington Rapid Transit, a bus company, merged to form the Capital Transit Company. Washington Railway continued as a holding company, owning 50% of Capital Transit and 100% of PEPCO, but Capital Traction was dissolved. For the first time, street railways in Washington were under the management of one company.

Today, parts of the former lines are run by various Metrobus Routes.

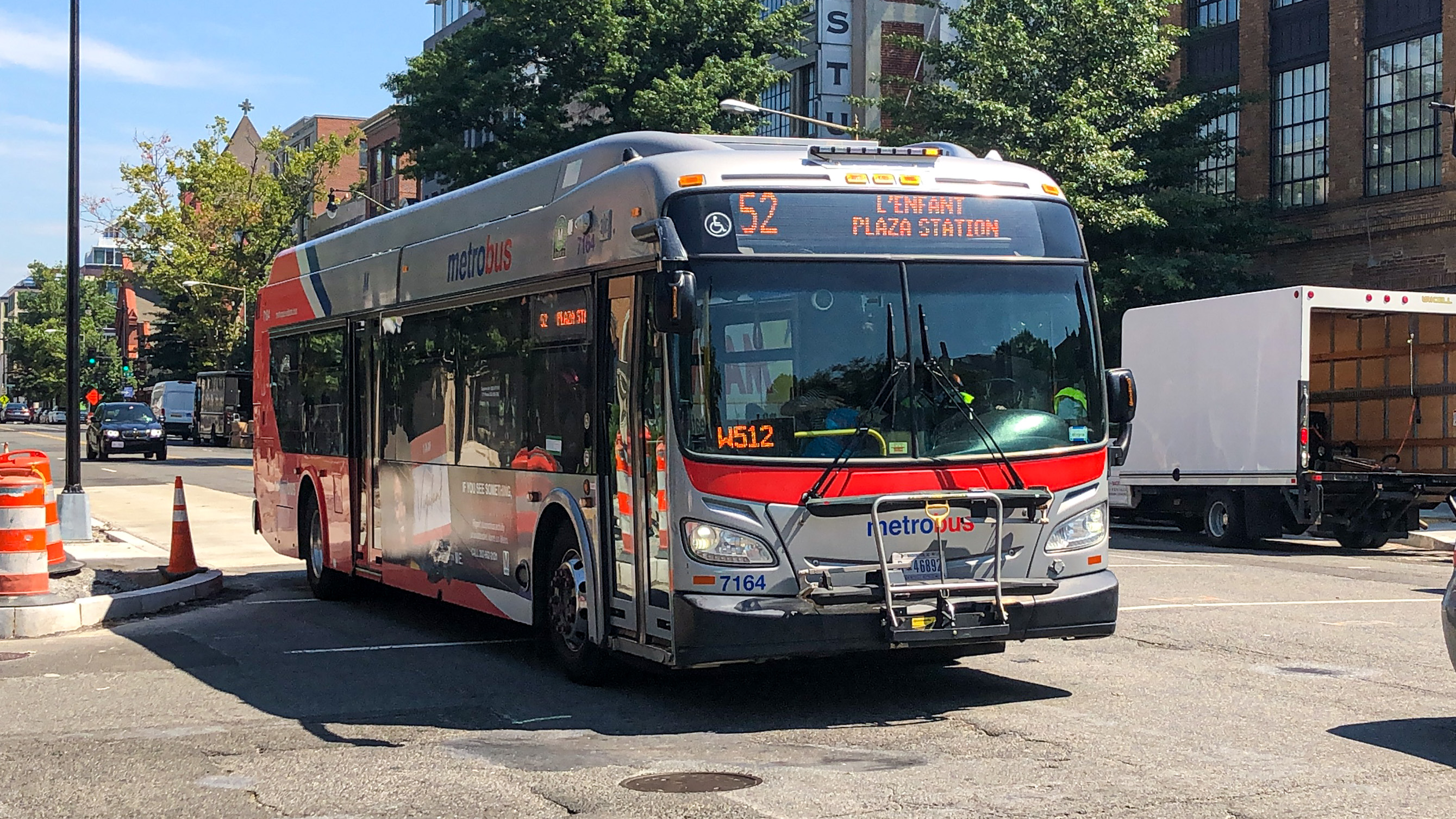
Metrobus Route 52 running along 14th Street

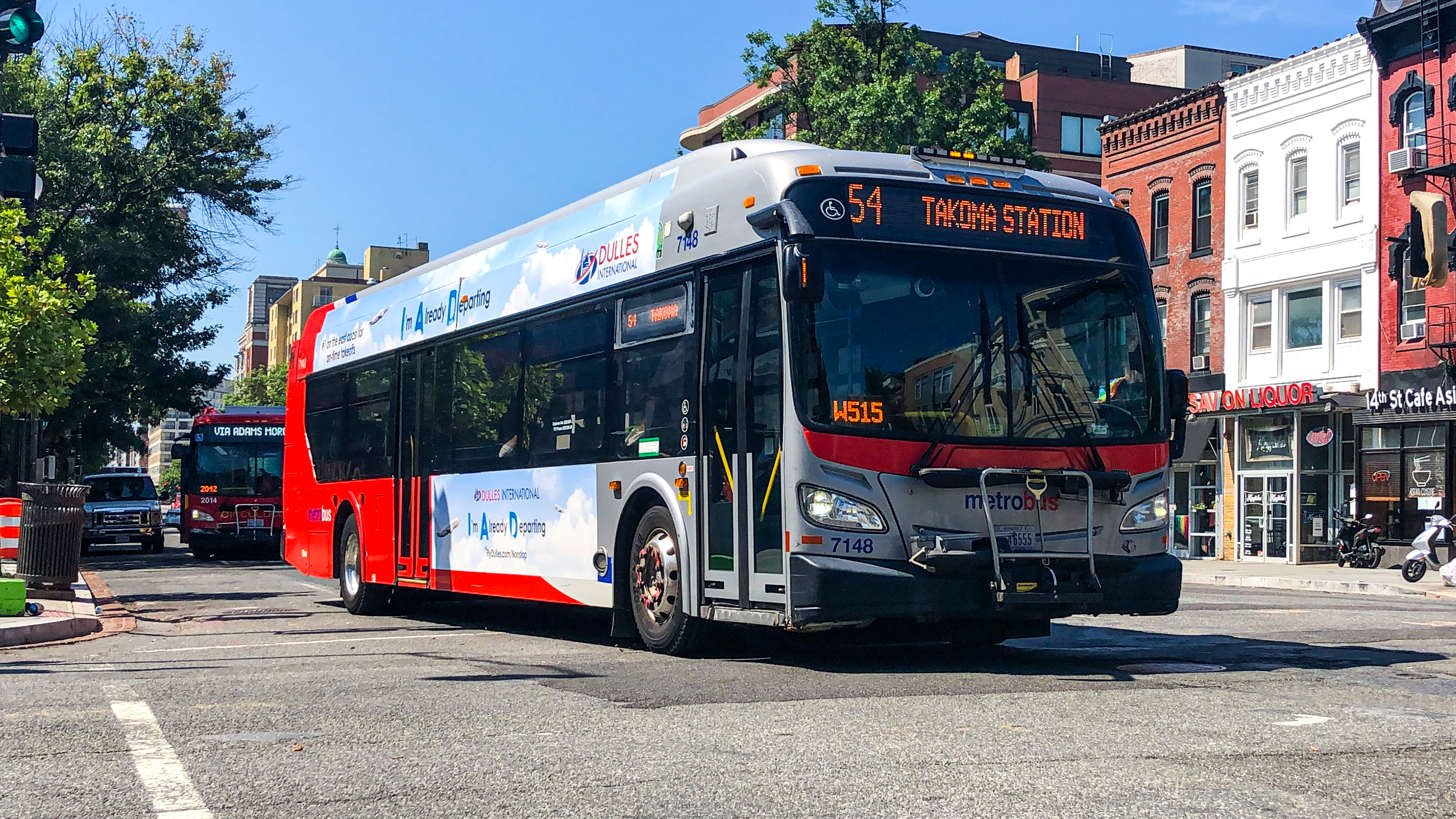
Metrobus Route 54 running along 14th Street
