= MetroAccess =

Paratransit service in the Washington, DC metropolitan area

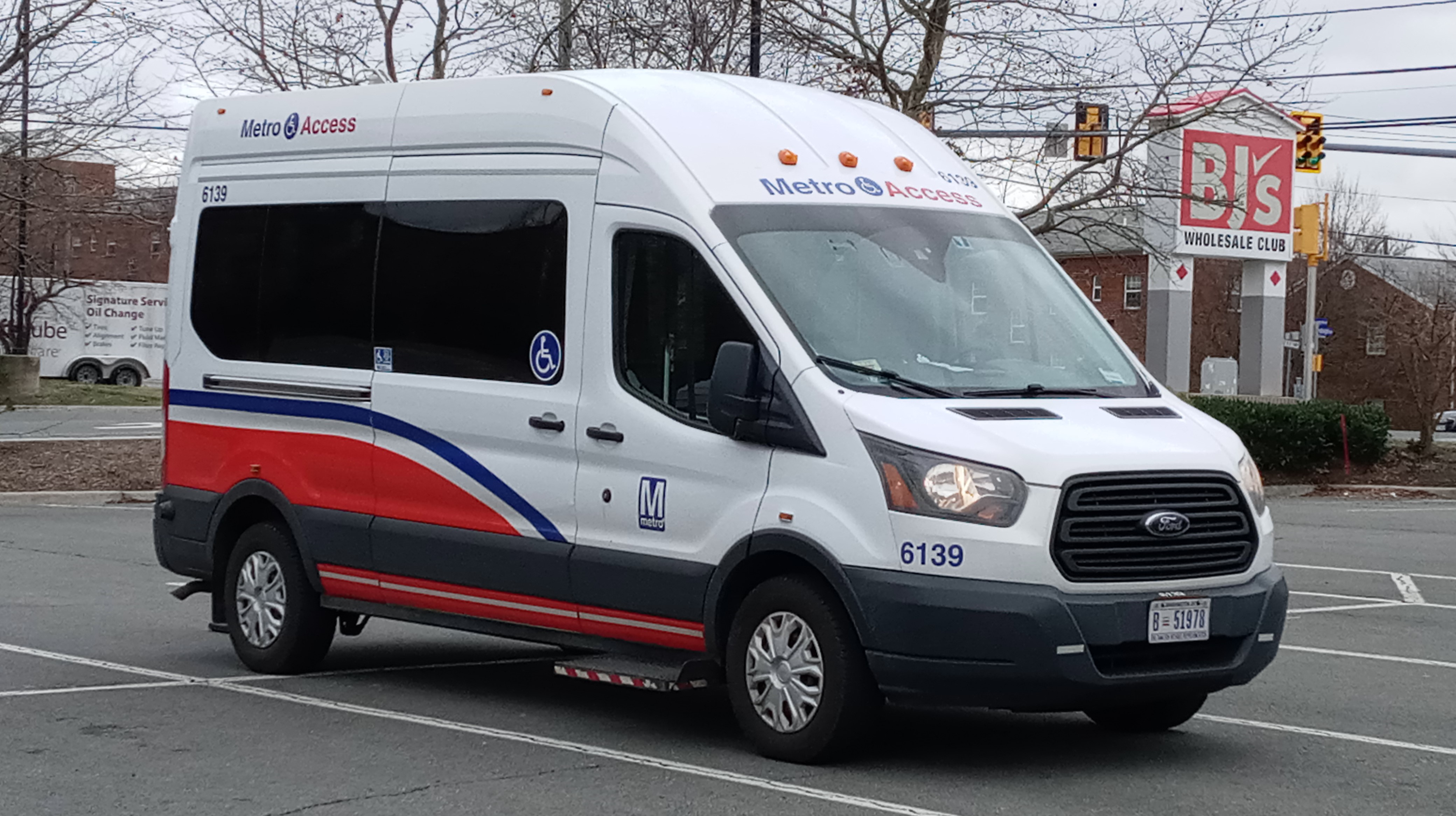
- MetroAccess vehicle in Falls Church, Virginia
- Parent: Washington Metropolitan Area Transit Authority
- Founded: May 16, 1994; 32 years ago
- Headquarters: 600 Fifth Street NW, Washington, D.C., U.S. 20001
- Service area: Washington metropolitan area
- Destinations: Transit Zone
- Daily ridership: ~6,576 (average)
- Annual ridership: Approx. 2,400,000
- Fuel type: Gasoline or diesel
- Operator: Various transit providers under contract to WMATA
- Website: Official website

MetroAccess is a shared-ride public transportation service for individuals in the Washington, D.C. metropolitan area who are unable to use fixed-route public transit due to disability. It is managed by the Washington Metropolitan Area Transit Authority (WMATA) and is operated by various companies that contract to provide the service. "Shared ride" means that multiple passengers may ride together in the same vehicle.

== Region covered ==
The service provides daily trips throughout the Transit Zone in the Washington Metropolitan region. The Transit Zone consists of the District of Columbia, the Maryland counties of Montgomery County and Prince George's County, the Virginia counties of Arlington County and Fairfax County, and the cities of Alexandria, Fairfax and Falls Church. Rides are offered in the same service areas and during the same hours of operation as Metrorail and Metrobus. The service is provided by the Washington Metropolitan Area Transit Authority, and is the region's complementary paratransit service offered in accordance with the Americans with Disabilities Act (ADA). MetroAccess began operation in May 1994, and since then, annual ridership has grown from 200,000 to over 2.4 million passengers.

MetroAccess operates 365 days a year, providing door-to-door, shared rides reserved from one to seven days in advance. Its fares are two times the fastest comparable fixed-route fare, with a maximum fare of $4.00. Customers are required to pay the fare to the driver in cash prior to boarding the vehicle or by using Metro's EZ-Pay Program, the trip origin and destination must be within 3/4 mile of fixed-route service (a bus stop or rail station). MetroAccess service hours and locations coincide with those of Metro's bus and rail services, with the exception of express routes such as those serving Dulles International Airport.

Eligibility for paratransit service is defined in the ADA as being based on an individual's "inability to use public transit" due to a disability, and in some cases, this inability is a result of either accessible services not being offered at the desired time of travel or the absence of an accessible pathway to a nearby bus stop or rail station. Eligibility determinations are made by MetroAccess' Office of Eligibility.

Metro has worked to encourage and facilitate the use of fixed-route transit by its customers with disabilities. For MetroAccess customers who have an occasional or conditional ability to use existing fixed-route public transit, Metro offers its fixed-route services free of charge. This incentive decreases demand for the more costly paratransit service by shifting disabled customers to existing bus and rail services according to customer choice and ability. Those who do not have an inability to use public transit, but who do have a qualifying disability may be eligible for Metro's reduced (half) fare Disability ID card. MetroAccess service is provided by a primary contractor-broker with multiple subcontractors and taxicab providers. It is now the fourth-largest paratransit service in the United States with a fleet of over 650 vehicles and well over 1,000 employees.

In November 2016, MetroAccess replaced its photo ID access card with a personalized SmarTrip card, allowing MetroAccess users to ride buses for free, and use the faregates on Metrorail to take rides at no charge instead of entering via the emergency gate.
