= Anacostia station =

Washington Metro station

Coordinates: 38°51′43.6″N 76°59′43.1″W

Anacostia
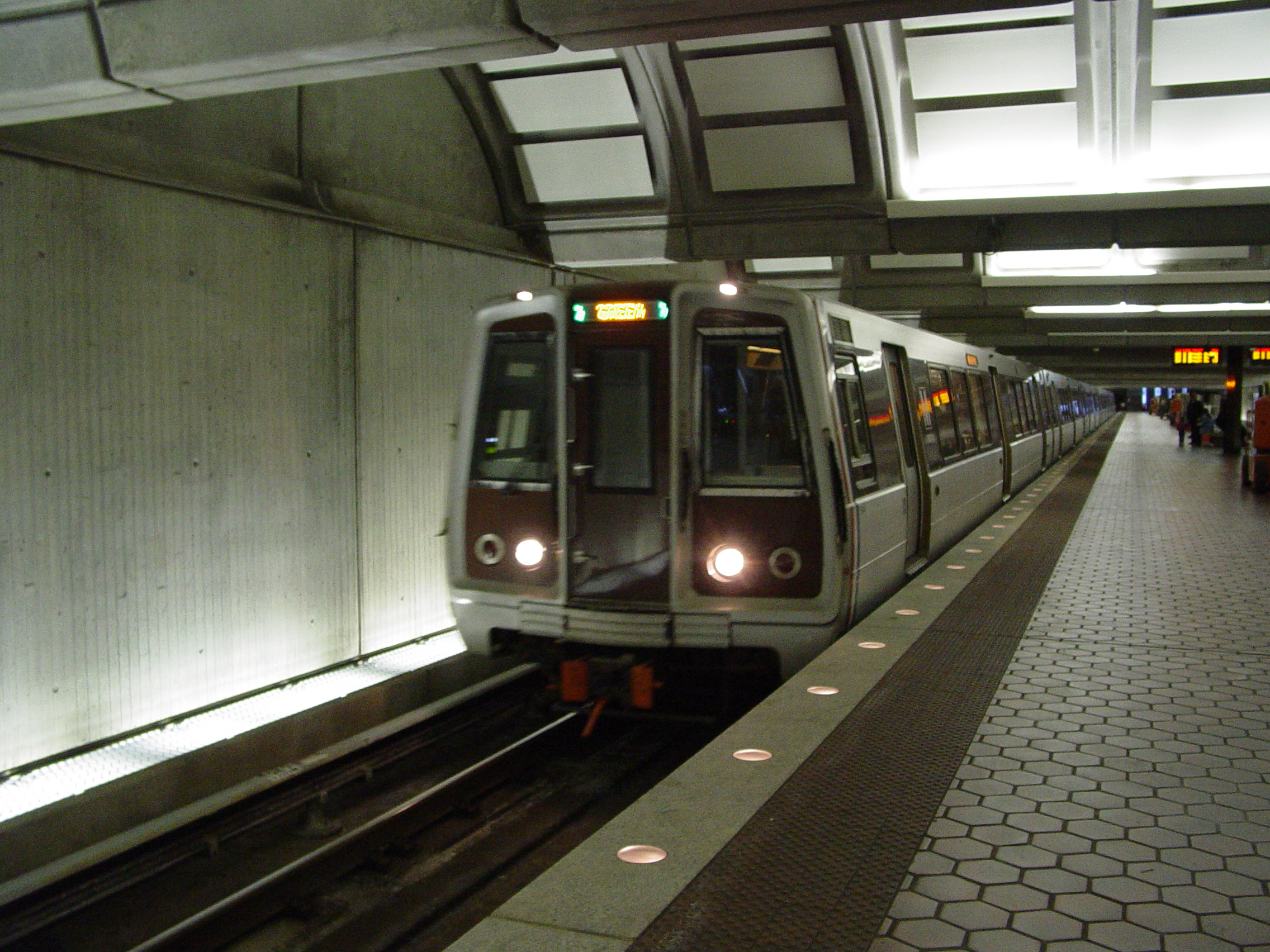
- A southbound train arrives at the station in October 2006

General information
- Location: 1101 Howard Rd SE; Washington, D.C.
- Owner: WMATA
- Platforms: 1 island platform
- Tracks: 2
- Connections: Metrobus: C11, C13, C15, C17, C21, C23, C25, C26, C29, C31, C41, C51

Construction
- Structure type: Underground
- Parking: 808 spaces
- Cycle facilities: Capital Bikeshare, 13 racks and 8 lockers
- Accessible: Yes

Other information
- Station code: F06

History
- Opened: December 28, 1991; 34 years ago

Passengers
- 2025: 5,084 (average weekday)
- Rank: 29 of 98

Services
Preceding station	Washington Metro	Following station
Congress Heights toward Branch Avenue	Green Line	Navy Yard–Ballpark toward Greenbelt
Route map
Location

Anacostia station is a Washington Metro station in Washington, D.C., on the Green Line. The station is located in the Anacostia neighborhood of Southeast Washington, with entrances at Shannon Place and Howard Road near Martin Luther King, Jr. Avenue SE (a major street serving the southeastern portion of the city). The station serves as a hub for Metrobus routes in Southeast, Washington, D.C., and Prince George's County, Maryland.

== Station layout ==
The architecture at Anacostia is unusual. Due to cost considerations and the station's shallow depth, the usual arched ceiling was abandoned in favor of flat concrete walls and a ceiling of small barrel vaults (oriented perpendicular to the tracks) similar to the upper coffers in the six-coffer arch station design. The station is an underground stop because the distance between the Anacostia River tunnels and the station is too short to have permitted an above-ground stop. The station has entrances on both sides of DC-295/I-295 (Anacostia Freeway), which necessitated the construction of a slightly longer platform than would be necessary to accommodate trains. In addition, there are no pylons at platform-level at Anacostia.

Because of a 1978 consent decree between Metro and a coalition of handicapped persons' advocacy groups, the Anacostia Metro station was one of three originally planned Metrorail stations to have a redundant elevator when it first opened, with the other two being Huntington and Forest Glen, though some original stations have gained such elevators through station renovations and expansions.

=== Streetcar service ===
The Metro station was slated to have a transfer to a stop on the Anacostia Line of the DC Streetcar trolley system. However, in August 2010, District of Columbia Department of Transportation (DDOT) officials ordered streetcar construction shut down after city officials refused to extend the construction contract or give a new contract to another firm.

=== Artwork ===
External image
- "River Spirits of the Anacostia by Martha Jackson Jarvis

The station also contains a work of public art which reflects on the history and culture of the community. River Spirits of the Anacostia is a glass mosaic tile frieze completed in 2004 by Martha Jackson-Jarvis. The mosaic, (4 by 400 ft (1.2 by 121.9 m)) is placed along the roof-line of the Metro station and depicts the aquatic life of the river showing fish, plants, birds and other wildlife of the Anacostia River. The work was commissioned by way of a contest by the D.C. Commission on the Arts and Humanities.

== History ==
=== Controversy over building the Green Line ===
==== Master plan ====
Metro drew up its original master plan for its planned 103-mile (166 km) system in 1968. At that time, a Green Line was planned to pass through some of the area's poorest and most transit-dependent neighborhoods and provide them with subway service. The southern part of the Green Line was originally to pass over the 11th Street Bridges to the intersection of Good Hope Road SE and Martin Luther King, Jr. Avenue SE. The line was originally scheduled to open in 1976. The site of the Anacostia station, set for the intersection of Martin Luther King Jr. Avenue and Good Hope Road SE, led to concerns that the station would destroy historic Old Anacostia, and after pressure from the federal government Metro moved the site of the station to Howard Road SE. By the end of 1977, Metro had pushed the opening of the Green Line to June 1983. Increasing construction costs and financing problems (primarily caused by the inability of local governments to contribute their share of Metro's funding) led Metro to consider whether to shift the Green Line to a more southerly route along Wheeler Road SE to terminate near Rosecroft Raceway.

In January 1978, a Metro regional task force approved a Green Line route in Anacostia that followed Martin Luther King, Jr. Avenue and then Wheeler Road down to the Beltway (with a new station added near St. Elizabeths Hospital). But the Prince George's County government demanded in May 1978 that Metro choose the Suitland Parkway-to-Rosecroft route instead, a change Metro agreed to. Metro announced in November 1978 that it had secured funding to build the Green Line from Gallery Place to Waterfront and that construction was nearly complete on this portion of the line, but that funding did not exist to push the line from Waterfront to Anacostia. Nonetheless, Metro reiterated its intent to complete the extension to Anacostia station by late 1983.

==== 1980 troubles and near-cancellation ====
Funding troubles delayed construction even further. In March 1980, Maryland officials worried that high inflation would leave Metro without enough funds to complete the Green Line, forcing Maryland to pay these construction costs alone. These fears were confirmed in part in September 1980 when Metro announced that inflation had created a $16 million shortfall in its $271 million budget. By then, Anacostia residents were increasingly angry at the repeated delays in building the Green Line. In September 1980, D.C. City Council member Jerry A. Moore, Jr. delivered a petition containing 1,000 signatures from Anacostia residents demanding sped up Green Line construction.

In October 1980, The Washington Post ran a major article asking "What Ever Happened to the Green Line?" in which the newspaper concluded: "The 18.86 miles (30.35 km) Green Line, which some argue should have been the first built because it would serve the most disadvantaged sections of the Washington area, is last on the construction list and threatened with extinction." The article confirmed that funds were in place and contracts signed to complete the Green Line to the proposed Anacostia Station at Howard Road SE and Martin Luther King, Jr. Avenue SE, but that repeated local opposition in Maryland to the line's actual location had forced planners to delay final siting of the line inside the District of Columbia. Additionally, Maryland businessmen argued that the switch of the terminus from Branch Avenue to Rosecroft Raceway had economically harmed them, and they filed a suit in the United States District Court for the District of Maryland demanding a halt to construction of the Green Line until the line's route could be again reconsidered.

==== Legal and funding battles ====
In December 1978, Metro announced that cost considerations had forced it to abandon the high-vault ceiling design for all unbuilt stations (except Navy Yard), and that a less-costly design would be used at the Anacostia station. In late 1978 and 1979, a controversy erupted over parking at the planned station. In 1978, Metro proposed building a 2,000-space parking lot on the west side of the Anacostia Freeway. Angry residents, protesting the amount of traffic which would come into their residential neighborhood, forced Metro to reduce the size of the parking lot to 1,300 spaces. In January 1979, Metro proposed building a 500-space parking garage at the proposed Anacostia station, and adding another 800 temporary spaces by paving over a part of Anacostia Park (to be removed once additional parking was built at the terminus of the Green Line at Rosecroft). But residents resisted this plan as well on the grounds that too much traffic would clog local streets. (These concerns were resolved in March 1980.) By July 1979, despite the release of billions of dollars in construction funds by the U.S. Department of Transportation, Metro had pushed the construction of the Anacostia station to mid-1985 and the completion of the Branch Avenue Line to late 1986. But construction deadlines continued to slip. Despite reaffirming its Branch Avenue Line construction deadlines in December 1979, in January 1980 Metro announced that completion of the Green Line terminus would be pushed back six more months to 1987. In January 1981, Metro admitted that the station would not open until 1990 due to funding constraints.

Controversies regarding the siting of the Green Line continued, however. In May 1980, a group of business owners sued Metro on the grounds that the decision to change the course of the Green Line was illegal because it had been undertaken without a public hearing (in violation of Metro's rules). In February 1981, Judge Norman Park Ramsey of the U.S. District for Maryland ruled against Metro, Metro's appeal failed, and on March 16, 1982, Judge Ramsey barred Metro from spending any money on the construction of the Rosecroft Raceway route for the southern half of the Green Line. District residents also protested the siting of the route. Advisory Neighborhood Commission (ANC) 6C (an elected local governmental body advising the District government on neighborhood issues) asked Metro to move the Anacostia Metro station from its proposed location on Howard Road between Firth Sterling Avenue SE and Martin Luther King, Jr., Avenue SE to the intersection of Good Hope Road SE and Anacostia Drive SE. In May 1981, Metro changed its estimate for the opening of the Anacostia station to early 1988. Metro estimated on December 9, 1981, that the Anacostia station would open in late 1989.

==== Federal delays ====
Construction of the Anacostia station was also delayed by a land controversy involving the federal government. Metro planned to tunnel under the Anacostia River to connect the Anacostia station with the proposed Navy Yard station, but the south end of the tunnel would have required the relocation of a 25-acre (100,000 m^{2}) plant nursery maintained by the federal government to provide Congress with flowers and trees. Because the nursery was on federally owned land, moving it required an Act of Congress. The District of Columbia agreed to provide $29 million in federally provided highway funds to move the nursery (arguing that the land would be used to build a parking garage and lot for use by commuters using the Anacostia station), but the Federal Highway Administration ruled the funds could not be used for this purpose. The delay threatened to push the station's opening to 1990, and some officials worried that by then funds to build the Green Line would have run out. Metro proposed moving the nursery to Camp Simms, a former U.S. Army campground in the Congress Heights neighborhood. But construction on the Green Line was suspended for nearly two years due to federal budget cuts (see below), and in March 1983 the Architect of the Capitol agreed to move the nursery to a parcel of land in the Bellevue neighborhood. The United States House and Senate passed legislation approving the move in March and June 1984, respectively.

But even as the nursery resitting issue was resolved, funding problems delayed construction on the station. Despite the funding troubles, Metro planned to seek contractors in March 1982 for a $60 million contract to tunnel under the Anacostia River, a $60 million contract to build the Anacostia station, and a $100 million contract to build the Navy Yard station.

In October 1982, Metro estimated that opening of the Green Line to Anacostia would happen in the "late 1980s," and in November the Metro staff report recommended construction of the Rosecroft Raceway route.

More cuts in federal construction funds for Metro further delayed construction of the Anacostia station. Metro announced in December 1982 that the station would not open until late 1989 at the earliest. Metro, for the first time in its history, formally announced that (absent full construction funding) it could not build the Green Line, the Red Line from Wheaton to Glenmont, or the Yellow Line from Franconia-Springfield to King Street–Old Town.

==== District court appeal ====
As Metro struggled to secure construction funding for the Green Line and Anacostia station, it also struggled to lift the district court's injunction on Green Line construction. Metro asked the court to allow construction of the Navy Yard, Anacostia and Congress Heights stations pending a decision on the Green Line route in Prince George's County, but the court refused. More than 23,000 Anacostia residents signed a public petition demanding that the line be built. Metro declined to appeal Judge Ramsey's latest ruling. Frustrated by funding constraints and the court injunction, Metro released a proposed "final" system map in December 1983 which showed the Green Line terminating at the Anacostia and Mount Vernon Square stations.

==== Resolution of controversies ====
Metro opened negotiations with Prince George's County officials in 1984 to win their approval to build the Green Line from the L'Enfant Plaza Station to Anacostia. After four days of negotiations, Metro, D.C. and Prince George's County officials reached an agreement to begin construction of the Green Line from L'Enfant Plaza to Anacostia, pending resolution of the line's final route by December 6, 1984. The agreement called for construction of the Green Line to Waterfront Station in the summer, siting of the tunnel under the Anacostia River by June 28, and the holding of public hearings on the remaining route between July 18 and August 3. The U.S. federal district court approved the agreement on March 7. Following the ruling, Metro announced that it would build the Anacostia station on Howard Road between Martin Luther King, Jr. Avenue SE and the Anacostia Freeway as well as a new Metro station at the Washington Navy Yard and open the Green Line by 1990. Metro asked and won approval from the court to build the Navy Yard and Anacostia stations and the tunnel in mid-June 1984.

Metro also began new political efforts to secure funding to complete the transit system. Initially, Reagan administration officials balked at this plan, reiterating that they would not permit Metro to build more than 76.4 miles (123.0 km) of subway. But in June, House and Senate committees passed legislation requiring the Reagan administration to release all funds appropriated for Metro, putting pressure on the administration to rescind its 76.4-mile (123.0 km) limit.

=== Constructing the Green Line and Anacostia ===
Metro issued a call for bids to tunnel under the Anacostia River in July 1984, and awarded the $25.6 million contract to the firm of Harrison Western/Franki-Denys (a joint venture) in December 1984. The debate over the route for the remainder of the Green Line was finally resolved in December 1984 when the original route was re-selected. The U.S. district court approved Metro's decision. Funding for Green Line construction fell into place in 1985. Construction on the line started in 1985. Survey and clearing work for the twin 2,500-foot (760 m) Anacostia River tunnels began in March 1985. The completion date for the two tunnels was estimated at late 1987.

==== Parking garage problems ====
A major controversy over parking at the Anacostia station occurred as well. In 1981, Metro had proposed building 1,000 parking spaces in a three-level parking garage and 300 spaces at a ground-level parking lot at the station and using interstate highway funds to pay for them. Metro officials argued the facility was highway-related, since it provided parking, but the Federal Highway Administration refused to allow the District of Columbia use its funds to pay for the parking garage. Local citizens also opposed the parking garage in favor of ground-level-only parking at the station, and demanded that Metro provide more connecting bus routes at the proposed station. These disagreements were put off as Metro officials and others focused on getting the Green Line built, but by 1985 the parking garage remained part of the station's overall transportation and construction plan. Metro solicited bids for an $11 million contract to build the parking garage in early 1985, but rejected all bids when the lowest bidder failed to meet minority-contracting standards. In May 1985, Metro officials still maintained that construction on the parking garage would begin in June.

In a second round of bidding, the winning contractor met the standard, but the cost of the parking garage had now risen by $900,000 to $11.9 million. But the second winning bid was also rejected after transit officials said they inadvertently misstated minority-contracting and minimum wage standards in the contracting process.

Metro relaxed its minority-contracting requirement from 35 percent to 25 percent, and after a third round of bidding awarded a $12.6 million contract for the parking garage to the Kiewit Construction Co. The bid was more than $1.6 million higher than the rejected second-round bid. Construction on the three-level parking structure was well under way by April 1986.

==== Station construction ====
Metro's board awarded a $41.5 million contract for the construction of the Anacostia station to Kiewit Construction Co. in June 1985, and said the station would open in 1990. Ground was broken at the site on September 21, 1985. A significant number of prehistoric artifacts were found during the station's excavation. Rubble from the station's construction was dumped on the south side of Good Hope Road SE between 24th Street SE and Altamont Place SE (where the Woodmont Crossing housing project was built in 2002). Exit 3B (Howard Road) on southbound I-295 was closed to construct Anacostia station, blocking traffic from reaching South Capitol Street. Although above-ground construction ended in late 1989, the exit remained closed until December 1991 so that its reopening would coincide with the Anacostia station opening. In July 1991, Metro paid an additional $1 million to install stronger escalator treads at the nine planned Green Line stations (including Anacostia) as well as the Wheaton and Van Dorn Street stations after discovering that the escalator treads it had ordered were insufficiently strong.

Funding for construction of the station and the Green Line was threatened again in 1986, but lengthy negotiations and heavy pressure from Congress led to the release of $400 million on July 16, 1986. Construction proceeded quickly thereafter. On March 23, 1986, the second of the two 2,450-foot (750 m), concrete-lined tunnels under the Anacostia River was completed. In December 1988, Metro reaffirmed that the Waterfront, Navy Yard, and Anacostia stations would open in late 1991.

The first Metro budget which contained funds for operating the Green Line was proposed in December 1989, and it requested funds to test the soon-to-open Green Line from Gallery Place-Chinatown to the Anacostia station. The budget also projected that the Green Line from Gallery Place-Chinatown to the Anacostia station would open in 1991, and that new Metrobus service will be added in Prince George's County to bring commuters to the new station. The cost of testing and operating the Green Line left Metro struggling financially. These costs (along with costs associated with extending and operating the Blue Line to Van Dorn Street) forced Metro to cut 335 jobs as well as supplies, travel, overtime and temporary employee budgets. Although ridership was projected to rise 3.8 percent to 260 million trips in the coming year, the increased revenue was not expected to cover the costs of operating the new lines and stations.

=== Station opening ===
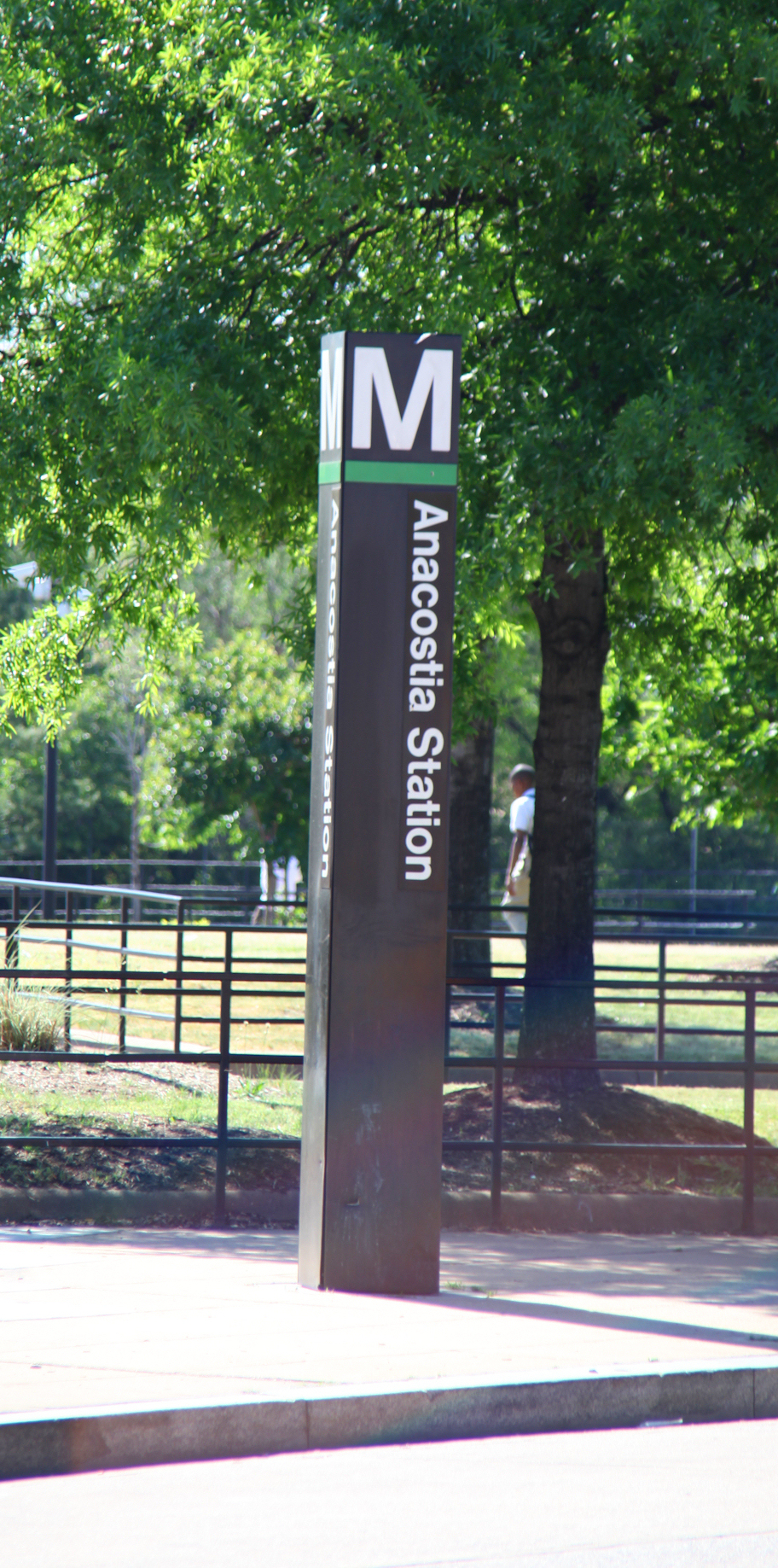
Exterior pylon at the Anacostia Metro Station (on Howard Road SE).

The Mount Vernon Square, Shaw-Howard University, and U Street stations opened in May 1991.

Metro announced on September 6, 1991, that the Green Line from L'Enfant Plaza to Anacostia would open on December 28, 1991. Only 983 parking spaces would be available at the station upon its opening (673 of them in the parking garage). One hundred and fifty Anacostia residents rode a special preview train along the line on December 21.

The Green Line from L'Enfant Plaza to Anacostia opened on schedule at 8:00 AM on December 28. The $286 million extension added 2.88 miles (4.63 km) to the rail system. Although Metro had estimated in September 1991 that 60,000 riders would board daily at the three stations, this number had fallen to just 30,700 riders a day by early December 1991 and to just 28,000 on December 28. Metro estimated 20,000 riders a day would board at Anacostia station alone by late June 1992. Fearing a boycott of the station due to ongoing disputes over bus service in Anacostia (see below), Metro sent large numbers of extra station managers and supervisors into the Anacostia station on the first workday it was open to help commuters decide whether to take rail or bus, and which bus routes to take. Metro said 1,854 people boarded at Anacostia, 459 boarded at Waterfront, and 127 boarded at Navy Yard on the first workday.

==== Ridership ====
Ridership continued to expand rapidly on the Green Line. In the first workweek of the year, more than 8,000 riders a day boarded at the three stations (more than 5,000 of them at Anacostia), exceeding Metro's estimates. Although nearly 10,000 riders were boarding each day at the three stations by the third week of January, Metro nonetheless handed out free rail passes (the first free rail pass giveaway in the transit agency's history) to customers at the three stations to encourage ridership. By March 1992, the number of weekday riders had risen to nearly 11,000 per day at Anacostia station alone.

==== Parking ====
Initially, parking at the Anacostia station was low. Only an average of 275 people parked each day at the station's parking garage and parking lot by March 1992. To encourage parking, in April 1992 Metro offered half-price parking coupons to encourage commuters to use the Anacostia parking spaces. Metro also held public hearings in Maryland to learn why commuters did not use the lot; crime was the highest concern. The campaign worked, and by November 1992 the lot was nearly full every weekday. In July 1993, District of Columbia officials canceled plans to build a $5.4 million ground-level parking lot at the Anacostia Metro station. The unused funds sat idle until 2004, when the District of Columbia finally used them to improve traffic signals, lighting, and pedestrian access along South Capitol Street between E Street SE and the Anacostia Metro station, and for the design of a new Frederick Douglass Memorial Bridge.

==== Extension ====
In 1995, Metro broke ground on the Suitland, Naylor Road, Southern Avenue, and Congress Heights stations, a $900 million project which would complete the final 6.5 miles (10.5 km) of the originally planned 103 miles (166 km) Metrorail system in late 1999. The Green Line's final five stations opened on January 13, 2001.

==== Controversy ====
Two major controversies, one over buses and one over the number of rail cars servicing the Green Line, occurred when the station opened.

==== Bus controversy ====
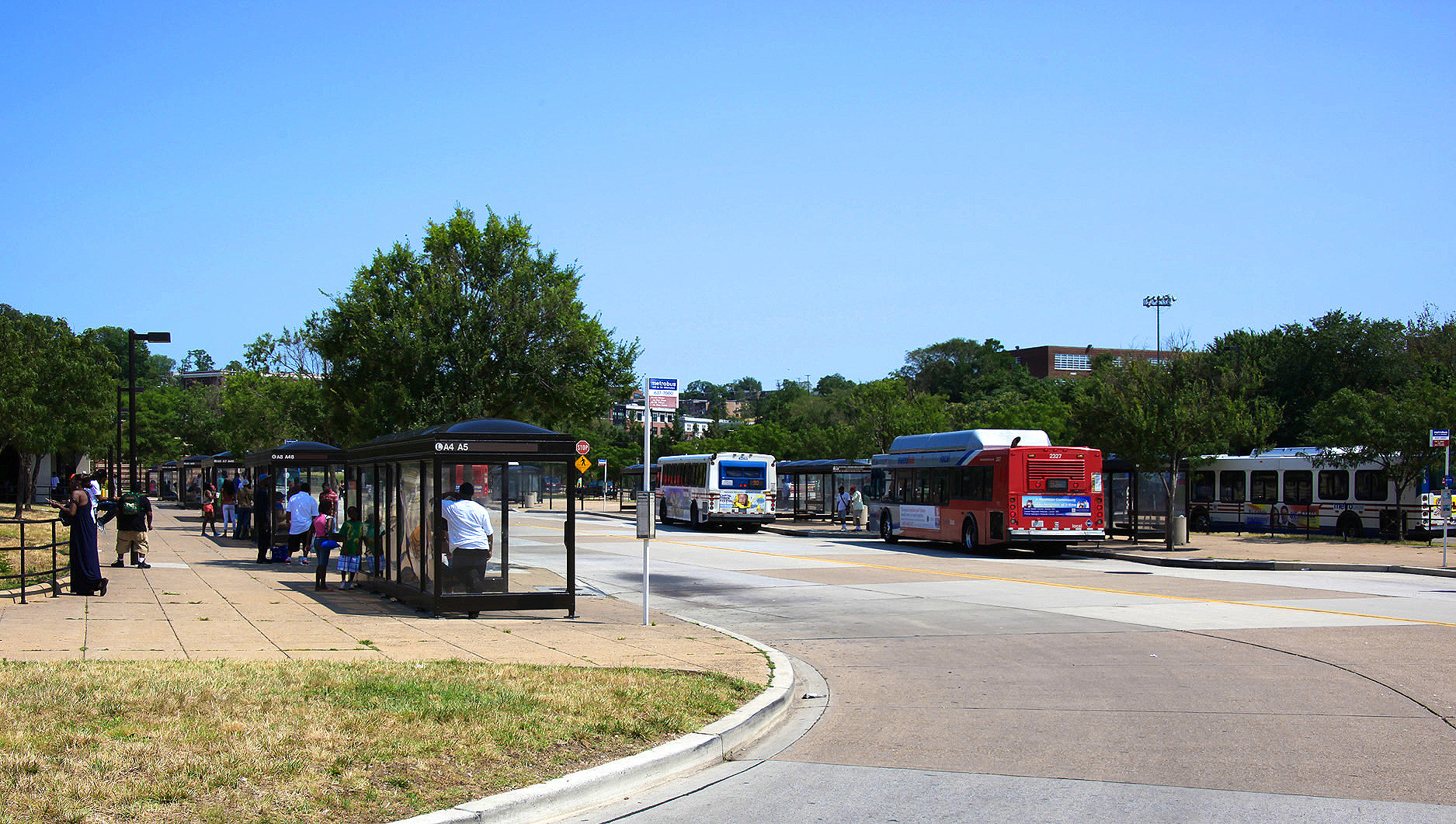
Extensive bus bays, added to the Anacostia station to accommodate the Prince George's County buses that never serviced the station

Like all Metro stations, the Anacostia station was intended to be a major hub for Metrobus service in its area. But with the Anacostia neighborhood being the poorest and most transit-dependent area in the District of Columbia, changes to bus routes in the area proved highly controversial.

As the opening of the Green Line to Anacostia neared, Metro proposed halving the number of bus routes traveling between Anacostia and the National Archives Building downtown—forcing riders to take the more expensive Metrorail and requiring many riders to walk several blocks to their destination (rather than the "virtually door-to-door service" they currently enjoyed). A total of 25 routes were changed, affecting more than 80,000 riders. Many of the new routes were designed to terminate at the Anacostia station rather than continue into downtown Washington, as they once had.

Metro officials admitted that fares for most Anacostia residents would rise an average of 50 percent, and that Anacostia residents would be forced to pay more and travel farther to access the services (such as doctors) and shopping most District residents had ready access to. To help mitigate the impact of the total fare increase on Anacostia residents, Metro reduced basic bus fares for many routes in the area from $1 to 35 cents. District residents protested the cuts with a picket line in front of Metro's downtown headquarters in late August 1991. Prince George's County residents, too, were angered by the bus route changes, arguing that Metro had promised more (not less) bus service and complaining that they would be forced to use a rail station located in the District of Columbia's most violent and crime-prone neighborhoods. More than 1,000 people packed "raucous" public hearings for three nights in the District and Prince George's County in early September, denouncing Metro and claiming they were "becoming a victim of transportational apartheid."

Worried about the impact of the cuts as well as a possible bus boycott, D.C. Mayor Sharon Pratt Dixon announced on September 11, 1991, that she would seek an alternative to the changes proposed by Metro. But suburban commuters were angry that Metro would keep the bus routes open in Anacostia (at an estimated cost of $4 million) when their bus service had been cut at the time Metrorail stations opened in their areas. But D.C. residents countered that poor African American District citizens could ill-afford the same transit changes and fare increases that wealthy, white suburbanites were asked to absorb. Calls for a boycott increased in mid-September. On September 16, 1991, declaring that the city paid "40 percent of the Metro subsidy, but we're the last to get service," Mayor Dixon threatened to withhold the District's payment to Metro unless the bus changes were rescinded. Metro officials were angered by Dixon's statement, saying District officials had been involved in the bus route planning process for months. Mayor Dixon proposed on September 20 that Metro continue to use the Anacostia station as a hub, but also continue bus service into downtown D.C. The plan (estimated to cost less than $500,000 a year) would require residents to transfer at Anacostia station but would not raise the total fare to more than $1. A month later, Metro's board of directors unanimously agreed to accept Dixon's plan, and cancelled all planned route changes in the District of Columbia and Prince George's County.

The cost of operating the bus routes totaled $2.5 million. Prince George's County, meanwhile, also announced that its county-run buses ("The Bus") would not run to Anacostia station as previously promised either, drawing outrage from D.C.'s representatives on Metro's board. The District of Columbia had spent more than $20 million adding bus bays at the station to accommodate The Bus arrivals. The compromise led residents to call off their boycott of Metrobus.

Two months after the Anacostia station opened, Metro said that a study of bus and rail ridership showed that the unaltered bus routes were costing the transit agency $200,000 a month in lost rail fares. To make up the lost revenue, Metro said it would run only two-car trains on the Green Line during slow periods weekdays and evenings and on Sundays beginning in June 1992. In November 1992, Metro reported that ridership at the Anacostia station was (on average) 7,500 riders a day, 700 below estimates. Metro admitted that although riders had made the switch from bus to rail, the lower ridership numbers due to the recession and not because of continuing bus service in the area. Metro said ridership on buses in the neighborhood was down significantly, and the transit agency reduced the number of buses on some routes to avoid having empty buses.

==== Bus conditions ====
Metro also encountered controversy over its plan to upgrade the conditions of the buses in the Anacostia area. A Metro survey in April 1991 found that the 75,000 bus riders in Anacostia were forced to use the dirtiest and most poorly maintained buses operated by the transit agency. Metro also admitted that although it had sent new buses to Southeast in 1983, the buses suffered from a high rate of breakdowns. Metro blamed the problem on its outdated and undersized bus garage at South Capitol and M Streets SE, and proposed building a new, much larger bus garage near the Anacostia Metro station for $30 million to $35 million. Metro originally planned for the bus garage to be built near the new Anacostia station, where many of the routes the buses ran terminated. But D.C. officials balked at that site (arguing the land should be used for development and would cost Metro an extra $3 million a year for 50 years to operate), and asked Metro to build a new bus garage at the site of the existing garage on M Street SE. Metro refused to budget money for that project, arguing that the Metro did not have the $40 million needed to buy additional land at the M Street site. In retaliation, D.C.'s representatives on Metro's board of directors vetoed funding for 16 of Metro's projects. The District of Columbia rezoned the land near the Anacostia station for commercial use in mid-1993, hoping to spur development in the area and prevent Metro from using the site for the bus garage. Washington Gas offered to lease 14 acres (57,000 m^{2}) in southeast Washington to Metro for the bus garage, but concerns over the $26 million cleanup costs for coal tar pollution at the site led to the rejection of this proposal.

=== Station operation ===
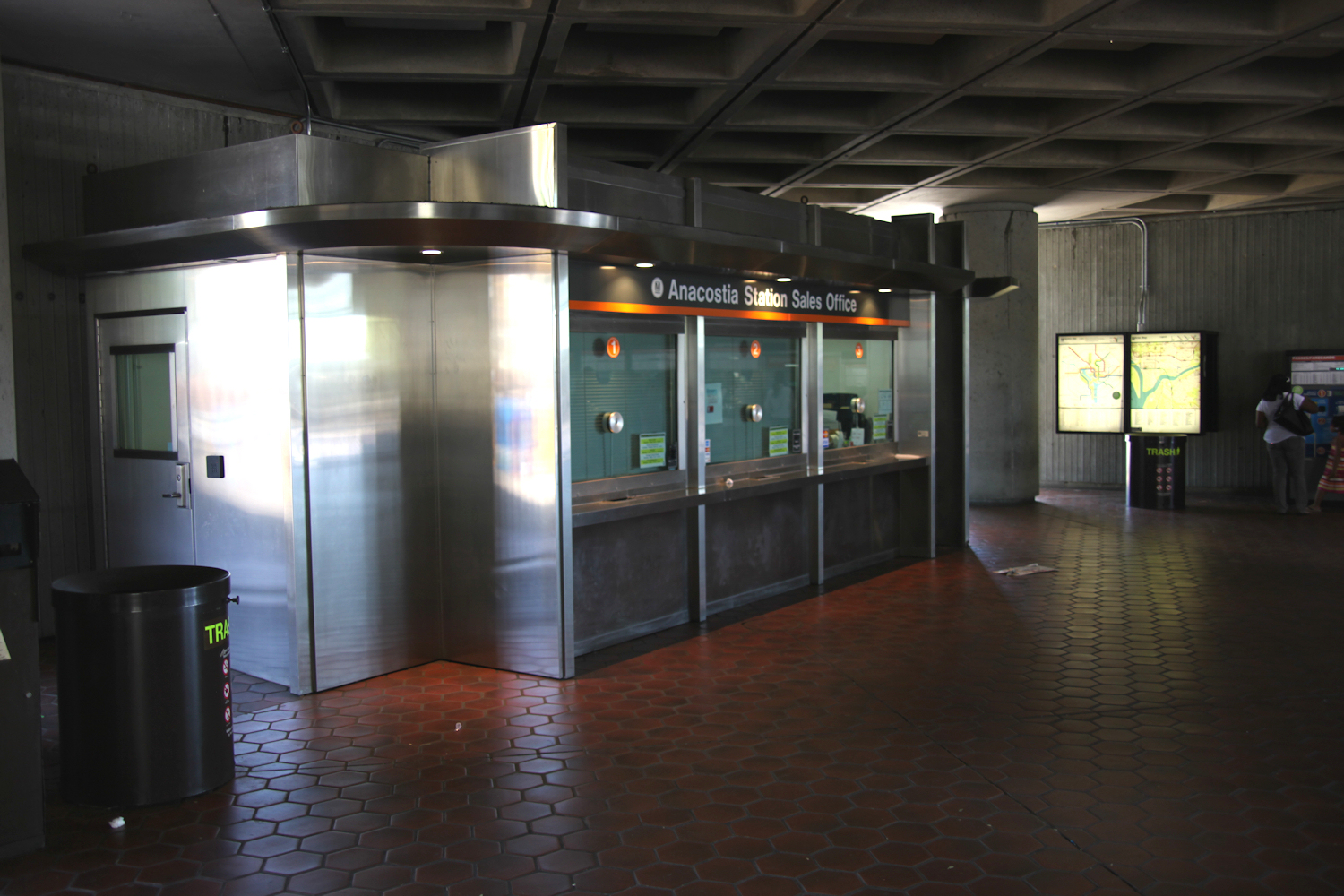
Sales offices inside the Anacostia Metro station on the Green Line (near the Howard Road SE exit).

The Anacostia station has had relatively few maintenance issues during its lifetime. In 1997, the station's escalators suffered repeated breakdown, as did escalators throughout the Metrorail system, due to poor maintenance.

Parking at the station was originally difficult to find, but availability has improved over time. By July 1997, the parking garage at the Anacostia station was usually full by 9 A.M. on a weekday. But after the Green Line's final five stations opened in January 2001, the parking garage at the Anacostia station became underused. Ten years into its operation, the parking garage required refurbishing, but Metro put the project off for a year to pay for other projects. The parking garage was one of 13 in the Metro system which had no waiting list for long-term parking as of February 2004. Its parking garage still did not fill up on workdays as of March 2005.

The station plays a key role in Metro operations. In October 1997, Metro announced that it would use sidings located near the Anacostia station for storing extra trains whenever major public events downtown (such as Capitals or Wizards games at the Capital One Arena) required extra train service.

==== Experiments ====
The Anacostia station has been used several times for experiments in improving Metrorail's operations. In July 1997, Anacostia was one of five Metrorail stations used to test a premium monthly parking fee which would guarantee the purchaser a spot at the station's parking garage. The $50-a-month pass was the most popular at Anacostia, and the pricing scheme was expanded throughout the Metro system in March 1998. Although Metro reserved on 15 percent of all spaces for such parking at most stations, at Anacostia this was raised to 25 percent. In March 1999, Metro tested a new emergency call box system at Anacostia and two other Metrorail stations. When Metro established a carsharing program with Flexcar in 2001, the Anacostia station was one of 12 Metrorail stations at which the system was tested. Metro also tested its "Next Bus" real-time information system (designed to let riders know how long they have to wait for the bus) at Anacostia and four other Metrorail stations. Technical problems and funding issues delayed implementation of the project on a wider scale. Metro relaunched the system in June 2009, and once more Metrobus "Next Bus" signs were activated at Anacostia and two other pilot Metrorail stations. When Metro announced a pilot program in the spring of 2006 to encourage food and other vendors to sell goods in Metrorail stations, Anacostia was one of 12 stations chosen for the test. The program stalled due to cleanliness, safety, and other concerns, but was reinvigorated in 2009, and Anacostia was one of three Metrorail stations chosen again to experiment with the initiative. When Metro adopted the SmarTrip fare care program the same year, Anacostia was one of three stations chosen to experiment with SmarTrip fare gate express lanes. The express lane program was canceled when too few riders used the express lanes. Anacostia was also one of six parking garages and lots where Metro experimented with accepting credit card payments rather than SmarTrip cards in 2007. Anacostia was also one of eight Metro stations which first sold SmarTrip cards in 2008.

==== Rail car shortage ====
Service at the Anacostia station and along the entire Green Line was hampered during the station's first decade by a severe shortage of rail cars. Metro first became aware of a rail car shortage in 1988 (at the time, there were only 666 railcars of 1000-, 2000-, and 3000- series rolling stock in the entire system; these comprised the entire system's fleet in 1988), but did little to resolve the issue.

Metro also encountered significant problems estimating the number of riders who would board the system at the Anacostia and other Green Line stations. In June 1991, WMATA estimated that just over 15,000 riders on average would board at the Waterfront, Navy Yard, and Anacostia stations. In December 1991, when the Anacostia Station opened, Metro had revised that number to 30,700 riders per day (by June 1992). Just a week later, Metro dropped that estimate to only 28,000 riders a day (by June 1992).

Even though significant numbers of bus riders in Anacostia had switched to Metrorail by February 1992, WMATA nonetheless began running two- rather than four-car trains on the Green Line on Sundays and during slow periods in order to close a revenue shortfall.

Metro finally ordered new 5000-series rail cars, but the first of the cars were not due to be delivered until February 2001.

The December 2000 opening of the final five Green Line stations (Branch Avenue, Suitland, Naylor Road, Southern Avenue, and Congress Heights) significantly worsened overcrowding and service problems on the Green Line. The five new stations added almost 20,000 new riders a day, overwhelming station platforms, jamming trains to capacity, and forcing many riders at Anacostia and other stations up the line to wait as train after train passed them filled. Metro had estimated that 18,000 riders a day would board from these stations by June 2001. That estimate was exceeded by 2,000 riders a day on the second day the stations were open.

By January 24, the number had risen to more than 30,600 per day—three times as many as originally estimated. Angry commuters using the Anacostia, Navy Yard, and Waterfront stations peppered the transit agency with complaints. Metro claimed a number of factors contributed to the ridership crunch: The system was experiencing record ridership; two-year-old ridership projections were used; the five stations were opened two months ahead of schedule, which was well before 192 new 5000-series rail cars were ready for service; and Metro offered free parking at the Green Line stations, which drew 12,000 riders, 300% of the expected 4,000, to the line.

== Crime ==
=== Early incidents ===
Since the 1980s, Anacostia has been long been synonymous with crime and violence, and has one of the highest crime rates in the District of Columbia (albeit not in all crimes). Concern about crime on the Green Line stations in southeast D.C. (Anacostia, Congress Heights, and Southern Avenue) have existed for a long time, although statistics only partially support these concerns.

The first reported incident of crime at the Anacostia station occurred during the station's construction. Three teenagers broke into the construction site on July 7, 1989; stole tools; and broke the glass on the cab of a crane before being arrested. Concern about crime at the station led Metro to station additional transit police officers at Anacostia station in the weeks after the station's opening, and D.C. police patrolled the station's parking garage. Fear of crime was one of the reasons why Prince George's County residents fought bus route changes in 1991 which would have forced riders to disembark at Anacostia station.

Concerns about crime at the station initially appeared justified. The first reported crime at Anacostia station occurred on February 5, 1992, just six weeks after the station opened. A man was accosted by three teenagers at about 9:25 P.M. at the station, kidnapped at gunpoint, and forced to strip naked. The youths took clothing, a watch, and $7 from him, and were caught by police while trying to flee the scene of the crime. In its first year of operation, Anacostia tied with the Capitol Heights station for the most auto thefts (17), and accounted for 11.3 percent of all auto thefts at Metrorail stations. By 2005, large crowds of middle and high school students began congregating at the station, brawling and robbing Metro riders and creating a public safety issue. In November 2005, Metro and the District of Columbia Public Schools entered into an agreement to bus students from Anacostia High School directly to the station rather than have them walk or take Metrobus to the station. Metro Transit Police officers, some accompanied by dogs, began patrolling Anacostia station along with six other Metro stations, to increase awareness of police presences in the stations and deter crime. The police presence did not appear to help: Between 2002 and 2006, arrests of juveniles on Metro increased to 295 from 156, and warnings increased 40 percent. Nearly half the arrests occurred at just five stations: Anacostia, Fort Totten, Gallery Place-Chinatown, L'Enfant Plaza, and Minnesota Avenue. Metro even created a special unit to focus on juvenile crime on Metro, and established liaisons at all D.C. public schools to feed intelligence and information about pending problems to Metro's police division.

=== Trends ===
Crime continued to be a problem at the Anacostia station late into the first decade of the 21st century. Assaults and shootings were more frequent at the station than at any other station in the transit system. There were 32 robberies at the station in 2007, and Metro Transit Police established a system-wide crime prevention and awareness program to help reduce crime. Although Anacostia was one of the ten Metro stations with the highest crime rate in 2007 (and the only such station on the list inside the District of Columbia), it had no auto thefts or break-ins. To help deter crime, Metro installed outdoor security cameras at the 10 high-crime Metrorail stations in July 2008. Metro Transit Police stepped up their visibility and presence even further in September 2008 at all stations with high student ridership, including Anacostia.

But crime on Metro as a whole was rising in the late 2000s. Historically, Metro has had a significantly lower crime rate than any comparable transit system in the United States. But crime on the transit system began spiking in 2008 and 2009. Robbery rose by 30 percent to 581 incidents in 2008, and in the first four months of 2009 rose another 28.3 percent to 240 robberies. But Anacostia was no longer the station with the most robberies; Gallery Place-Chinatown had 30 percent more robberies than Anacostia (the next-highest station was L'Enfant Plaza, with 20 percent fewer than Anacostia). Nonetheless, juvenile crime (assault and robbery) continued to be a serious issue for Metro, with more than 260 juvenile arrests in the first nine months of 2009 and Metro Transit Police continuing to engage in large numbers of high-visibility patrols. Anacostia, Fort Totten, Gallery Place-Chinatown, L'Enfant Plaza, and Minnesota Avenue continued to be trouble spots, and Metro added Metro Center to the list as well.

=== Notable crimes ===
Notable crimes committed at the Anacostia station include:

- February 5, 1992: A man was accosted by three teenagers at about 9:25 P.M., kidnapped at gunpoint, and forced to strip naked on a nearby street. The youths took clothing, a watch, and $7 from him, and were caught by police while trying to flee the scene of the crime.
- March 30, 2004: Two men began arguing inside the Anacostia station. One of the men, 29-year-old Bradley Gant, boarded an idling Metrobus. The other man opened fire on the bus with a handgun, shooting Gant in the chest and killing him. The assailant fled and has not been captured as of December 2009.
- November 17, 2007: 25-year-old Timothy Spicer was carjacked at about 9:10 P.M. near the entrance to the Anacostia station parking garage. He was shot multiple times, pushed from his vehicle, and died a few hours later. In February 2018, Maurice Blakey pled guilty to second degree murder while armed for shooting Mr. Spicer in the back, and was sentenced to a 22 year prison term. Mr. Blakey had two look-outs, Joseph Minor and Randolph Williams. Mr. Minor pled guilty to voluntary manslaughter while armed and was sentenced to 8.5 years to run consecutively to a 47 year prison term he is serving for another murder. Mr. Williams pled guilty to second degree murder. Kadeem Quarles was sentenced to 16 years in prison for his role in the murder of Mr. Spicer in October 2018.
- June 18, 2008: A Metrobus driver received a gunshot wound to the head at 12:45 P.M. from a stray bullet during a shootout between two teenagers near the Anacostia station. Both juveniles were also wounded. D.C. police arrested both youths inside the station.
- February 15, 2009: A teenager was shot and wounded inside the Anacostia station at about 12:20 A.M. The teen was allegedly part of a group which boarded the Green Line at the Gallery Place-Chinatown Station. A dispute with another group of teens and young adults broke out. The victim left the train at the Anacostia station, and was shot on the platform. Two Metro Transit Police officers gave chase and captured the alleged assailant (an adult).

== Economic development ==
Metrorail has often been viewed as an important factor in spurring economic development in the D.C. metropolitan region.

However, the Green Line has brought relatively minimal economic development to the area around the Anacostia station As of December 2009.

=== Early history ===
The Anacostia area of the District of Columbia is one of the most economically depressed regions of the city, and has been since the 1960s. As early as 1981, consultants and studies were predicting that the Anacostia station would spark a similar economic revival in Anacostia. But little real estate speculation in the area had occurred as of mid-1982. To help spur development, the D.C. City Council adopted a comprehensive land-use policy in 1985 (the city's first), and identified the area around the planned Anacostia station at Howard Road SE as a proposed regional shopping center and designated it a "development opportunity area". In 1988, the D.C. City Council designated the entire Anacostia area an Economic Development Zone, giving tax and other incentives to developers who constructed buildings or established businesses in the area. A wave of federal and city housing subsidies poured into the area in 1989 as the opening of the station neared, leading to the renovation of about 3,500 housing units (homes and apartments) and a rise in the price of land (to $55 per square foot from $2 per square foot, an increase of 2,650 percent) around the station. Many residents and businesses in the area resisted development which was out of character with the Anacostia Historic District, and feared the loss of the area's identity. However, at least one study by a professor of urban and regional planning at George Washington University found that the historic district designation had done little to spur economic growth in the neighborhood. These fears were supported by Dorn McGrath, Jr., director of the George Washington University Institute for Urban Development Research, who says that new Metro stations attracted high-income residents who gentrified their areas, drove rents up, and caused neighborhoods to lose their identity.

=== Opening ===
As the Anacostia station opened, little development had occurred, however. The closest businesses (hair salons, carry-out fast food stores, auto repair and tire shops) were three blocks away, and no plans for retail development had been submitted despite the city's action six years earlier. Nonetheless, McGrath and the nonprofit Anacostia Economic Development Corp. both believed new restaurants, new service businesses, and housing redevelopment were coming quickly.

These hopes initially seemed justified. As property assessments in D.C. fell an average of 0.3 percent, assessments near the Anacostia station rose 4.1 percent in 1992 and 9.7 percent in 1993. In mid-1993, the District of Columbia rezoned 11 acres (45,000 m^{2}) of vacant land (bounded by South Capitol Street, Anacostia Drive SE, and Howard Road SE) known as Poplar Point for mixed-use retail, office and residential use rather than industrial use in order to spur economic development. Dr. McGrath and others warned that the city was moving too fast and allowing economic development to get out of control.

=== Late 1990s ===
But by 1997, almost no economic development around the Anacostia station had occurred despite the Economic Development Zone incentives or existence of the new Metro station. In 1999, D.C. Mayor Anthony A. Williams again made development of Poplar Point a major focus of the District government. The Oliver Carr Co., a major D.C. area real estate developer, offered to build the D.C. Department of Employment Services a new headquarters next to the Anacostia Metro station if the government would sell the company its building at 6th Street NW and Pennsylvania Avenue NW, but the offer was not accepted. In 2001, the National Capital Planning Commission produced a master plan for the city's memorials and monuments which suggested that Anacostia (including the Anacostia Metro station) become a hub for new memorials.

Another five years passed, and still Metro and the District of Columbia were trying to find builders who would develop land around the Anacostia station. Although the District of Columbia was building two office buildings at Martin Luther King, Jr. Avenue and Good Hope Road (the Anacostia Professional Building at 2041 Martin Luther King, Jr. Avenue SE and the Anacostia Gateway building at 1800 Martin Luther King, Jr. Avenue SE), Metro was still unable to find developers willing to respond to its call for economic improvement next to the Anacostia station.

=== Early 2000s ===
In 2005, D.C. Mayor Williams proposed Metro move its headquarters to a site near the Anacostia station, setting off a years-long controversy. Williams promised to relocate 200,000 square feet (19,000 m^{2}) of city offices and the headquarters of the Anacostia Waterfront Corporation to the building to ensure high occupancy rates. Williams said Metro could then sell its downtown eight-story office building and land at 5th and F Streets NW for $75 million, which would help the transit agency fund projects as well as the move. City officials and Anacostia residents said that the move would spur economic growth in the area, although private-sector developers said that was not clear. Although the D.C. City Council passed legislation requiring Metro to locate in Anacostia (if it moved), Metro officials were skeptical that the move would be cost-effective.

After a year without any movement on the proposal, the Anacostia Waterfront Corp. proposed a more detailed, even larger development that included 750,000 square feet (70,000 m^{2}) of office space, apartments and condos, and retail space. The AWC also proposed building another 180,000 square feet (17,000 m^{2}) of office and residential space by constructing a building above the Anacostia station's bus bays. D.C. representatives on Metro's board of directors pushed the agency to accept the proposal in April 2007. But by November 2007, no decision had been made. In September 2008, D.C. Deputy Mayor for Economic Development Neil Albert joined Metro's board of directors in a move many observers interpreted as an attempt to persuade Metro to move to the Anacostia station. D.C. City Council members criticized Virginia's representatives on the Metro board for not doing more to support the move, and threatened to withhold approval for the Silver Line to Ashburn Station and Dulles International Airport Station. The District backed down from the threat after an independent consultant's report for Metro found that the move would cost the transit agency $70 million. Nonetheless, D.C. Mayor Adrian Fenty (who took office in 2007) said moving Metro's headquarters to the Anacostia station remained the "highest priority of our administration".

=== Criticism ===
Metro's efforts to develop the land at the Anacostia station have been strongly criticized. When Metro began operations in 1976, the transit agency created the Joint Development Program cooperatively promote retail, office, and residential development on land owned by Metro, by state or local governments, or private owners in order to boost bus and rail ridership on the system, generate operating income for Metro, and help state and local governments see a return on their investment in Metro (through revenues or increases in tax assessments). By 2007, Metro had signed 56 joint development projects generating $129 million (over 30 years) in income. At least one study showed that Metro-sponsored developments significantly outperformed developments built solely by the private sector. Nonetheless, Metro was only generating a rather small $4.3 million a year from its joint development projects, and anecdotal evidence indicated that Metro had a very mixed history in actually bringing development online.

=== Current status ===
In 2006, Metro's Interim General Manager, Dan Tangherlini, established a task force composed of experts in land use and economic development to study Metro's efforts to develop land around its Metrorail stations. Delivered in September 2007, the report found that Metro managers focused on running the system day-to-day and opening new stations and lines rather than pushing income-generating development at existing stations; Metro staff were either apathetic to and "sometimes obstructionist" regarding development planning (particularly regarding stations in Anacostia and Prince George's County); Metro had alienated developers and residents, subjected plans to "interminable reviews", ignored community concerns, and rarely coordinated with local or state government. Although a quarter of Metro's stations had property available for development (most of them in Anacostia and Prince George's County), Metro had done little to develop them. "Metro has been totally ineffective and counterproductive to any decent development at Metro stations," the task force chairman said. The report concluded that Metro had actually hindered development near Metrorail stations. Dozens of proposals had been stymied, and development proposals had dropped to an extremely low 2.1 per station per year. Although the report said the problem was urgent, Metro's board of directors repeatedly postponed discussion of the report for at least seven months.

The last publicly reported development proposal at the Anacostia station came in September 2008. Urban-City Ventures LLC announced it had purchased 200,000 square feet (19,000 m^{2}) of land along both sides of Howard Road SE just west Anacostia Metro station and planned to build a big-box store there (although the retailer was not announced). Meanwhile, Clark Realty Capital LLC and the District of Columbia were petitioning the federal government to transfer 110 acres (45 ha) of federally owned land at Poplar Point to build office buildings.
