= Martin Luther King Jr. Avenue =

Street in District of Columbia, USA

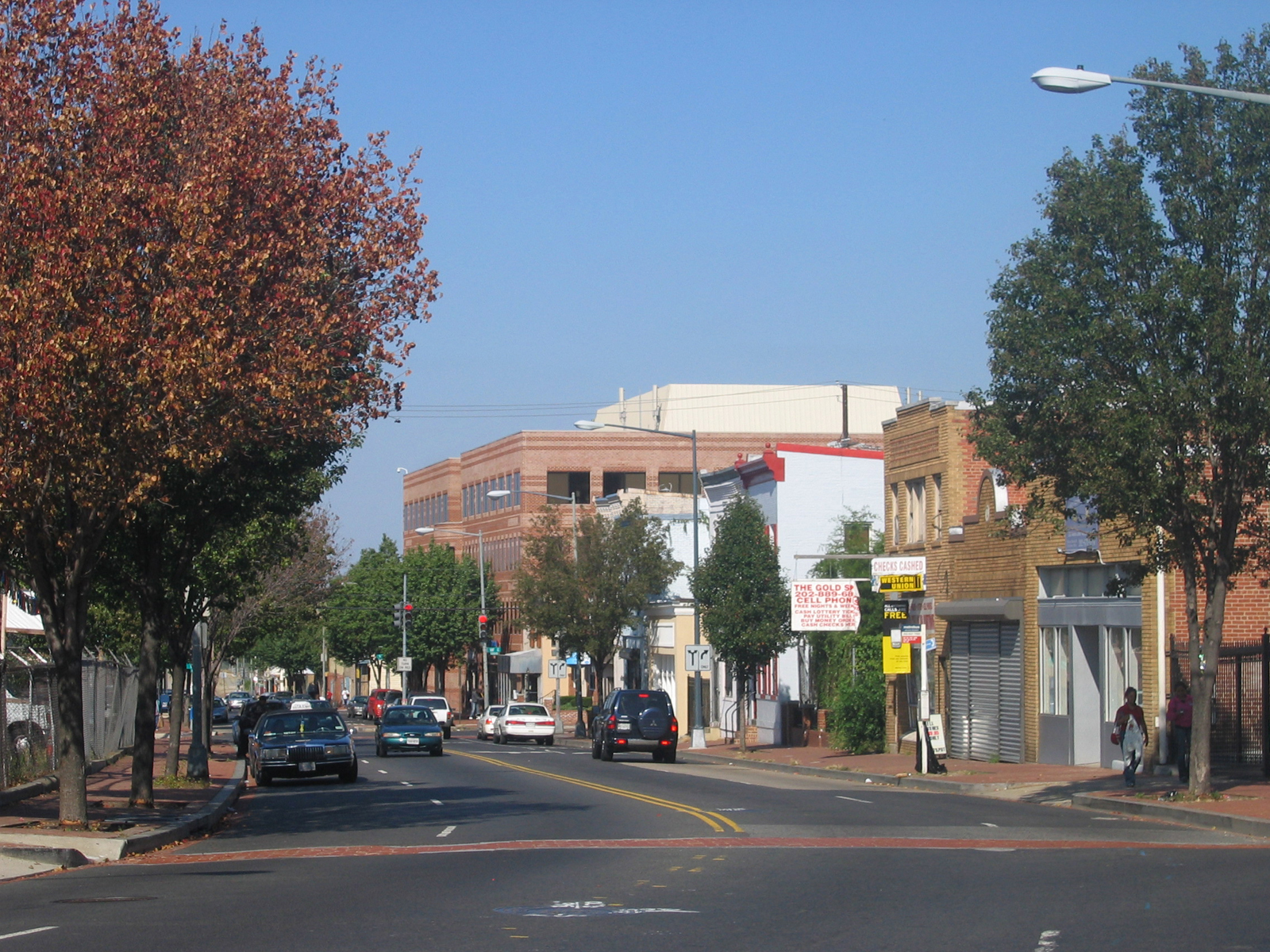
Looking south on Martin Luther King Jr. Avenue SE in Washington, D.C.

Martin Luther King Jr. Avenue (shortened as MLK Ave) is a major street in the District of Columbia, United States, traversing through both the Southwest and Southeast quadrants of the district.

== Route ==
Martin Luther King Jr. Avenue SW begins at the southwestern tip of the District of Columbia near the Blue Plains Advanced Wastewater Treatment Plant. Headed north, the avenue overlaps with South Capitol Street from 2nd St SW to Halley Place SE, where it turns northeast, becoming Martin Luther King Jr. Avenue SE. As it crosses through the Congress Heights neighborhood, MLK Ave changes from a primarily residential neighborhood to a commercial district.

Also in the Congress Heights area, MLK Ave crosses both Alabama Avenue SE and Malcolm X Ave S (Portland Street). After leaving Congress Heights, the street turns north, crossing throughout the campus of St. Elizabeths Hospital, the future home of the Department of Homeland Security. MLK Ave stays headed north, crossing the Suitland Parkway before reaching the Anacostia Metro Station. After passing the Anacostia Station, MLK Ave enters historic Anacostia, crossing Good Hope Road before terminating at the 11th Street Bridges.

== History ==
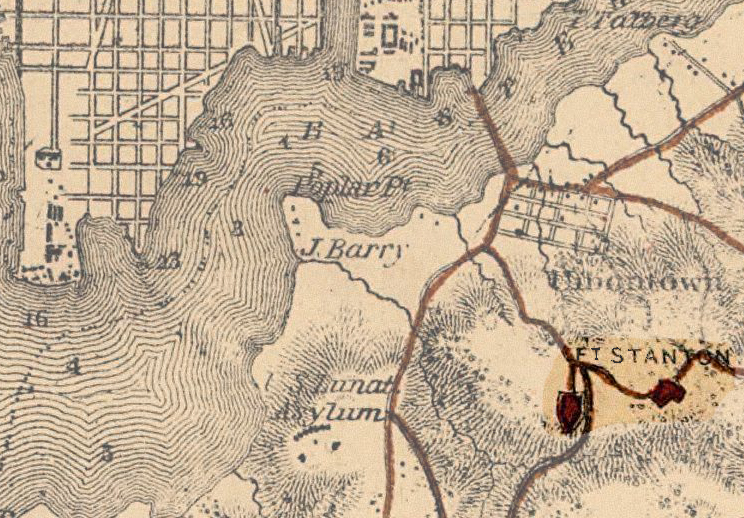
1865 map of the Anacostia area of Washington, D.C., showing "Asylum Avenue" passing south by the Hospital for the Insane.

Martin Luther King Jr. Avenue was originally constructed in 1855 as Asylum Avenue, when the Government Hospital for the Insane (later known as St. Elizabeths Hospital) was built on the "St. Elizabeth's tract" in the District of Columbia. It was renamed Nichols Avenue in 1879, in honor of St. Elizabeths Hospital Superintendent Charles Henry Nichols. It was renamed again for slain civil rights leader Martin Luther King Jr. on January 15, 1971.

In 2003, the District of Columbia Department of Transportation (DDOT) announced that, as part of its DC Streetcar system, it would build a 2.7 miles (4.3 km) "Anacostia Line" as a demonstration of streetcar technology in the city. The line was planned to begin at Bolling Air Force Base, travel up north along South Capitol Street to the Anacostia Metro station, along Martin Luther King Jr. Avenue SE to Good Hope Road SE, and then along the CSX railroad tracks to the Minnesota Avenue Metro station. However, in October 2010 the city scaled back the Anacostia Line, truncating the northern end of the line so that it would only end at the Anacostia Metro station.

On March 4, 2011, DDOT announced public meetings designed to provide a link between the Anacostia Metro Station and the 11th Street Bridges (under construction as of early 2011) which would meet community concerns about traffic impacts the streetcar would have on MLK Ave, threats to historic preservation in the Anacostia Historic District, and terminating the line at the Anacostia Gateway building at the intersection of MLK Ave and Good Hope Road SE. The 11th Street Bridges are designed to carry streetcars over the Anacostia River, permitting the Anacostia Line to link with the rest of the streetcar system.

== Transportation ==
The Anacostia Metrorail Station lies on Howard Road Southeast, just off of MLK Avenue.

- Anacostia Station
  Green Line

Metrobus lines A2, A4, A5, A6, A7, A8, A9, A33, B2, P6, V2, W2, W3, W6, W8, 90, and 92 serve MLK Ave

For more information, see List of Metrobus routes

== See also ==
- List of streets named after Martin Luther King, Jr.

== Bibliography ==
- Benedetto, Robert; Du Vall, Kathleen; Donovan, Jane (2001). Historical Dictionary of Washington, D.C. Lanham, Md.: Scarecrow Press. ISBN 9780810840942.
- Evelyn, Douglas E.; Dickson, Paul; Ackerman, S.J. (2008). On This Spot: Pinpointing the Past in Washington, D.C. Sterling, Va.: Capital Books. ISBN 9781933102702.
