= Anacostia Waterfront Corporation =

Defunct government-owned corporation in the United States

- Anacostia Waterfront Corporation logo in 2006
- Type: Government-owned corporation
- Founded: Washington, D.C., U.S. (August 5, 2004)
- Defunct: July 19, 2007
- Fate: Dissolved
- Successor: Office of the Deputy Mayor for Planning and Economic Development, Government of the District of Columbia

The Anacostia Waterfront Corporation (AWC) was a government-owned corporation established in 2004 by the government of District of Columbia, in the United States, to revitalize neighborhoods next to the Anacostia River and to coordinate the environmental rehabilitation and use of the river. The corporation was intended to have a 20-year lifespan, during which it would oversee an $8 billion public-private redevelopment plan covering the Anacostia River waterfront and numerous parcels of land in the city east of the river. However, a change in mayoral administrations and frustration with the slow pace of redevelopment resulted in the abolition of the corporation after three years.

== Formation ==
In December 2003, D.C. Mayor Anthony A. Williams proposed creating a government-owned corporation, the Anacostia Waterfront Corporation, to promote redevelopment of the neighborhoods, roads, parks, and other areas adjacent to the Anacostia River. The proposal was the culmination of a more than four-year effort by city and federal officials, developers, private organizations, and citizens. The proposed corporation was modeled after the Battery Park City Authority, which oversaw the redevelopment of Battery Park and the residential Battery Park City neighborhood in New York City.

The AWC would be funded by $250 million in revenue bonds and implement a 20-year program that would raise $8 billion in public and private funds (including $1.5 billion cleanup of the river). The plan called for 5,000 new residences (both new homes and apartments), new retail districts, office buildings, a riverwalk, new bridges and roads, and a light rail transportation line to be built in the area by 2011. The Council of the District of Columbia approved the legislation on July 13, 2004, and Mayor Williams signed it into law on August 5, 2004.

The chairman of the AWC's board of directors was Stephen Goldsmith, a former mayor of Indianapolis, Indiana, and its chief executive officer was Andrew Altman, Director of the Office of Planning for the District of Columbia.

== Activities ==
=== Baseball District ===
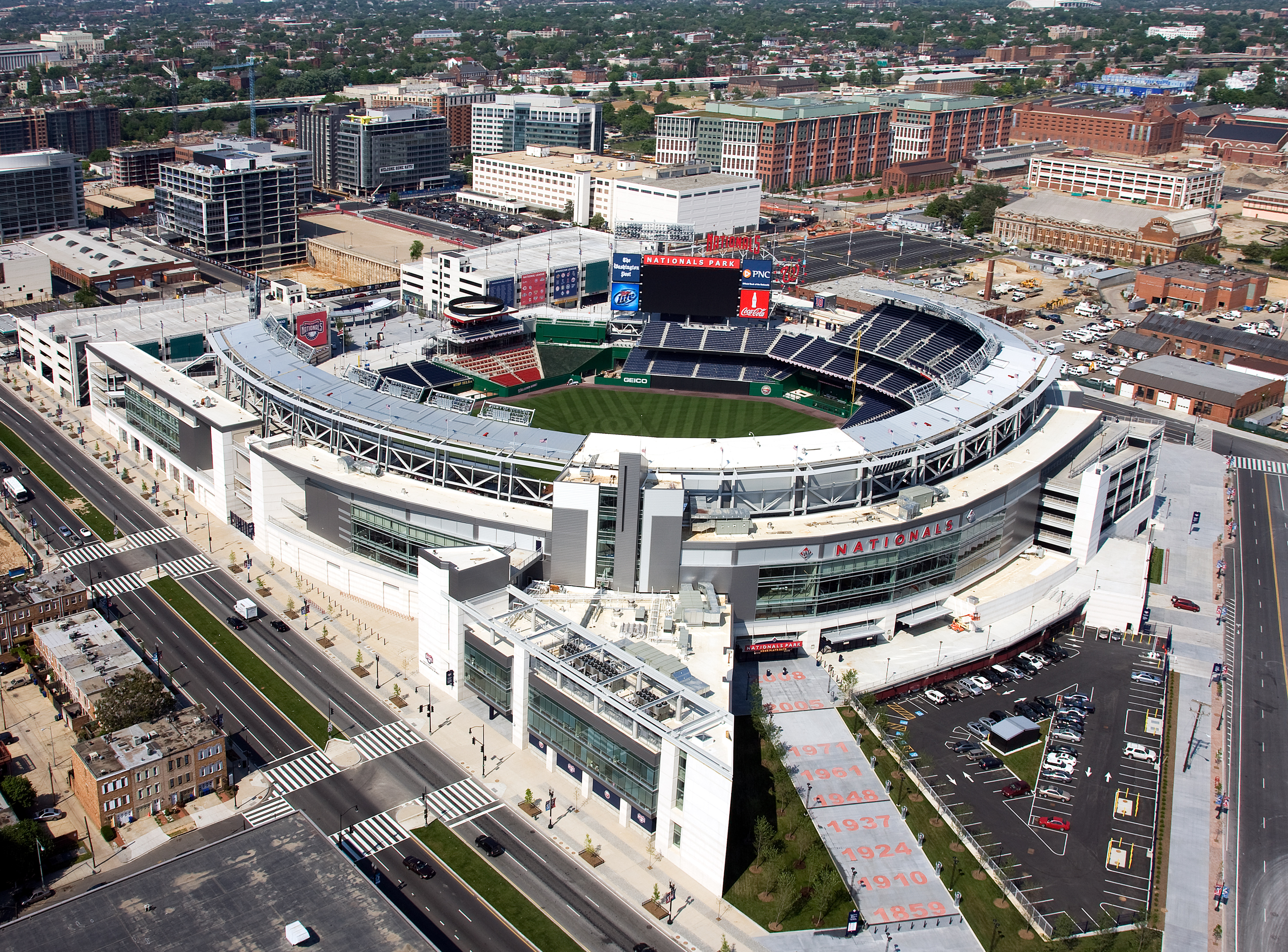
Nationals Park, with completed and under-construction buildings of the Baseball District in the background.

The AWC was a proponent of building Nationals Park, a new baseball stadium, to be the home field of the Washington Nationals Major League Baseball team. The stadium quickly became AWC's biggest redevelopment project, which the corporation called the "Baseball District." The AWC began negotiating in August 2005 to buy land near the ballpark to spur development and turn the area around the stadium into an attraction similar to the area around the Verizon Center in Chinatown. A 40 acres (16 ha) site with hotels, office space, parks, residential housing, retail shops, and restaurants was envisioned. As part of its development effort, the AWC feuded publicly with the D.C. Sports and Entertainment Commission, calling for underground rather than surface parking. The Washington Nationals' ownership also demanded above-ground parking. A deal was struck in June 2006 to build both parking garages above-ground and surround them with high-rise condominium buildings so they would not be eyesores. When the deal collapsed three months later, the AWC tried to buy the land for $1 million.

In December 2005, the AWC named two master planning teams to help oversee the design of the Baseball District. When the cost of building the stadium soared by 25 percent to $667 million, the AWC was asked to sell development rights on its land adjacent to the stadium to cover the cost overruns. By June 2006, feuding over the development had resulted in Mayor Williams' creating an Office of Baseball on his staff to oversee the development of the Ballpark District. A draft master plan was released in late June 2006.

=== Southwest waterfront ===
A second major initiative was the Southwest waterfront development — a mile-long tract bordered by 12th Street SW, M Street SW, Maine Avenue SW, and the Anacostia River. The proposed development was the first revitalization effort in the area since the mid-1960s. But the property was controlled by the National Capital Revitalization Corporation (NCRC), another quasi-government corporation established by the D.C. government. In February 2006, the NCRC agreed to give the waterfront property to the AWC in exchange for $25 million, $24.5 million in city-owned land, and the right to develop three other large city-owned parcels of land.

The AWC asked for proposals that included "cultural space" (such as a museum, musical performance space, or theatre), a hotel, office space, parking, residential housing, and retail space. Seventeen companies responded with proposals. Five were chosen in June 2006 by the AWC to submit more detailed proposals, and two selected to submit final proposals two months later. PN Hoffman/Struever Bros. Eccles & Rouse was chosen in September 2006 to be the lead developer. But the development proposals were stalled because the transaction had still not been formalized two years after AWC and NRCR agreed to the land swap. The D.C. City Council attempted to pass legislation in November 2006 to force the land swap through, and the AWC offered to buy out leaseholders for $20 million to encourage NCRC to turn over the land. The transfer finally occurred in mid-February 2007.

=== Other projects ===
Other AWC development projects included:

- Anacostia Metro Station — The AWC proposed in August 2005 to build its corporate headquarters at the Anacostia Metro station to promote development in the blighted neighborhood of Anacostia. No further action was taken until November 2006, when the AWC asked Metro's Board of Directors to move the transit agency's headquarters from downtown D.C. to a new, $65 million building to be constructed on top of the Anacostia Metro station.
- Barry Farm and Lincoln Heights — The AWC also held title to two parcels of land, one in the impoverished Barry Farm neighborhood near Poplar Point and the other in Lincoln Heights near the far eastern corner of the District of Columbia. The District of Columbia agreed in December 2006 to issue $350 million in municipal bonds to help build 1,400 residential housing units in both areas on AWC-controlled land.
- Hill East/Reservation 13 waterfront — The AWC was the lead agency to redevelop the public land known as Hill East, which consisted of L'Enfant Plan Reservation 13, a section of the city bounded by the Anacostia River, 17th Street SE, and Potomac Avenue SE. The corporation made 14 cash grants to community development groups to encourage them to provide greater use of this waterfront section. In June 2006, the AWC released plans to extend Massachusetts Avenue SE into Hill East, build 2,000 units of residential housing and 1,000,000 square feet (93,000 m^{2}) of office space across the river in the Kenilworth neighborhood, and construct a pedestrian bridge across Kenilworth Avenue to the Deanwood Metro station (to connect the residential development to the subway). A year after President George W. Bush proposed transferring the land to the AWC, the corporation had done little to effect the land transfer. The AWC began pushing federal legislation to transfer the site in mid-2006. Still, the federal government refused to hand over the land until the city found a site for a congressional mail-sorting facility located at Hill East. Despite the lack of title to the land, the AWC hired two engineering teams to plan for infrastructure improvements and to begin laying out a medical office complex, a mixed-use residential development, an office park, and a replacement for the D.C. Jail. In March 2007, the AWC unveiled six draft designs for the Kenilworth Avenue pedestrian bridge.
- Kingman and Heritage Islands — Mayor Williams also proposed transferring Kingman Island and nearby Heritage Island in the Anacostia River to the AWC for development as parks and for constructing bird and wildlife education centers.
- Poplar Point — This 110 acres (45 ha) parcel of land is bordered by the Anacostia River, South Capitol Street, Interstate 295 (also known as the Anacostia Freeway), and the 11th Street Bridges, and is part of Anacostia Park. Although only the federal government held title to Poplar Point, the AWC assumed it would eventually gain control of the area and issued a request for design proposals that would include parks, memorials, and residential housing while maintaining at least part of the area's wetlands. A master planning exercise began in June 2006. A year after President George W. Bush proposed transferring the land to the AWC, the corporation had done little to effect the land transfer, and AWC officials had still not agreed on redevelopment plans. In November 2006, the AWC said it was delaying the development of Poplar Point until the federal government replaced the Frederick Douglass Memorial Bridge. The AWC released a master plan for Poplar Point in January 2007 that included a 27,000-seat soccer stadium, a hotel, a conference center, 2,000 residential housing units, and a park.
- Washington Canal Park - AWC planned to create a park-like area along 2nd Street SE between M and I Streets SE, which would provide space for the construction of residential housing, office and retail space, and public parks. The AWC hoped to break ground on Washington Canal Park in early 2007.

By June 2007, however, the AWC had not broken ground on any redevelopment project.

The AWC's chief executive officer, Andrew Altman, resigned on October 6, 2005. He was replaced by a local developer, Adrian G. Washington, on November 11, 2005. A month after his appointment, Washington approved the creation of an advisory council to help oversee the AWC's redevelopment efforts.

=== Bond sales ===
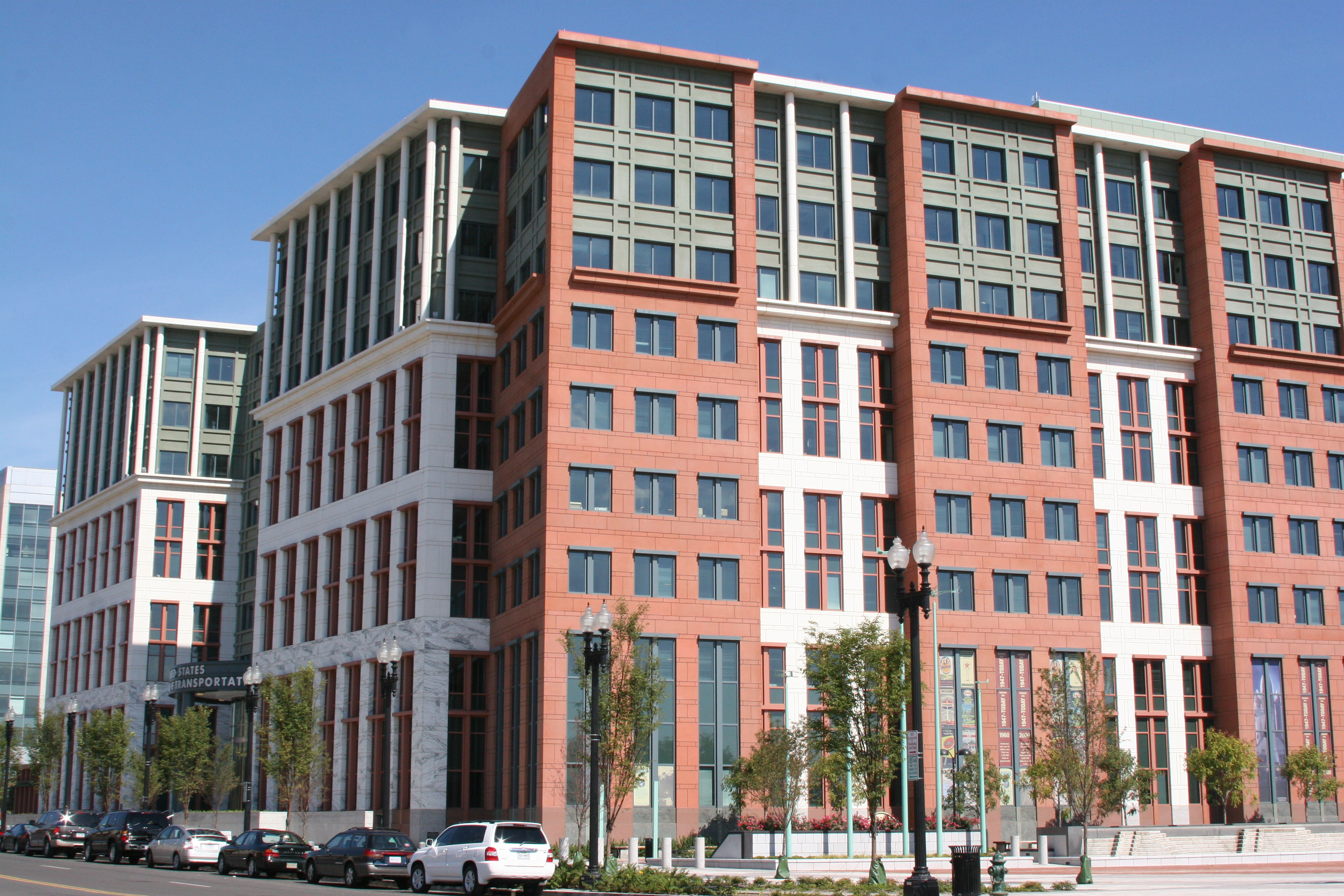
The U.S. Department of Transportation headquarters, which opened in 2007, is the centerpiece of Federal Center Southeast.

Several bond sales funded AWC's initial development efforts. Mayor Williams first proposed a $230 million "payment in lieu of taxes" (or PILOT) bond financing plan in June 2006. The bond sale was expected to generate about $75 million for the AWC, which would use the money to make infrastructure improvements at Hill East, Poplar Point, and the Southwest waterfront. Another $140 million of the PILOT bonds would fund infrastructure improvements around the new United States Department of Transportation headquarters (then being built at 1200 New Jersey Avenue SE, near the Navy Yard – Ballpark Metro station) and within the Federal Center Southeast. In November 2006, the AWC said it would offer a second bond issue to raise $100 million to make infrastructure improvements at and remove trash from Hill East/Reservation 13 and Poplar Point. The AWC said it would receive a share of a September 2006 sale of $248 million in Tobacco Master Settlement Agreement bonds to build a $60 million medical office building complex at Hill East. The city sold $140 million in PILOT bonds to build a $40 million park along the Anacostia River between South Capitol Street and 2nd Street SE and to fund $75 million in miscellaneous AWC projects. Another $90 million in PILOT bonds went on sale in February 2007 to help pay for infrastructure improvements at Federal Center Southeast.

=== Anacostia River cleanup and training efforts ===
The AWC also acted on its mission to assist in cleaning up the Anacostia River. In November 2006, the corporation prioritized river cleanup, which included watershed-wide education efforts to address non-point-source water pollution. The corporation announced strict environmental standards for its developers in February 2007 to help reduce wastewater runoff into the river. The AWC's efforts to develop site-specific environmental design guidelines won awards from the National Capital Section of the American Society of Civil Engineers and GreenHOME (an organization that recommends environmentally safe products for residential homes).

One of the AWC's final projects was funding a worker training center. Since its inception, the corporation had required that 51 percent of each developer's workforce come from the District of Columbia and that at least 10 percent of the workforce be residents of the city's impoverished Ward 8. But developers complained that few D.C. residents were prepared or trained for the jobs offered. The AWC established an employment organization to help screen D.C. residents who applied for jobs, better match residents to positions they qualified for, and improve their job skills to prepare them for the workplace. The organization would also help promote awareness of AWC redevelopment projects and job opportunities at those projects among Ward 7 and Ward 8 residents. This organization, the Business Resource Center, opened at 2311 Martin Luther King Jr. Avenue SE on April 11, 2007.

== Disbandment ==
Dissatisfaction with the AWC had been reported in August 2006. Community activists then called for the AWC to seek greater community input on its redevelopment plans—one member of the D.C. City Council began drafting a bill to require the AWC to be more transparent in its decision-making and operations.

D.C. Mayor Anthony Williams declined to seek re-election in 2006, and Adrian Fenty was elected as the new mayor. As part of his key initiatives in his first 100 days, Mayor Fenty announced the formation of a task force to assess whether the AWC and NCRC should be restructured or abolished. Days later, D.C. Council member Jack Evans, who had originally helped pass the bill to create the AWC, introduced legislation to abolish both corporations and transfer their authority and duties to the Office of the Deputy Mayor for Planning and Economic Development. Councilmember Kwame R. Brown, chair of the Council's Committee on Economic Development, held hearings on the bill in late January, during which the AWC received both praise and criticism.

The AWC's chief executive officer, Adrian Washington, resigned suddenly on February 12, 2007. Deputy Mayor for Planning and Economic Development Neil O. Albert was appointed interim CEO in his place.

Hearings on the Evans legislation continued in March 2007. Testimony increasingly addressed the lengthy delays in transferring land between the NCRC and AWC. Albert suggested five alternatives (ranging from keeping the status quo to merging the two organizations to disbanding both companies) for the City Council to consider, but his proposals were not well received. Some neighborhood groups supported the AWC and NCRC, arguing that the two corporations needed improvement but did not warrant disbandment. AWC supporters also noted that the agency was confronted with a patchwork of zoning laws, few assets, and strict requirements for affordable housing that made progress difficult and slow. They said the corporation should not be blamed for these problems. Councilmember Kwame Brown proposed creating a new "D.C. Economic Development Authority" to take over the duties of the two corporations, which would save $2.4 million in salaries alone. Fenty and Albert opposed Brown's proposal, arguing that the mayor's office should fully control redevelopment projects and that creating another bureaucracy was unnecessary. On May 15, the City Council attached the Brown bill to another piece of legislation and unanimously passed it in a parliamentary maneuver. But after Brown met with Mayor Fenty several times over the next three weeks, Brown relented. The City Council unanimously passed the Evans version of the legislation on June 5, 2007. Mayor Fenty signed the legislation into law on July 19, 2007. The final legislation required the city to assume all assets and debts of the two companies, and their consolidation with the Deputy Mayor's office had to be complete by October 1, 2007.

=== Later developments ===
Some council members were concerned that the Office of the Deputy Mayor for Planning and Economic Development could not implement a $10 billion redevelopment program. Others were concerned that the AWC may not have fully accounted for all its assets and debts; Kwame Brown asked the D.C. inspector general's office to audit the company before the October 1 deadline. By early December 2007, City Council members demanded greatly expanded oversight over the Deputy Mayor's office, and Albert strongly resisted such efforts. By April 2008, the City Council was imposing audits on the Deputy Mayor's office and the redevelopment projects it was overseeing.

On September 23, 2007, the city said consolidation of the AWC and NCRC with the Deputy Major's office would save the city $5.6 million annually in salaries and administrative costs alone. The city offered jobs to only 20 of the AWC's 31 employees. The merger was complete by the legislative deadline.

On July 23, 2007, just four days after the legislation disbanding the corporation was signed into law, the Deputy Mayor's office issued a plan for the redevelopment of Poplar Point that did not include a new soccer stadium—an apparent rejection of a major AWC proposal.

On January 16, 2008, the Deputy Mayor's office announced it was moving ahead with plans to build on the Southwest waterfront. About 18 percent of the $1.1 billion project would be funded by the Office of the Deputy Mayor for Planning and Economic Development. The city is estimated to collect $32 million in tax revenue annually from the project (an increase of $22 million from the 2006 level), and 2,880 jobs would be created.

== Bibliography ==
- Ackerman, Andrew. "Change Rules in D.C." The Bond Buyer. January 4, 2007.
- Ackerman, Andrew. "D.C. Agency Plans to Issue Bonds to Redevelop Two Pieces of Land." The Bond Buyer. November 20, 2006.
- Ackerman, Andrew. "D.C. Council Approves Redevelopment Projects, Rejects Mayor's Library Plan." The Bond Buyer. December 7, 2006.
- Ackerman, Andrew. "D.C. Eyes Anacostia River Revival." The Bond Buyer. December 4, 2006.
- Ackerman, Andrew. "D.C. Mayor to Take On Development Agencies." The Bond Buyer. January 12, 2007.
- Ackerman, Andrew. "D.C. Officials Approve $230M of Redevelopment PILOT Debt." The Bond Buyer. June 8, 2006.
- Ackerman, Andrew. "D.C. Redevelopment Agency Plans to Sell $230M of PILOTs." The Bond Buyer. February 26, 2007.
- Adler, Neil. "Deputy Mayor Appointed Interim Head of AWC." Washington Business Journal. February 20, 2007.
- "Anacostia Business Resource Center Opens." Roll Call. April 12, 2007.
- "Anacostia Corp. Focuses On Poplar Point Revamp." Roll Call. March 27, 2006.
- "AWC to Showcase Parkside Bridge Design Proposals." Roll Call. March 7, 2007.
- Brotherton, Elizabeth. "Anacostia Corp. Charts Future Course." Roll Call. December 12, 2005.
- Brotherton, Elizabeth. "Anacostia Corp. Hires New Head." Roll Call. November 16, 2005.
- Brotherton, Elizabeth. "Anacostia Progress Report." Roll Call. June 26, 2006.
- Brotherton, Elizabeth. "Anacostia River Gets Low Score on Health Report." Roll Call. November 2, 2006.
- Brotherton, Elizabeth. "Progress on the Riverfront." Roll Call. October 19, 2005.
- "City Plans Corporation to Manage Anacostia Project." Roll Call. December 8, 2003.
- Coombs, Joe. "After Two Years, D.C. Agencies Complete Land Swap to Spur Anacostia Development." Washington Business Journal. February 15, 2007.
- Coombs, Joe. "Agencies at Risk." Washington Business Journal. March 5, 2007.
- Coombs, Joe. "Anacostia Waterfront's CEO Jumps Ship." Washington Business Journal. February 13, 2007.
- Coombs, Joe. "AWC, NCRC to Be Part of Deputy Mayor's Office." Washington Business Journal. June 5, 2007.
- Coombs, Joe. "Deputy Mayor Ready to Take Control of NCRC, AWC." Washington Business Journal. May 14, 2007.
- Coombs, Joe. "Development Agencies Fated for Major Shake-Up." Washington Business Journal. March 19, 2007.
- Coombs, Joe. "Job Cuts to Come as Part of NCRC, AWC Fold-Up." Washington Business Journal. July 16, 2007.
- Coombs, Joe. "Neighborhood Groups Ask D.C. Council to Save Controversial Development Agencies." Washington Business Journal. March 13, 2007.
- "Deputy Mayor Heads Anacostia Development." Washington Times. February 19, 2007.
- Drobnyk, Josh. "D.C. Land Swap Could Get Kicked to the Curb in '06." Washington Business Journal. July 17, 2006.
- ElBoghdady, Dina. "Call Goes Out for Southwest Waterfront Developers." Washington Post. March 1, 2006.
- Federis, Marnette and Yehle, Emily. "Southwest Waterfront Transferred to AWC." Roll Call. February 26, 2007.
- Haine-Roberts, Evan and Yehle, Emily. "City Council Questions Anacostia Corporation." Roll Call. January 25, 2007.
- Hedgpeth, Dana. "Altman's Departure Has Developers Sighing." Washington Post. October 10, 2005.
- Hedgpeth, Dana. "Anacostia Group Looks Beyond the Ballpark." Washington Post. June 26, 2006.
- Hedgpeth, Dana. "Competing Developers Share Waterfront Ideas." Washington Post. July 31, 2006.
- Hedgpeth, Dana. "Development Agencies Defend Performance." Washington Post. January 15, 2007.
- Hedgpeth, Dana. "Firms Bid on Land by Stadium." Washington Post. October 22, 2005.
- Hedgpeth, Dana. "Moving Metro Office Could Spur Growth." Washington Post. August 8, 2005.
- Hedgpeth, Dana. "A New Blueprint for D.C. Waterfront." Washington Post. September 29, 2006.
- Hedgpeth, Dana. "New CEO To Steer Riverfront Projects." Washington Post. November 12, 2005.
- Hedgpeth, Dana. "Plans for Southwest Waterfront Hit Snag." Washington Post. November 6, 2006.
- Hedgpeth, Dana. "'Teams' to Develop Ballpark Area." Washington Post. December 13, 2005.
- Hedgpeth, Dana and Wilgoren, Debbi. "SE Development in Limbo As Official Plans to Resign." Washington Post. October 7, 2005.
- Holly, Derrill. "D.C. Officials Press Revitalization of Anacostia Waterfront." Associated Press. January 14, 2004.
- Holly, Derrill. "Teams Picked to Revitalize Waterfront." Associated Press. December 12, 2005.
- Kang, Cecilia. "Land Swap Complete, Waterfront Plan Revived." Washington Post. February 19, 2007.
- Killian, Erin. "Merger of D.C. Development Agencies Now Official." Washington Business Journal. July 20, 2007.
- Labbe, Theola S. "Advice, Fear at D.C. Stadium Session." Washington Post. April 24, 2005.
- Lemke, Tim. "D.C. Asks Court Help to Evict Landowners." Washington Times. January 25, 2006.
- Lemke, Tim. "D.C. Soccer Stadium Appears in Jeopardy." Washington Times. July 24, 2007.
- Lemke, Tim. "Group Pitches 'Ballpark District'." Washington Times. October 22, 2005.
- Lemke, Tim. "Landowners Must Yield to Ballpark." Washington Times. October 6, 2005.
- Lemke, Tim. "New Deal Made on Stadium Parking." Washington Times. June 21, 2006.
- Lemke, Tim and Doolittle, Amy. "Mayor Creates Office to Oversee Development." Washington Times. June 1, 2006.
- Lively, Tarron. "Stadium Fallout Worries Residents." Washington Times. April 24, 2005.
- Madigan, Sean. "Anacostia Pushes Metro to Move Across the River." Washington Business Journal. November 6, 2006.
- Madigan, Sean. "AWC Picks 2 Finalists for Waterfront Project." Washington Business Journal. August 15, 2006.
- Madigan, Sean. "D.C. Council Committee OKs Land Swap for Development Projects." Washington Business Journal. November 6, 2006.
- Madigan, Sean. "D.C., D.C. United Not United Over Poplar Point Plans." Washington Business Journal. October 23, 2006.
- Madigan, Sean. "D.C. Waterfront Group Narrows Redevelopment Contenders to Five." Washington Business Journal. June 13, 2006.
- Madigan, Sean. "Final Detail of Land Swap Isn't Slowing AWC Down." Washington Business Journal. November 27, 2006.
- Madigan, Sean. "Firms Hope to Ride Wave of Development on D.C.'s Southwest Waterfront." Washington Business Journal. May 1, 2006.
- Madigan, Sean. "NCRC Blames AWC, D.C. AG for Delayed Land Deal." Washington Business Journal. August 28, 2006.
- Madigan, Sean. "PN Hoffman/Struever to Lead $500M Southwest Waterfront Revitalization." Washington Business Journal. September 28, 2006.
- Madigan, Sean. "Southwest Waterfront Takes Another Step Forward." Washington Business Journal. March 1, 2006.
- Madigan, Sean and Drobnyk, Josh. "Mayor Proposes $230M Jump-Start for SE Fed Center." Washington Business Journal. June 5, 2006.
- Nakamura, David. "D.C. Seeks to Buy Land for 'Ballpark District'." Washington Post. August 12, 2005.
- Nakamura, David. "In Ward 8, Residents Voice Skepticism of Poplar Point Plan." Washington Post. January 21, 2007.
- Nakamura, David. "Official Promises To Deliver Stadium." Washington Post. January 17, 2006.
- Nakamura, David. "Owners, D.C. at Odds Over Stadium Parking." Washington Post. May 25, 2006.
- Nakamura, David and Heath, Thomas. "Garage Plan for Stadium At Risk." Washington Post. September 16, 2006.
- Nakamura, David and Heath, Thomas. "Land Sale Possible To Fund Stadium." Washington Post. December 28, 2005.
- O'Connell, Jonathan. "City Says Consolidation of Development Projects to Save D.C. More Than $5 Million Annually." Washington Business Journal. September 24, 2007.
- O'Connell, Jonathan. "D.C. Council OKs Audits of Deputy Mayor's Projects." Washington Business Journal. April 7, 2008.
- O'Connell, Jonathan. "D.C. Economic Development Official Faces Council Calls for Increased Oversight." Washington Business Journal. December 10, 2007.
- Ramstack, Tom. "Council Doubts Agencies' Dealings." Washington Times. March 8, 2007.
- Ramstack, Tom. "Waterfront to Be 'Transformed'." Washington Times. January 16, 2008.
- Schroeder, Peter. "Trends in the Region: D.C.'s Skyland Project to Advance Despite Agency Dissolution." The Bond Buyer. July 9, 2007.
- Schwartzman, Paul. "Fenty, Brown Face Fight to Revamp Agencies." Washington Post. June 5, 2007.
- Schwartzman, Paul. "Mayor's Office Frowns on Council's Plan for Development Agency." Washington Post. May 16, 2007.
- Stewart, Nikita. "Chief of Anacostia Group Resigns." Washington Post. February 14, 2007.
- Stewart, Nikita. "Council Votes to Close 2 Waterfront Agencies." Washington Post. June 6, 2007.
- Vadum, Matthew. "D.C. Council Approves Plan To Create New Waterfront Corp." The Bond Buyer. July 14, 2004.
- Vadum, Matthew. "District of Columbia: Mayor Signs Waterfront Revitalization Legislation." The Bond Buyer. August 6, 2004.
- "Waterfront Corp. Names Development Finalists." Roll Call. June 15, 2006.
- Wilgoren, Debbi. "D.C. Environmental Refuge Eyed." Washington Post. May 11, 2005.
- Wilgoren, Debbi. "D.C. to Unveil Ambitious Anacostia Waterfront Plan." Washington Post. December 3, 2003.
- Wilgoren, Debbi. "Williams Proposes Moving Metro Offices to Anacostia." Washington Post. August 4, 2005.
- Yehle, Emily. "Anacostia Group Sets Strict Environmental Standards." Roll Call. February 15, 2007.
- Yehle, Emily. "AWC Environmental Standards Earn Awards." Roll Call. April 23, 2007.
- Yehle, Emily. "AWC Head Offers Five Proposals." Roll Call. March 15, 2007.
- Yehle, Emily. "AWC Offers Plan for Job-Training Program." Roll Call. March 5, 2007.
- Yehle, Emily. "Bill Targets Anacostia Corp." Roll Call. January 22, 2007.
- Yehle, Emily. "Council Eliminates AWC." Roll Call. June 6, 2007.
- Yehle, Emily. "D.C. Council Passes AWC-NCRC Compromise." Roll Call. May 17, 2007.
- Yehle, Emily. "President Resigns From AWC." Roll Call. February 15, 2007.
- Yehle, Emily. "Transition Plans for AWC, NCRC Outlined." Roll Call. July 16, 2007.
