= Kenilworth (Washington, D.C.) =

Coordinates: 38.9091°N 76.9398°W

- Neighborhood of Washington, D.C.
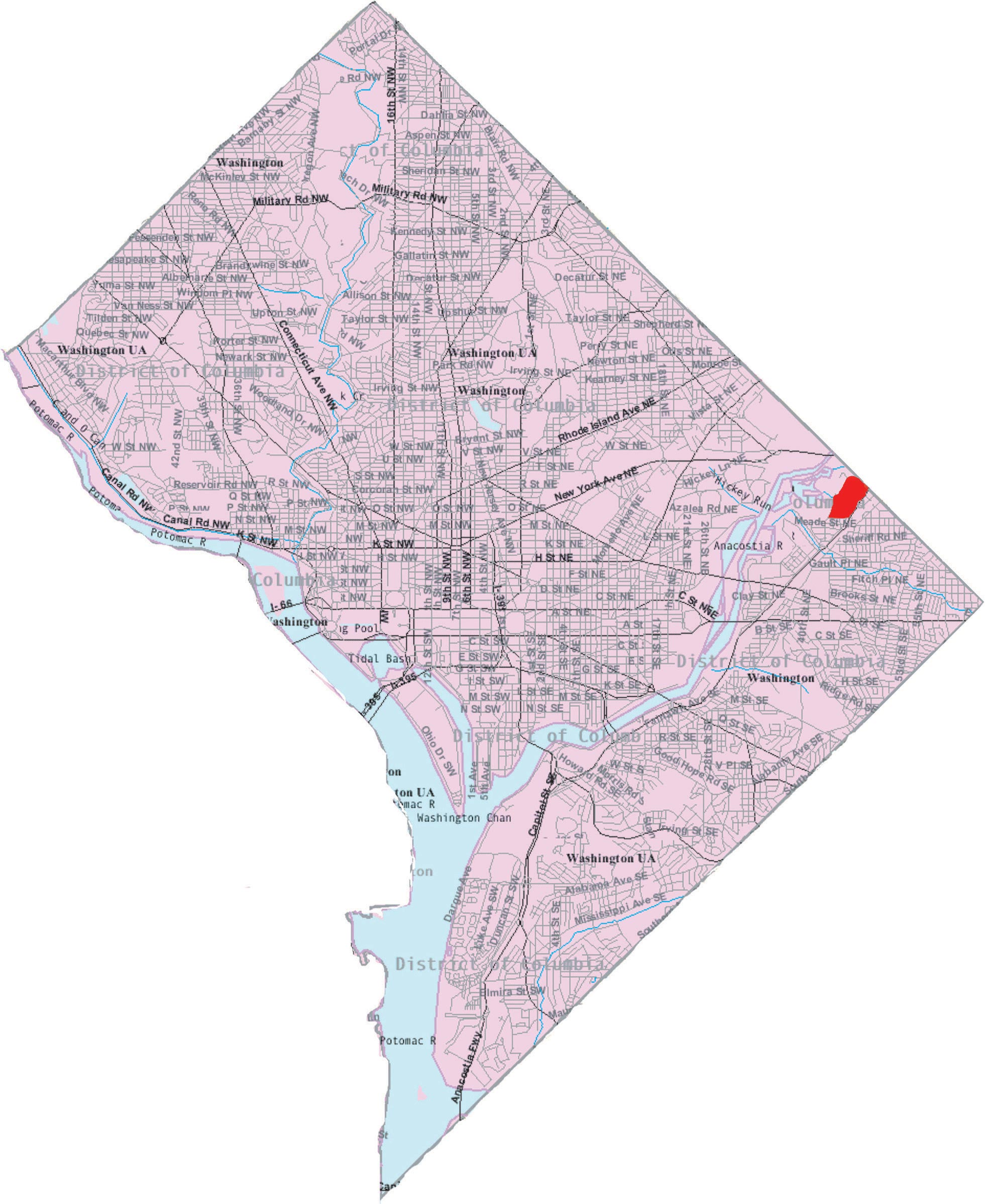
- Kenilworth within the District of Columbia
- Country: United States
- District: Washington, D.C.
- Ward: Ward 7

Government
  - Councilmember: Wendell Felder

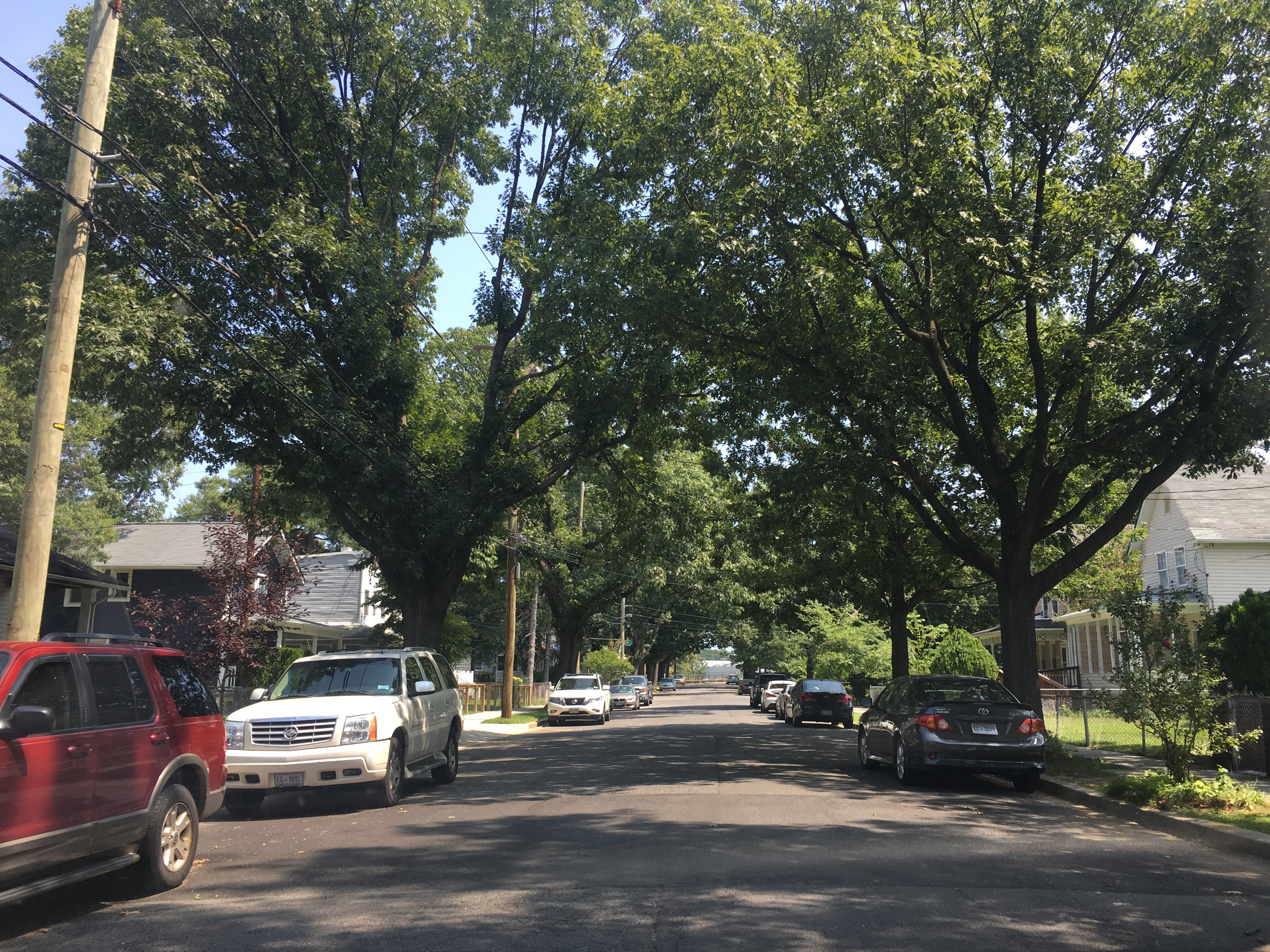
Kenilworth neighborhood at the intersection of Ord St. and 44th St. in August 2018

Kenilworth is a residential neighborhood in Northeast Washington, D.C., located on the eastern bank of the Anacostia River and just inside the D.C.–Maryland border. A large public housing complex, Kenilworth Courts, dominates the area. The neighborhood is famous for the Kenilworth Park and Aquatic Gardens, a national park whose centerpiece is a series of ponds carved out of Anacostia River marshland. Visitors come especially during June and July to see the beautiful blooming water lilies and lotus flowers. In 1895, the name "Kenilworth" was first applied to the area by real estate developer Allen Mallery, who named this neighborhood after Kenilworth Castle in England, the ruins of which can still be seen today in Warwickshire. Kenilworth Park, which includes the Kenilworth-Parkside Recreation Center, also carries the neighborhood name, though most of the park's area is actually located adjacent to the modern neighborhoods of Parkside and Eastland Gardens.

The boundaries of Kenilworth are not always agreed upon. A broad interpretation of neighborhood area has Kenilworth bounded by Eastern Avenue to the north, Nash Street to the south, Anacostia Avenue to the west, and the tracks of the Washington Metro to the east. A stricter interpretation of neighborhood boundaries, based on present-day resident understanding, would be the DC-MD line to the north, Piney Branch or Nash Run creek to the south (on the other side of which is the Eastland Gardens neighborhood), Anacostia Avenue to the west, and Kenilworth Avenue to the east.

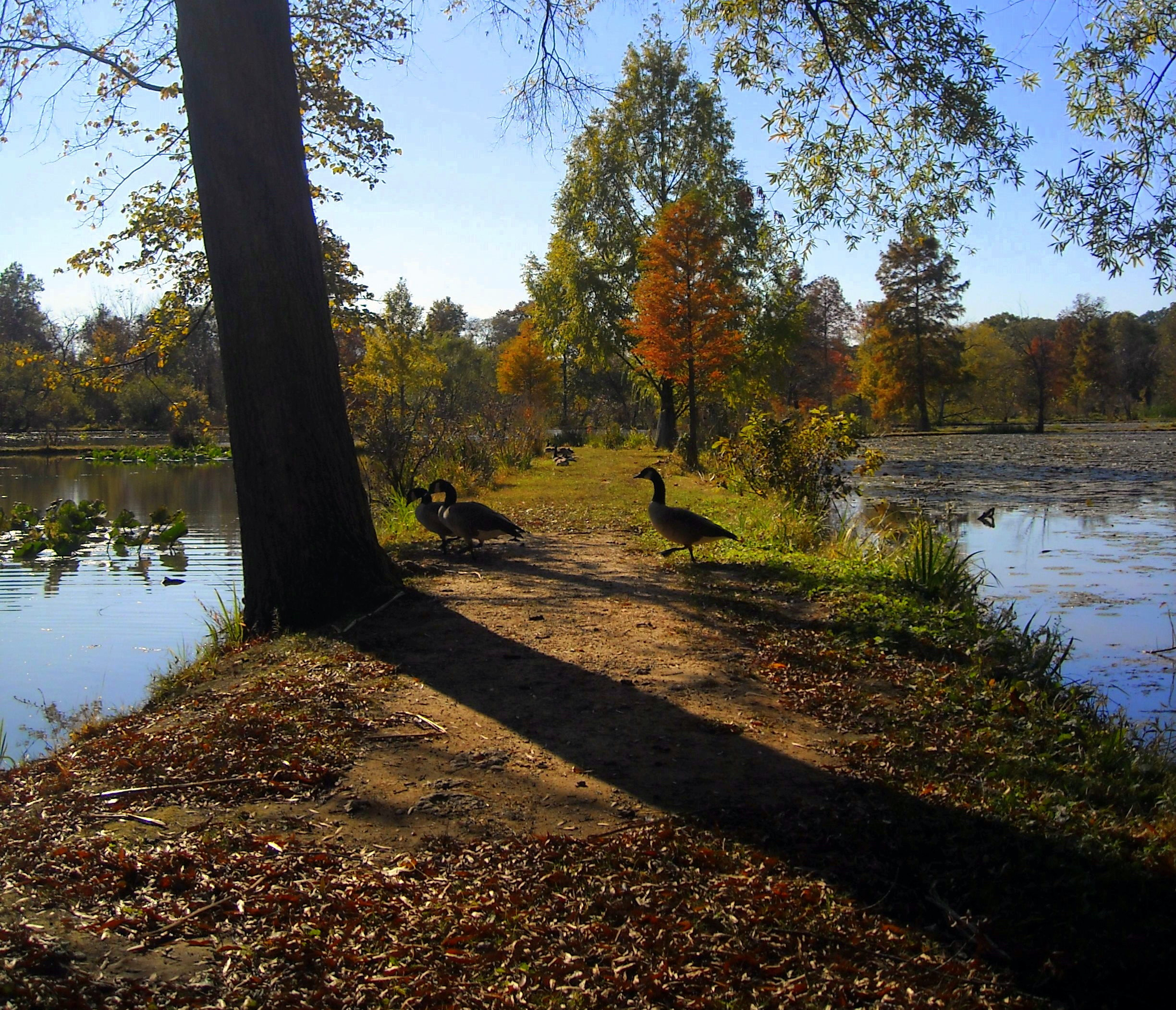
Geese crossing a path in the Kenilworth Park and Aquatic Gardens

To meet the needs of the expanding population of Washington, D.C., in 1942 the Kenilworth Dump was created on the riverside south of the Kenilworth neighborhood, where piles of garbage were burned in the open space. The community complained about the pollution from open burning, and Lady Bird Johnson became involved in the campaign to close the dump. In February 1968 a boy was accidentally burned to death at the site. Shortly afterwards the city banned the open fires and the Dump became a sanitary landfill instead. In the early 1970s, the Dump closed and the land was converted to a park.

Kenilworth gained national attention in 1988 when its government-built housing development, Kenilworth Courts (along with a small sister development called Parkside, located about a mile southwest of Kenilworth), became the first public housing project to be sold to its residents in an initiative championed by Mayor Marion Barry, President Ronald Reagan, and U.S. Representative Jack Kemp. In the neighborhood, this effort was directed by Kenilworth Courts resident Kimi Gray, who formed the Kenilworth-Parkside Resident Management Corporation (KPRMC). Subsequent renovations of the complex did not go as planned, and in early 2000 the DC Housing Authority (DCHA) took back control of much of the neighborhood. Kimi Gray, whose leadership had driven the resident management and ownership movement, died in 2000. KPRMC still controls about a third of Kenilworth Courts' 400-plus units, but a plan for residents to actually own their own homes never came through.

About 40% of Kenilworth-Parkside residents lived below the poverty level in 2016. The DC Promise Neighborhood Initiative works with local schools and provides supportive services to families. Almost half of the neighborhood's 2,000 children in attend schools in other parts of the city.

The Anacostia Waterfront Corporation, a city-chartered corporation charged with developing the area along the Anacostia River, has plans to revitalize the Kenilworth's sister neighborhood of Parkside as a mixed-income, mixed-use neighborhood, including 2,000 new residential units and 500,000 square feet (50,000 m^{2}) of commercial space.

The neighborhood was cut off from the rest of the city when the Anacostia Freeway was built in the 1950s, and has no grocery store. AWC intends to work extensively on making the area more pedestrian-friendly, by building walkways to the Anacostia Riverwalk and Marvin Gaye Park and a pedestrian bridge to the Minnesota Avenue station, the closest Metro station to Kenilworth. AWC presented the final plan to the D.C. Council in 2007.
