= Redundant elevators =

Multiple elevators in one building

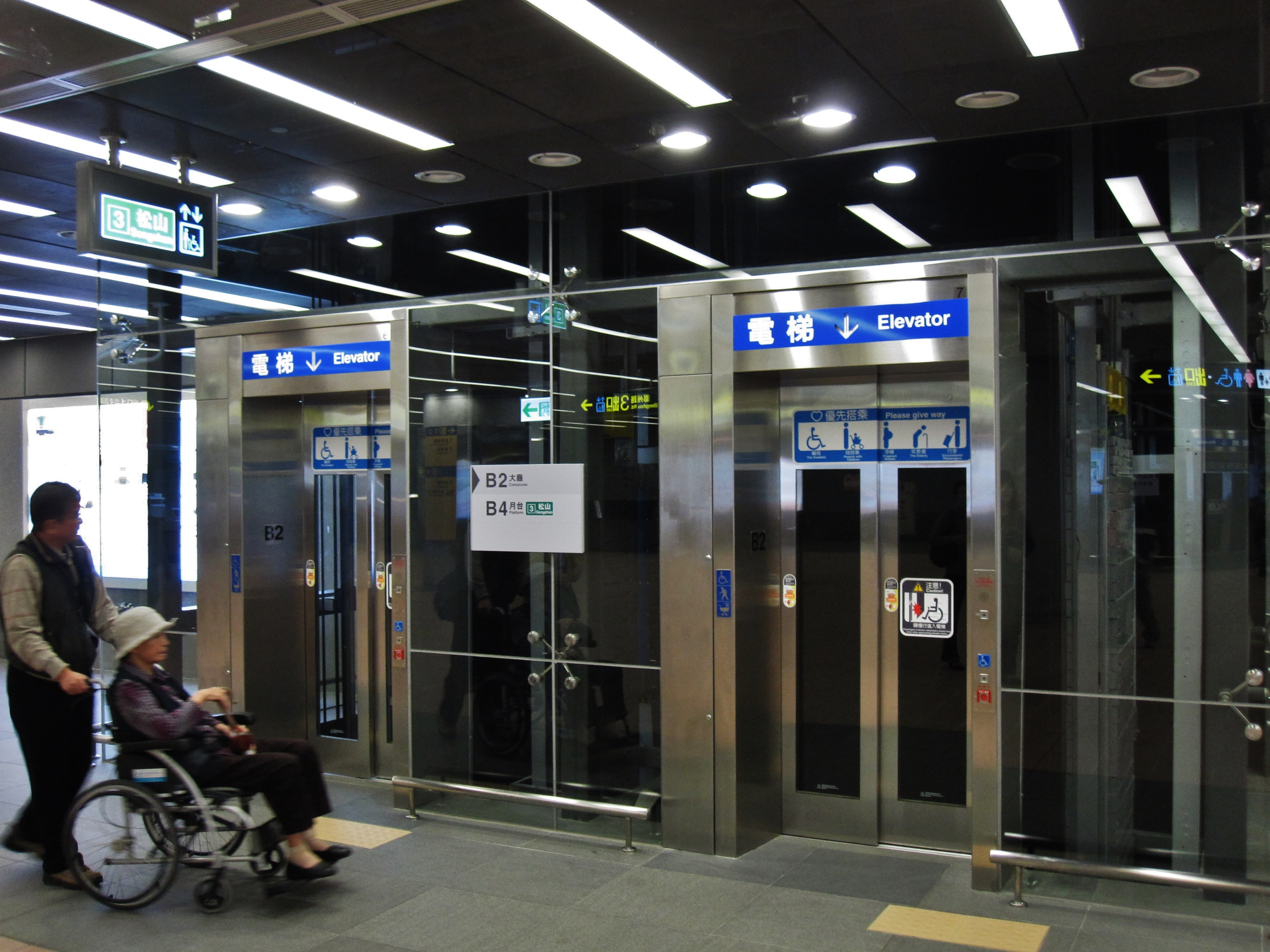
Elevators at Beimen metro station in Taipei, Taiwan, November 2014.

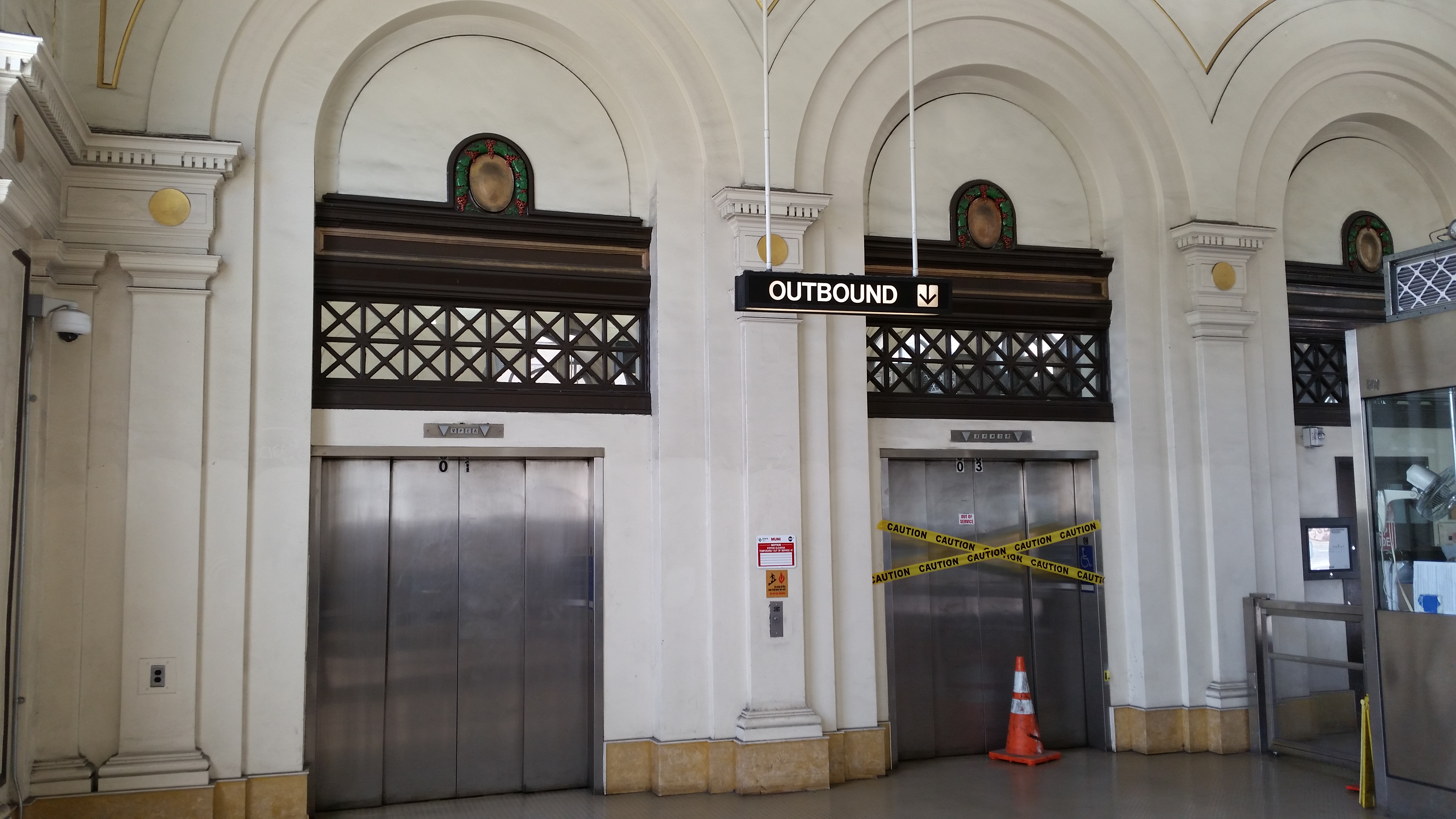
A broken elevator at the Forest Hill station in San Francisco, June 2017.

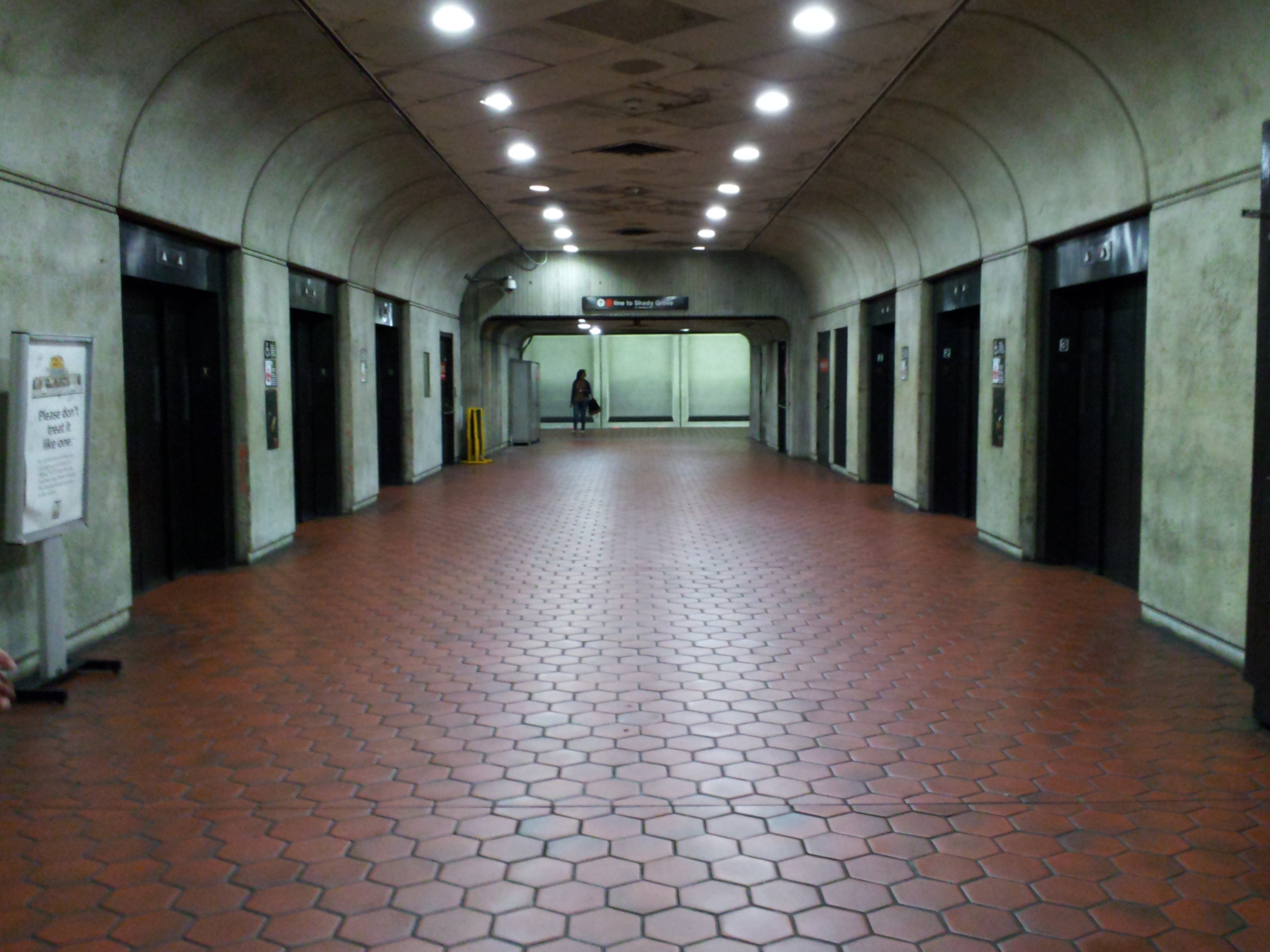
Elevators at the Forest Glen station in Forest Glen, Maryland, September 2011.

Redundant elevators are additional elevators installed to guarantee greater accessibility of buildings and public transportation systems in the event that an elevator malfunctions or is undergoing repairs. The United States Disability Rights Education and Defense Fund describes redundant elevators as a "best practice" and recommends all transit agencies "consider installing redundant elevators at all existing key stations with elevators in rapid, light, and commuter rail, and at all Amtrak stations with elevators."

== Legislation ==
=== United States ===
The Americans with Disabilities Act of 1990 requires elevators for new construction and alterations in public accommodations and commercial facilities, with some exceptions. However, there are no requirements for redundant elevators.

== Redundant elevators in public transportation ==
=== Canada ===
==== Ottawa ====
Ottawa's OC Transpo has committed to installing redundant elevators at all transfer stations and stations where alternative accessible routes cannot be provided.

=== United States ===
==== Bay Area Rapid Transit ====
All Bay Area Rapid Transit stations have accessible elevators, however most stations lack redundant elevators. BART has committed to increasing elevator redundancy within its system.

==== Connecticut Department of Transportation ====
Connecticut Department of Transportation policy states that at stations without redundant elevators, signage must be posted near all elevators displaying a 24-hour monitored telephone number that connects the passenger to a mobility taxi service.

==== MBTA ====
As part of a 2006 agreement between the Massachusetts Bay Transportation Authority (MBTA) and the Boston Center for Independent Living, MBTA has agreed to install redundant elevators at stations in their system.

==== Washington Metro ====
Since 2003, the Washington Metro has required that all newly constructed stations must have redundant elevators. As of 2025, all Washington Metro stations are wheelchair accessible but the majority of stations lack redundant elevators. 23 out of 98 stations have at least one redundant elevator, with redundant elevators planned for installation at four other stations.
