= Red Swan =

Red Swan may refer to:

- "Red Swan" (song), a song by Yoshiki feat. Hyde
- Red swan, a motif in the Kandyan jewellery of Sri Lanka
- "Red Swan", a song from Susumu Yokota's 2002 album The Boy and the Tree
- "Red Swan", a song from the video game Pump It Up
- Red Swan, a book by Sebastian Heilmann
- Red Swan, a statue by Rainer Lagemann

== See also ==
- Red Swan Hotel, a fictional hotel in Brial O'Nolan's 1939 novel At Swim-Two-Birds
- Red (disambiguation)
- Swan (disambiguation)
