= Kreeger Museum =

Art museum in Washington, D.C.

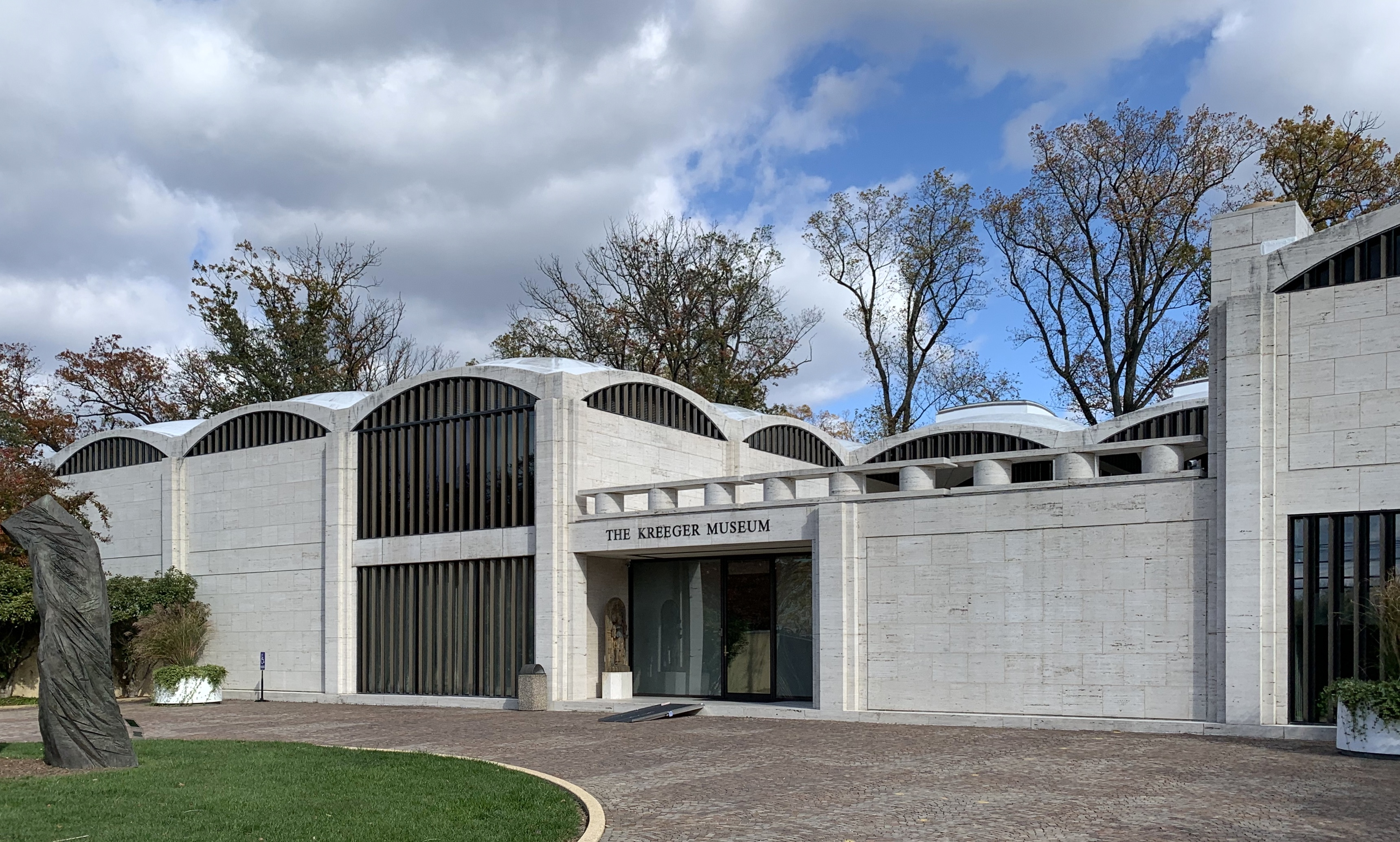

- Location in District of Columbia Kreeger Museum (the United States)
- Established: 1994
- Location: Washington, D.C.
- Coordinates: 38.921814°N 77.089117°W
- Website: https://www.kreegermuseum.org/

The Kreeger Museum is a modern and contemporary non-profit art museum located in Washington, D.C., United States. It is located on Foxhall Road, one of the residential neighborhoods of the city, in the former home of Carmen and David Lloyd Kreeger and it contains the art collection of nineteenth- and twentieth-century paintings and sculpture they acquired from 1952 to 1988.

== Architecture ==
The building was designed in 1963 by Pritzker Prize winning architect Philip Johnson (known for building in the "International Style" at that time), together with Richard Foster, and sits on five and a half wooded acres in Northwest DC.

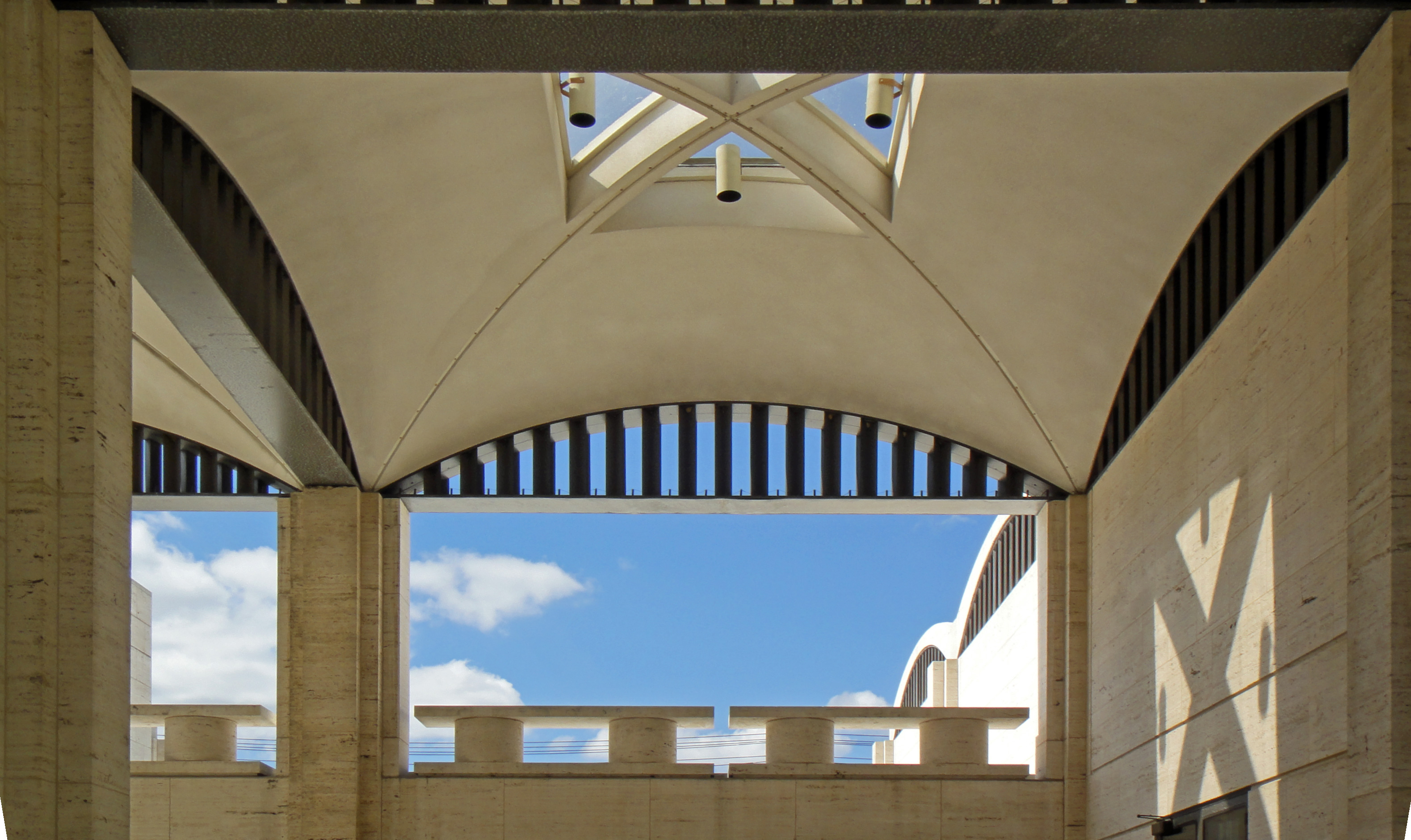

The design brief was for a private residence that, one day, would become a museum harbouring the art collection acquired by the Kreegers. The building served as the Kreeger home from 1967 to 1990. On June 1, 1994, the Kreeger Museum opened to the public.

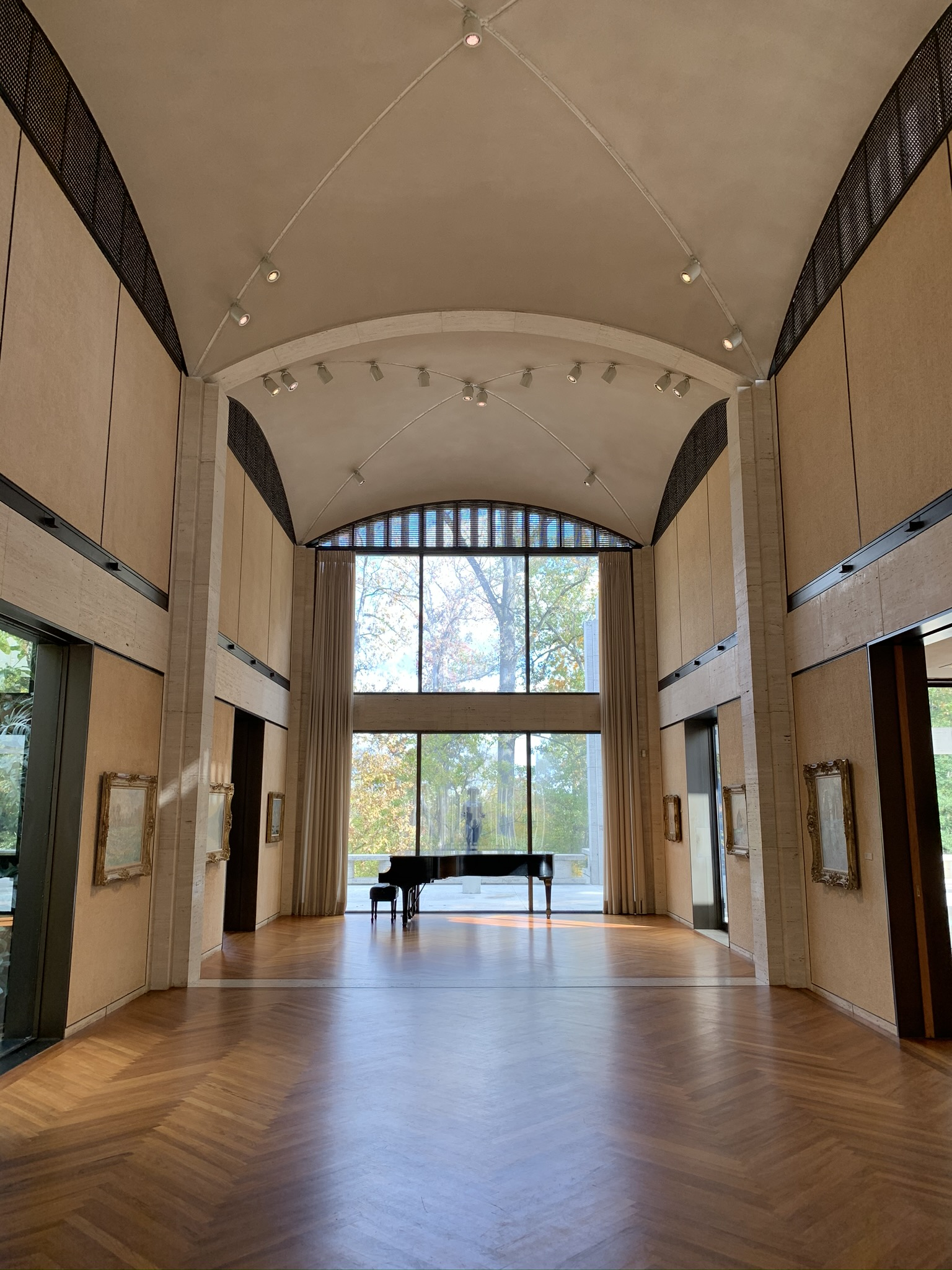
The Great Hall

My thoughts about the house today have not changed since it was first conceived. I believe it answered perfectly the program set forth by the Kreegers. Its monumentality is as correct and current today as it was when built. To the mantle of public leadership that he assumed so willingly. To the long-range vision that his home would eventually be a museum, constructed for the delight of generations that would follow his rich and rewarding life.

— Richard Foster, 1994

Johnson proposed a modern interpretation of a Roman villa, complete with sculpture terraces and reflecting pools, set in a décor of sprawling indoor and outdoor gardens. This may have resulted in his choice to build with travertine, a kind of young limestone, often used in Ancient Roman architecture and in neoclassical buildings, long the favorite style for government buildings in Washington, but mostly eschewed by other proponents of modernist architecture.

The house is protected from the main road by a 435 ft (132,5 m) long wall in rough-hewn travertine. For the Kreeger residence, Johnson envisaged a composition of asymmetrically arranged, groin-vaulted cubes with travertine walls facing the street and glass walls that open up vistas onto the wooded site surrounding the house. The building with a gross surface area of 24,000 ft^{2} (2230 m^{2}) was designed on the basis of a modular system of cubes measuring 22 x 22 x 22 ft (6,7 x 6,7 x 6,7 m). The modular concept allowed the cubes to be adapted for different functions : living space, gallery space or both. The largest open space in the building, The Great Hall, a two-story space that rises up to 25 feet (7,6 m), is topped by 3 vaulted domes that create a natural amplification system and provides acoustics suitable for chamber and piano music.

The architect's consideration for the use of natural light and the articulation of structure, expressed by the travertine-covered reinforced concrete frame, the slim vaults covering each 22-foot module, or the baluster-like posts of the steel trusses that separate each vault, is paramount and complements the clarity of the plan. The particular dimensional units of similar size and the attention of the architect to progression through them is the "secret" to the pleasure of experiencing this particular building.

In the original design, the art galleries on all three levels did not invade the private areas but were adjacent to them, free-flowing spaces as opposed to the contained cubes of family rooms. Walls in the gallery spaces are covered with cream-colored carpet to blend with the natural stone which facilitates the changing of paintings. Most rooms in the house have oiled brown chevron wood floors, which adds warmth to the beige interior.

Johnson's melding of historicism and modernism results in a somewhat romantic yet functional house in the grand manner, where the same module, same clerestory lighting, and same tent-like vaults shelter intimate and public spaces alike.

The building was constructed from 1966 to 1969 and made on the basis of a structural design using steel, concrete blocks and bricks. Seventeen concrete domes form the distinctive roof and are covered with a synthetic rubberized waterproofing material. The modern exterior, inspired in part by Philip Johnson's admiration for and prior collaboration with Ludwig Mies van der Rohe on the Seagram Building in New York, is clad with 900 tonnes of hand-selected Italian travertine slabs. Richard Foster, Johnson's partner, supervised the construction of the building and traveled twice to the quarries in Italy to oversee the selection and labeling of the slabs.

== Collection ==
The Kreeger collection comprises mainly works from the 1850s to the present.

=== Painting collection ===
The nineteenth century is represented by work of Corot, Daubigny, Fantin-Latour and Vincent van Gogh. The Impressionists and Post-Impressionists are represented by nine Claude Monet paintings, as well as works by Auguste Renoir, Alfred Sisley, Paul Cézanne, Edgar Degas and Camille Pissarro.

The collection includes nine paintings by Pablo Picasso. Other 20th century European artists include Edvard Munch, Max Beckmann, Jean Dubuffet, Wassily Kandinsky, Marc Chagall, George Braque, Fernand Léger, Pierre Bonnard, Paul Delvaux, James Ensor and Joan Miró.

American artists include, among others, Alexander Calder, Arshile Gorky, Clyfford Still, Frank Stella, Helen Frankenthaler, Joan Mitchell, Anne Truitt and James Rosenquist. Washington artists represented include William Christenberry, Gene Davis, Thomas Downing, Sam Gilliam and Betsy Stewart.

=== Sculpture collection ===
The museum galleries house work by European artists such as Kenneth Armitage, Constantin Brâncuși, Jacques Lipchitz, Auguste Renoir and Medardo Rosso. Auguste Rodin has five works in the collection.

American sculptors represented are: Harry Bertoia, Alexander Calder, Richard Deutsch, a.o.

The permanent collection also includes examples of art from west and central Africa and Asia integrated throughout the museum.

=== Prints and drawings collection ===
The museum has a well documented collection on paper by the artists and sculptors already present in the collection with other works.

== Sculpture Garden ==
The Sculpture Garden, an extension of the Museum, expands the outdoor exhibition space and features work by Rainer Lagemann, George Rickey, Lucien Wercollier and notable Washington, DC- area artists Kendall Buster, Carol Brown Goldberg, Dalya Luttwak and Foon Sham.

The Sculpture Terrace features works by Jean Arp, Aristide Maillol, Jacques Lipchitz, Henry Moore, Isamu Noguchi and Francesco Somaini.

The Reflecting Pool Terrace features Inventions, a series of six large-scale sculptures by John L. Dreyfuss.

== Selected works ==
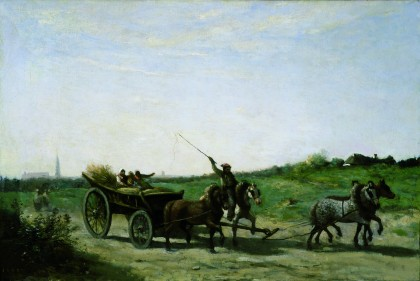
The Wagon of Arras (1853), Jean-Baptiste-Camille Corot

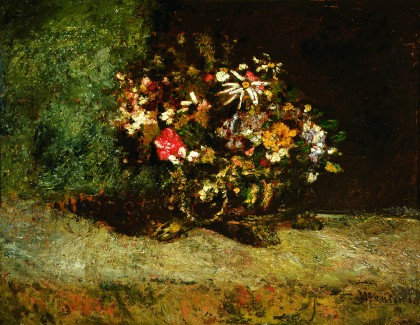
Flowers in a Copper Bowl (1875), Adolphe Monticelli

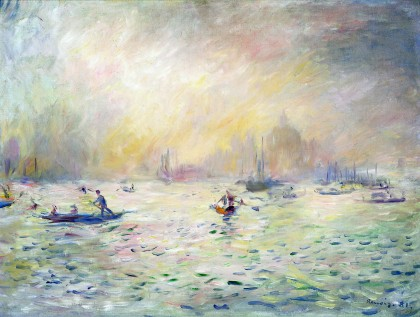
Venice — Fog (1881), Pierre-Auguste Renoir

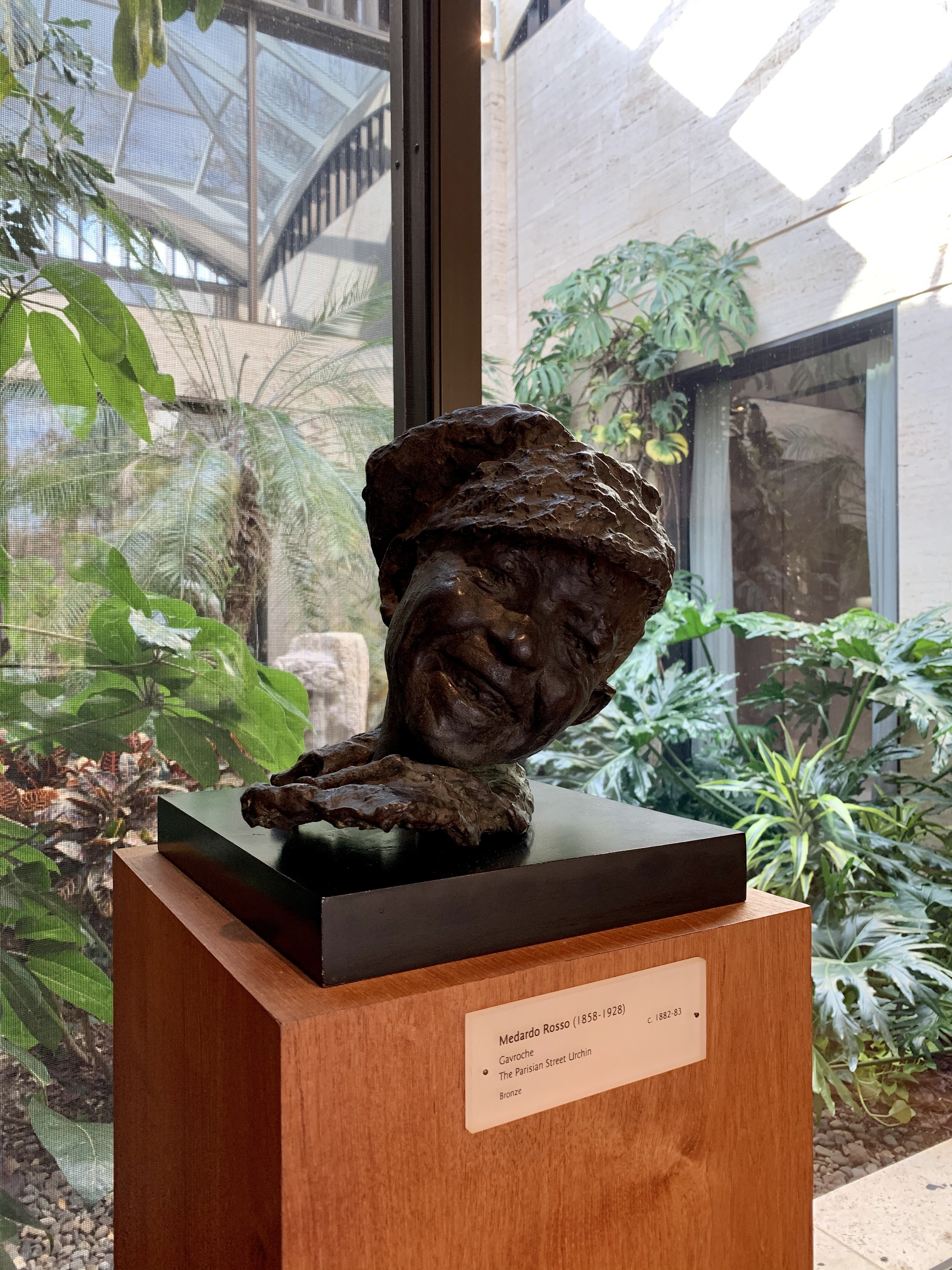
Gavroche (1882), Medardo Rosso

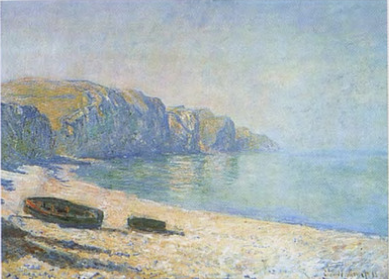
Boats on the Beach at Pourville, Low Tide (1882), Claude Monet

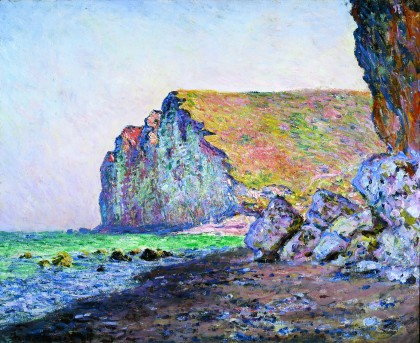
Cliffs at Les Petites-Dalles (1884), Claude Monet

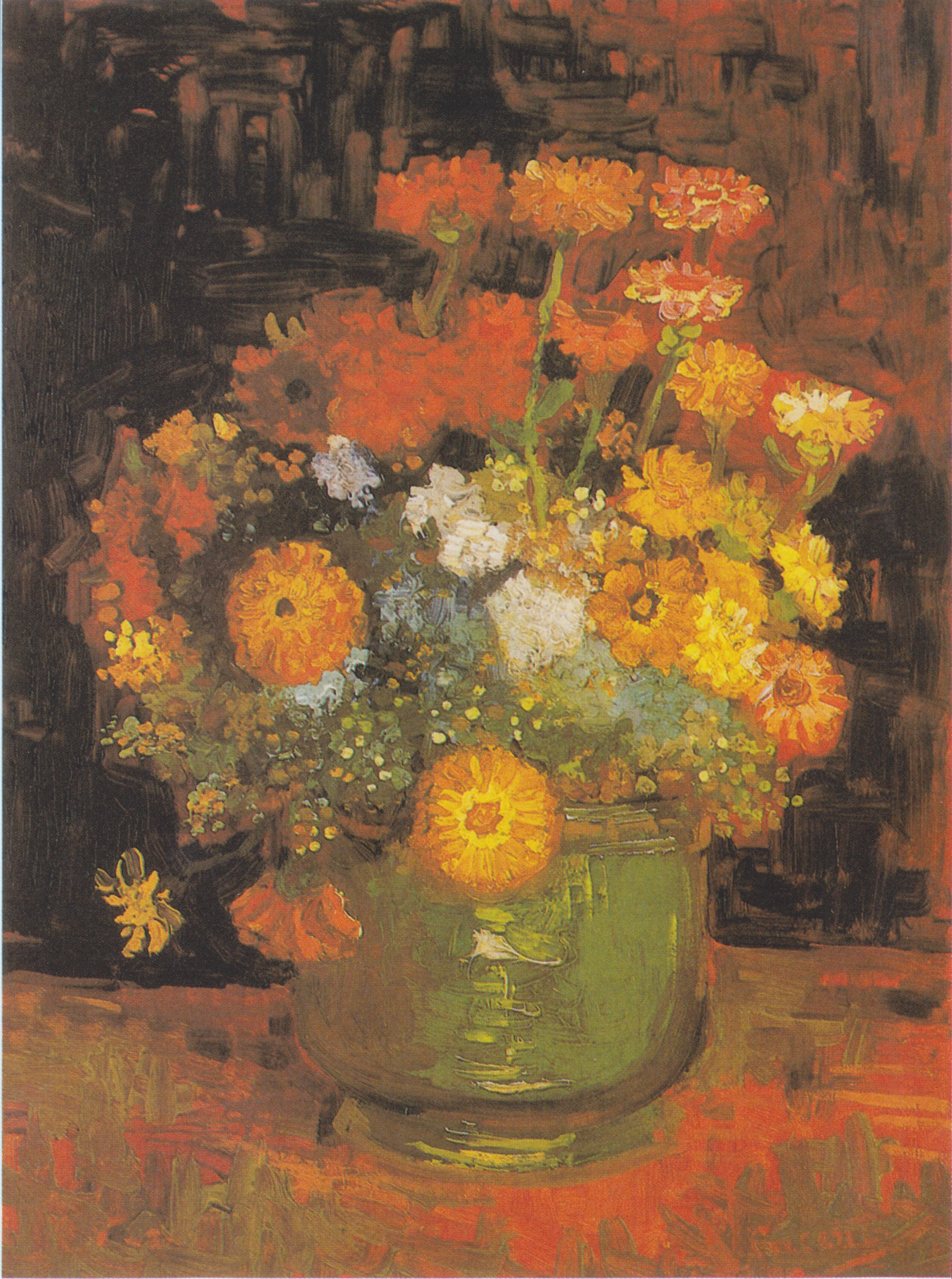
Bowl with Zinnias (1886), Vincent van Gogh

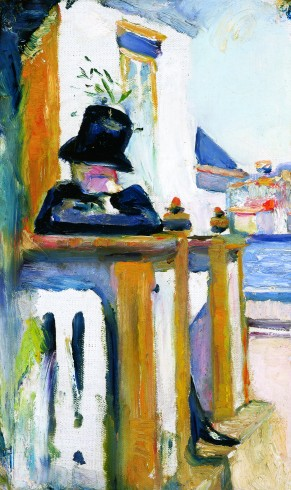
Man on the Veranda (1886), Edvard Munch

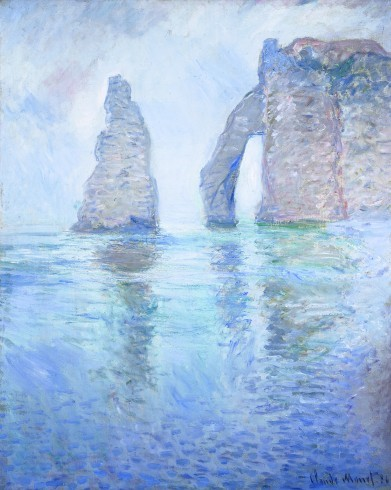
The Rock Needle and the Porte d'Aval Seen from the West (1886), Claude Monet

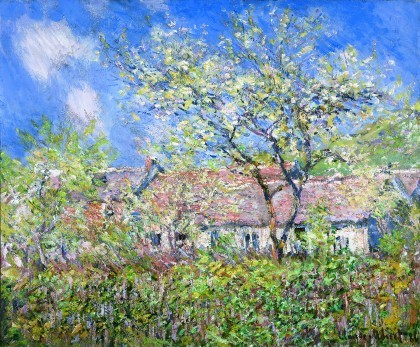
Springtime at Giverny (1886), Claude Monet

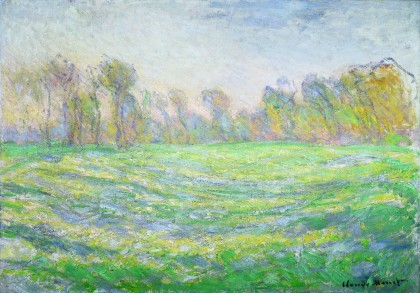
Meadow at Giverny (1888), Claude Monet

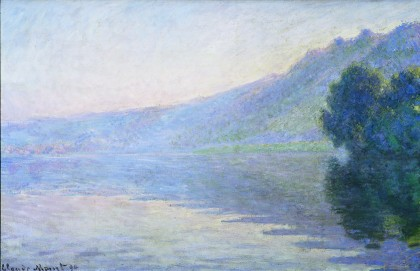
The Seine at Port-Villez, Pink Effect (1894), Claude Monet

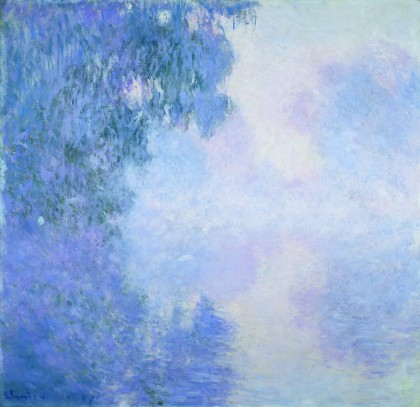
Arm of the Seine near Giverny in the Fog (1897), Claude Monet

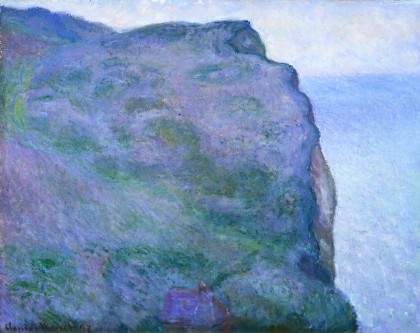
The Pointe du Petit Ailly in Gray Weather (1897), Claude Monet

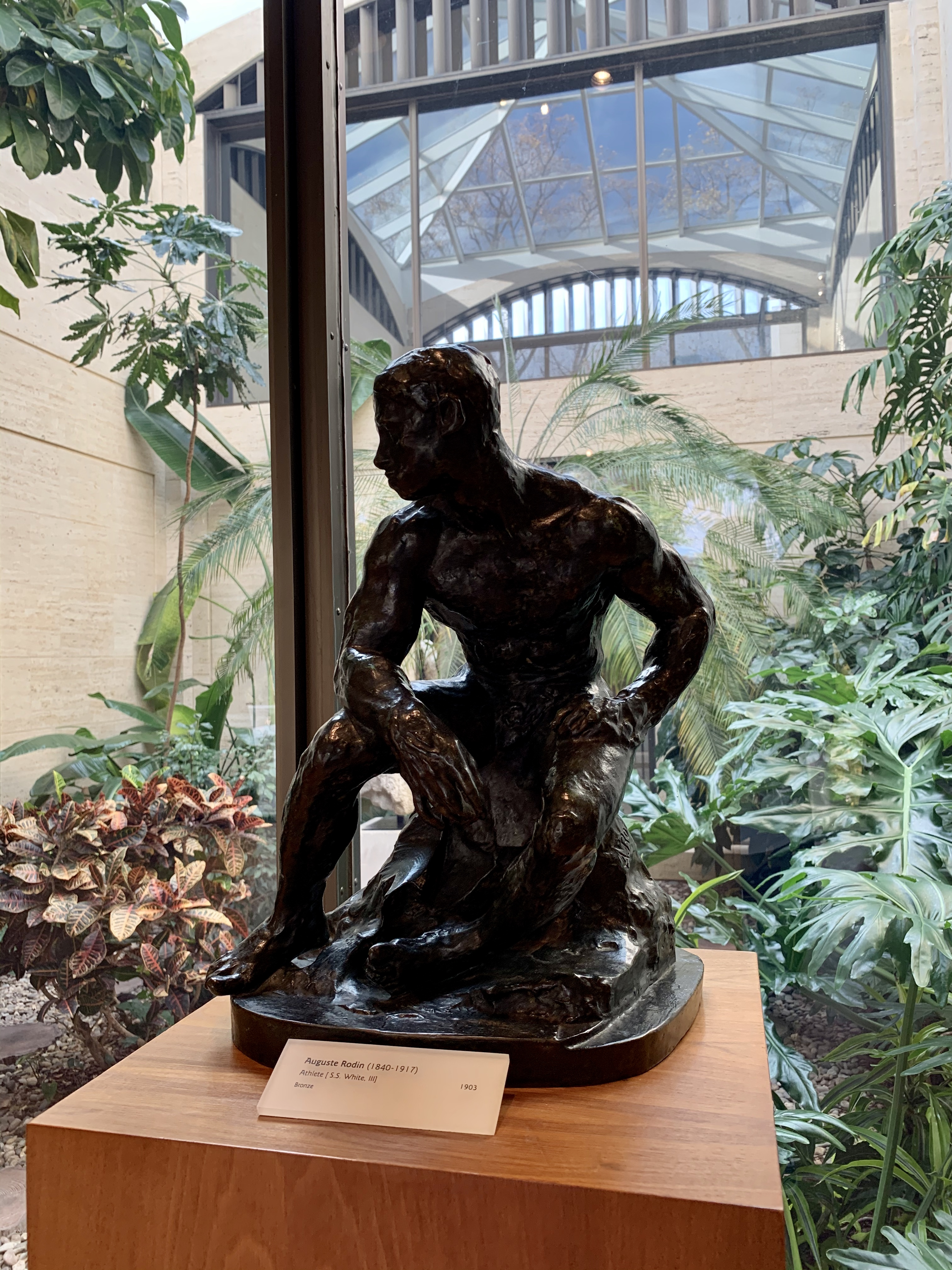
The Athlete (1903), Auguste Rodin

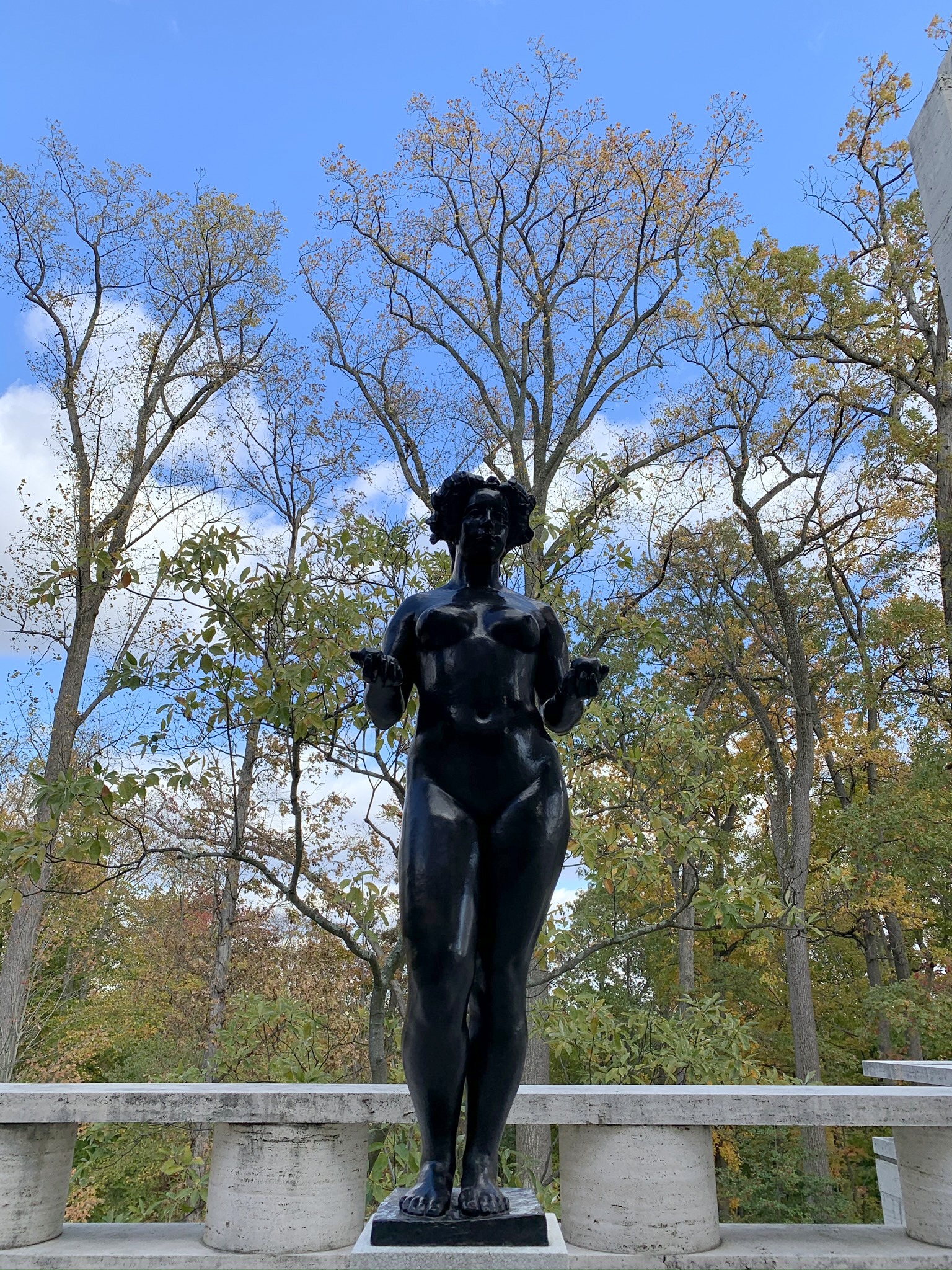
Pomona (1910), Aristide Maillol
