= NCTA =

NCTA is an abbreviation that may refer to:

- NCTA (association), formerly the National Cable and Telecommunications Association
- National Council for the Traditional Arts
- Nebraska College of Technical Agriculture
- National Capital Transportation Agency
- North Carolina Turnpike Authority
- North Central Texas Academy
- National Council for Technological Awards, predecessor of the Council for National Academic Awards

== See also ==
- NICTA, Australian Information and Communications Technology Research Centre of Excellence, now known as Data61 within CSIRO
