= Washington Metropolitan Area Transit Authority =

Public transit agency in the Washington, D.C. area

Coordinates: 38°53′52.2″N 77°1′9.9″W

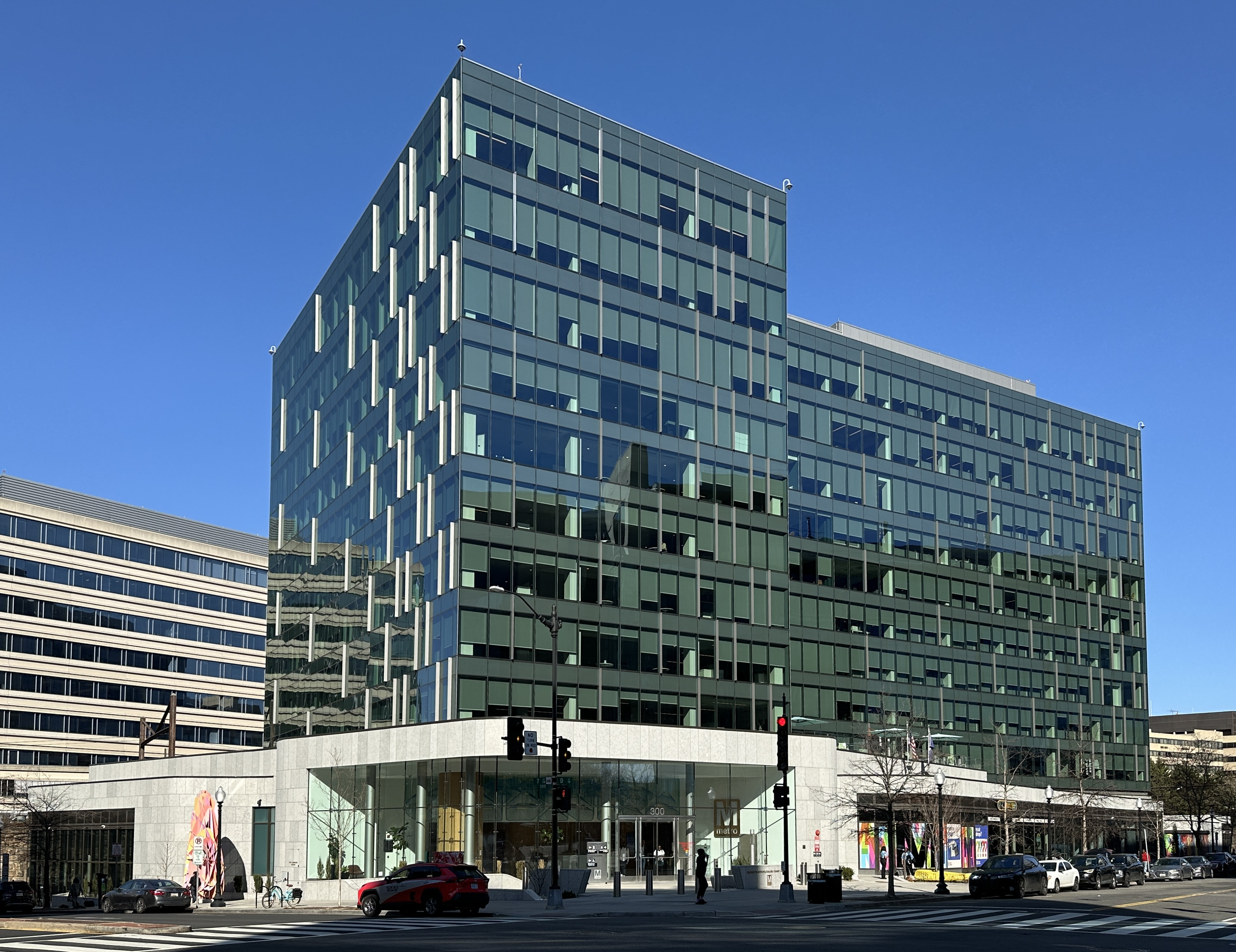
- WMATA's headquarters at L'Enfant Plaza

Agency overview
- Formed: February 20, 1967; 59 years ago
- Preceding agency: National Capital Transportation Agency
- Type: Interstate compact agency
- Jurisdiction: Washington, D.C., and parts of Maryland and Northern Virginia, U.S.
- Headquarters: 300 7th Street SW, Washington, D.C.
- Employees: 13,497 (2025)
- Agency executive: Randy Clarke, General Manager and CEO
- Key document: Washington Metropolitan Area Transit Authority Compact
- Website: wmata.com

The Washington Metropolitan Area Transit Authority (WMATA /wəˈmɑːtə/ wə-MAH-tə), commonly referred to as Metro, is a tri-jurisdictional public transit agency that operates transit services in the Washington metropolitan area. WMATA provides a rapid transit service under the Metrorail brand, fixed-route bus service under the Metrobus brand, and paratransit service under the MetroAccess brand. In 2025, the system had a ridership of 307,298,900, or about 889,900 per weekday as of the first quarter of 2026.

The agency participates in a regional transportation planning and the execution of transit infrastructure projects. Recent projects include an infill station serving Potomac Yard and an extension of Metrorail to Dulles International Airport.

WMATA was created in the late 1960s by the United States Congress as an interstate compact between Washington, D.C.; Maryland; and Virginia. The authority's board of directors consists of two voting representatives each from the District of Columbia, Maryland, Virginia, and the U.S. federal government. Each jurisdiction also appoints two alternate representatives. WMATA has no independent taxation authority and depends on its member jurisdictions for capital investments and operating funding.

WMATA has its own police force, the Metro Transit Police Department.

== History ==
=== Planning and creation ===
Washington Metropolitan Area Transit Authority Compact
- Long title: An Act to grant the consent of Congress for the States of Virginia and Maryland and the District of Columbia to amend the Washington Metropolitan Area Transit Regulation Compact to establish an organization empowered to provide transit facilities in the National Capital Region and for other purposes and to enact said amendment for the District of Columbia.
- Enacted by: the 89th United States Congress

Citations
- Public law: Pub. L. 89–774
- Statutes at Large: 80 Stat. 1324

Legislative history
- Introduced in the Senate as S. 3488 by A. Willis Robertson (D–VA) on June 6, 1966; Committee consideration by Senate Judiciary; Passed the Senate on August 25, 1966; Passed the House on October 7, 1966 with amendment; Senate agreed to House amendment on October 13, 1966 (unanimous consent); Signed into law by President Lyndon B. Johnson on November 5, 1966

Starting in the mid-19th century, the Washington area had been served by a variety of private bus lines and streetcar services, including extensions of Northern Virginia trolleys. Over time, most were absorbed into the Capital Transit Company, formed on December 1, 1933, by the amalgamation of the Washington Railway and Electric Company, Capital Traction, and the Washington Rapid Transit bus company. Financier Louis Wolfson acquired the company in 1949 but had his franchise revoked in 1955 amid a crippling strike. Congress then awarded a 20-year concession to O. Roy Chalk on the condition that he replace the city's remaining streetcars with buses by 1963. The company was thereafter known as D.C. Transit.

In 1955 the National Capital Planning Commission began work on an engineering study, the "Mass Transportation Survey—National Capital Region," to plan highway and mass transit systems that would meet the needs of the Washington area in 1980. In 1959, the study's final report called for the construction of two rapid transit subway lines in downtown Washington. Congress responded to the report by enacting the National Capital Transportation Act of 1960, which created the federal National Capital Transportation Agency (NCTA) to coordinate transportation planning for the area. The report also called for extensive freeway construction within the District of Columbia, but residents successfully lobbied for a moratorium on freeway construction in what became part of a movement called the "freeway revolts."

The NCTA's November 1962 "Transportation in the National Capital Region" report proposed an 89-mile (143 km) rail system that would cost $793 million, less than the 1959 plan because several controversial freeways were removed. The plan was supported by President John F. Kennedy, but opposed by highway advocates in Congress who reduced the rail system to only 23 miles (37 km) within the District of Columbia. However, that proposal was defeated in Congress shortly after President Kennedy's death in 1963. The Urban Mass Transportation Act of 1964 passed Congress, which promised 66% federal funding for urban mass transportation projects. Encouraged by the new act, the NCTA recommended the formation of a private entity or a multi-state authority to operate the system using more non-federal funds. On September 8, 1965, President Lyndon B. Johnson signed the National Capital Transportation Act of 1965 approving the construction of a 25-mile (40 km) rapid transit system.

The NCTA negotiated with Virginia, Maryland and the District of Columbia to form a new regional entity. The authority was created by an interstate compact, a special type of contract or agreement between one or more states. Pursuant to the Compact Clause of the U.S. Constitution, any such compact must be approved by Congress. After the Washington Metropolitan Area Transit Authority Compact was approved by the Maryland General Assembly in 1965, and passed through the Virginia General Assembly and Congress in 1966, WMATA was founded on February 20, 1967.

As a government agency, the compact grants WMATA sovereign immunity by all three jurisdictions in which it operates, and except for certain limited exceptions, the authority cannot be successfully sued unless it waives immunity. Under the provisions of the compact, the authority is legally incorporated in the District of Columbia, where WMATA maintains its headquarters.

=== Metro construction and operation ===
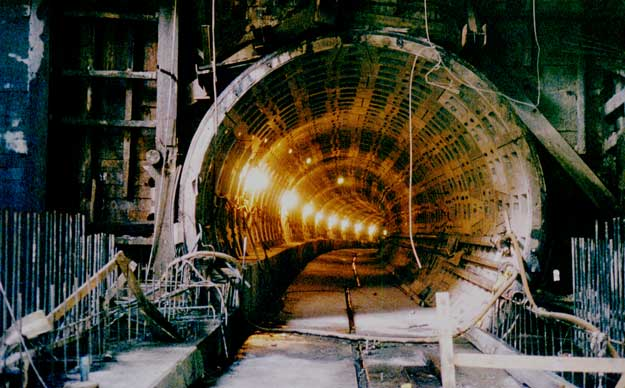
Construction of the Metro at Navy Yard, August 1989

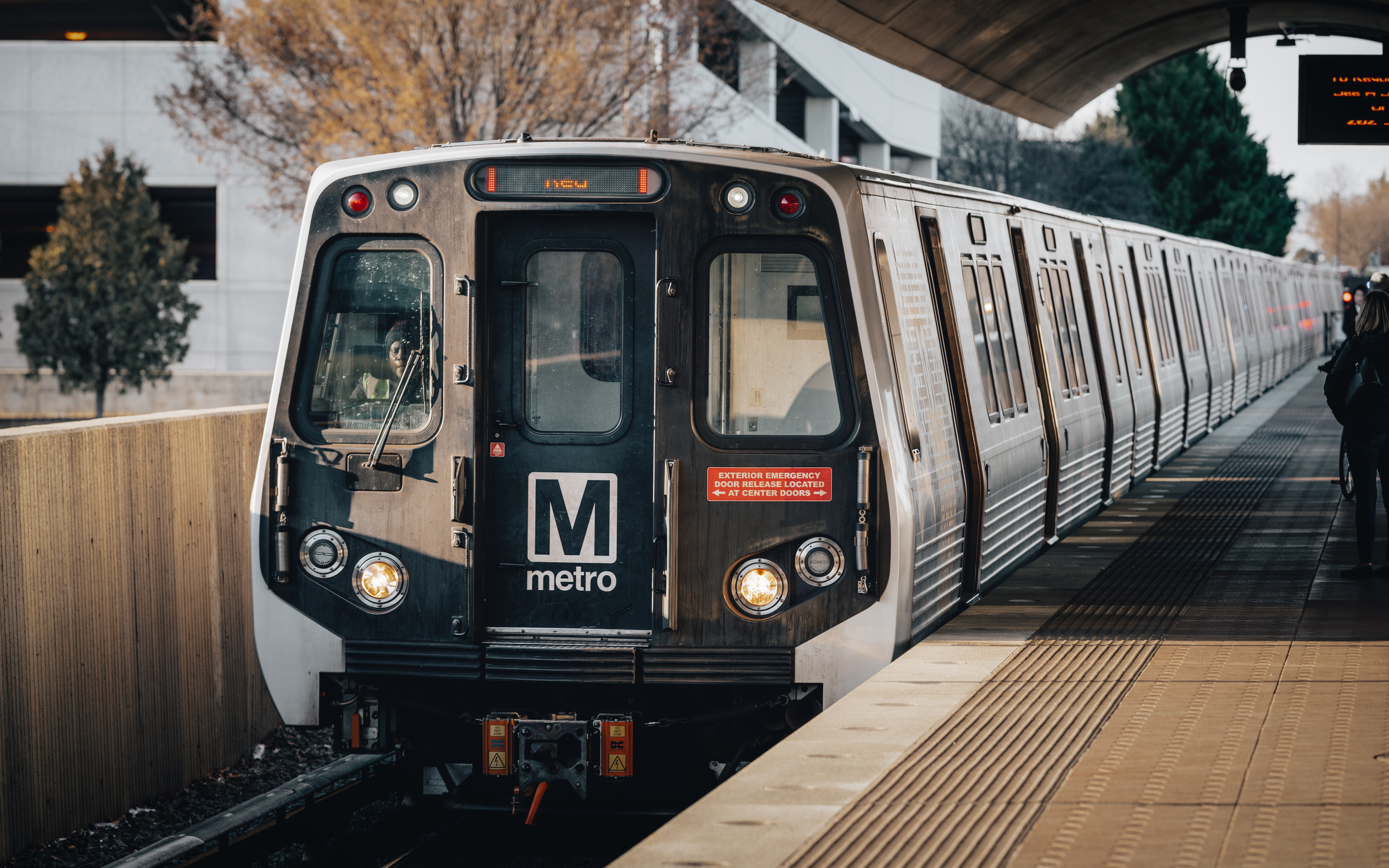
7000-series railcar, the newest in the Metro fleet, pictured at Twinbrook in January 2023

WMATA broke ground for its train system in 1969. The first portion of the Metrorail system opened March 27, 1976, connecting Farragut North to Rhode Island Avenue on the Red Line. The 103 miles (166 km) of the original 83-station system was completed on January 13, 2001, with the opening of Green Line's segment from Anacostia to Branch Avenue.

WMATA's bus system is a successor to four privately owned bus companies. While WMATA's original compact provided only for rail service, by 1970 the need for reliable bus services to connect passengers to rail stations led to calls for authority to overhaul the entire bus system as well. The compact was amended in 1971, allowing the authority to operate buses and take over bus companies. After months of negotiation with Chalk failed to produce an agreed price, on January 14, 1973, WMATA condemned D.C. Transit and its sister company, the Washington, Virginia and Maryland Coach Company and acquired their assets for $38.2 million. On February 4, it acquired the Alexandria, Barcroft and Washington Transit Company, which operated in Northern Virginia, and the WMA Transit Company of Prince George's County for $4.5 million. While AB&W and WMA Transit were in better financial condition than D.C. Transit, their owners did not wish to compete with a publicly owned bus system, and requested a takeover.

In 1979, an organization known as Metro 2001, Inc., planned to write a history of the development of the Metro system for WMATA using such documents as Congressional hearing transcripts, correspondence, and maps. This Metro History Project was abandoned in 1985, and materials that had been collected up until that point (1930–1984) were donated to George Washington University. As of 2018, this collection of materials was under the care of GWU's Special Collections Research Center, located in the Estelle and Melvin Gelman Library.

In 1998, Congress changed the name of the Washington National Airport to the Ronald Reagan Washington National Airport, though the law did not allocate money to implement the name change. As a result, WMATA did not change the name of the National Airport station (which never included the full name of the airport). In response to repeated inquiries from Republican congressmen that the station be renamed, WMATA stated that stations are renamed only at the request of the local jurisdiction. Since both Arlington County and the District of Columbia were controlled by Democrats, the name change was blocked. Finally, in 2001, Congress made changing the station's name a condition of further federal funding.

=== Great Recession ===
In response to a demand for immediate repayment of a $43 million debt, WMATA sought a temporary restraining order against the KBC Bank Group. KBC claimed that the WMATA was in technical default of a contract following the collapse of American International Group, which had guaranteed the loan that KBC made to WMATA in 2002. The contract involved the sale to KBC of WMATA's rail cars, which were then leased back to WMATA. The transit agency asked for an injunction from the U.S. District Court for the District of Columbia on October 29, 2008.

After three days of negotiations in federal court, Judge Rosemary M. Collyer announced a settlement on November 14, 2008. WMATA had 14 similar lease agreements with other financial institutions when the KBC case went to trial. Waivers were requested from the banks to allow WMATA time to replace AIG with another insurer or guarantees by the federal government.

In 2009, WMATA issued two new series of municipal bonds bringing its total outstanding bonds to $390.9 million, as of June 30, 2010. This includes $55 million of Build America Bonds issued in 2009 under the American Recovery and Reinvestment Act of 2009 that are partially funded by the federal government.

However, most of the system's debt is financed directly by each local jurisdiction. In addition, WMATA was authorized to receive $202 million in grants from the federal government for American Recovery and Reinvestment Act projects. The funds are spent in 30 projects which include information technology, facilities maintenance, and vehicles and vehicle parts.

On January 14, 2010, general manager John B. Catoe announced his resignation from Metro, effective April 2, 2010. He was replaced on April 3, 2010, by interim general manager Richard Sarles. Sarles became one of three finalists interviewing for the permanent position, and later became the permanent general manager on January 27, 2011. Jack Requa became the interim general manager upon Sarles' retirement January 16, 2015.

In November 2015, WMATA announced that it would hire Paul J. Wiedefeld as its next general manager. During his tenure, Wiedefeld sought to prioritize transit safety over rail service, believing it would restore public confidence in the transit system. He was also credited with overhauling the Metro's infrastructure while setting the stage for more-reliable and safer service in the future. On January 18, 2022, Wiedefeld announced that he would retire as the general manager of WMATA, effective July 18. On May 16, 2022, after WMATA announced that half of its train operators had lacked retraining and testing required for recertification, Wiedefeld announced that he would resign as general manager effective immediately, two months ahead of his scheduled retirement.

In May 2022, Randy Clarke was selected as the next general manager and CEO of WMATA. Clarke has been praised in the media and by local politicians for improving the Washington Metro during his tenure, with increased ridership, reliability and fall in crime levels. In 2024, a Washington Post poll of riders gave the system the highest approval ratings for over a decade. In April 2025, Clarke's contract was extended until 2029.

=== Infill stations ===
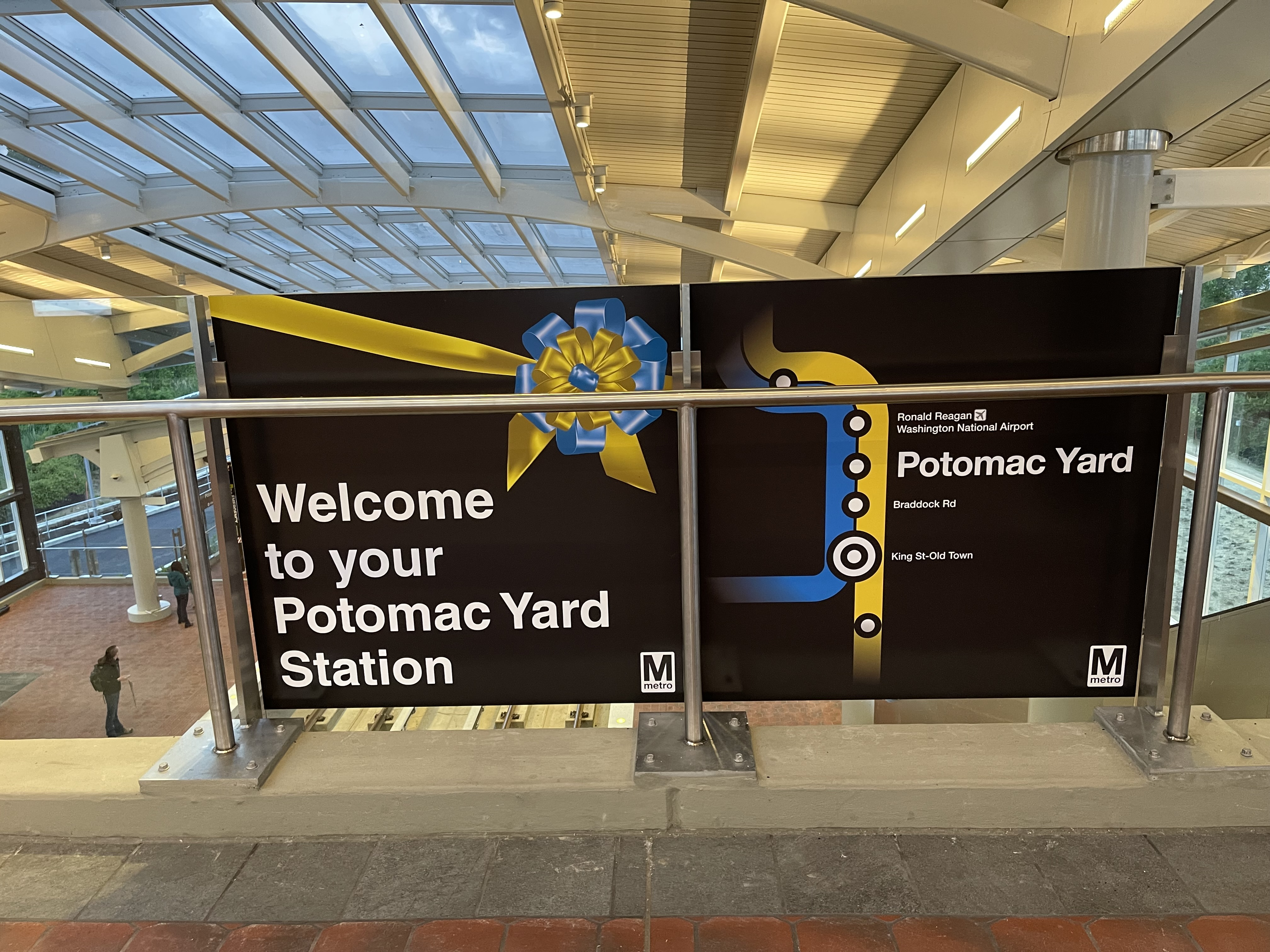
Opening day of the Potomac Yard station, the second infill station built on the Washington Metro

Just 2 of WMATA's 98 stops are in-fill stations.

NoMa-Gallaudet on the Red Line, opened in 2004, filled a gap between Union Station and Brookland-CUA. The station's planned name was New York Avenue, but it opened as "New York Avenue-Florida Avenue-Gallaudet University" and changed to its present name in 2011.

The other is Potomac Yard on the southern end of the Blue and Yellow Lines, between Braddock Road and Ronald Reagan Washington National Airport stations. It opened on May 19, 2023, after three years of construction.

== Organization ==
=== Board of directors ===
WMATA's original board of directors included six voting members and six alternates. In response to the Passenger Rail Investment and Improvement Act of 2008, the WMATA Compact was amended on August 19, 2009, to allow the federal government, through the Secretary of Transportation, to appoint up to two voting and two alternate members. As of 2018, Virginia, Maryland, the District, and the federal government had each appointed two voting and two alternate members.

Board members serve without pay, but may be reimbursed for actual expenses. The board appoints a general manager as CEO to supervise the day-to-day operation of the authority. Under the terms of the "Procedures for WMATA Board of Directors", none of the individual board members, including the chairman, have any power to act regarding the operations of the authority or to issue instructions to the general manager or employees; only the entire board as a body has the power to instruct the general manager. It states, "The authority of the Board of Directors is vested in the collective body and not in its individual Members. Accordingly, the Board, in establishing or providing any policies, orders, guidance, or instructions to the General Manager or WMATA staff, shall act as a body. No Member individually shall direct or supervise the General Manager or any WMATA employee or contractor."

The board approves WMATA's annual budget. In fiscal year 2019, the budget was about $3.1 billion; revenues included: capital contributions, 40.3%; passenger revenues; 23.2%; local jurisdiction operations funding, 31.7%; interest income, 3.5%; advertising revenue, 1.6%; rental revenue, 0.9%; and other sources, 0.2%.

As of July 2018, the WMATA board had four standing committees: Executive, Finance and Capital, Capital & Strategic Planning, and Safety and Operation.

The position of board chairman rotates between the three jurisdictions. Article III Section 5 of the Compact specifies the method of appointment. The Compact prohibits WMATA from paying board members. However, Maryland pays its voting board members $20,000 per year and Virginia pays $50 per meeting. The District of Columbia does not compensate its board members.

Jurisdiction	Director	Status	Appointed
District of Columbia (appointed by the Council of the District of Columbia)	Tracey Hadden Loh	Principal Director and 2nd Vice Chair	November 2021
District of Columbia (appointed by the Council of the District of Columbia)	Vacant	Principal Director	
District of Columbia (appointed by the Council of the District of Columbia)	Spring Worth	Alternate Director	December 2022
District of Columbia (appointed by the Council of the District of Columbia)	Vacant	Alternate Director	
Federal government (appointed by the Secretary of Transportation):	Sarah Kline	Principal Director	September 2021
Federal government (appointed by the Secretary of Transportation):	Kamiliah Martin-Proctor	Principal Director	September 2021
Federal government (appointed by the Secretary of Transportation):	April Rai	Alternate Director	December 2022
Federal government (appointed by the Secretary of Transportation):	Bryna Helfer	Alternate Director	September 2021
Maryland (appointed by the Washington Suburban Transit Commission):	Joe McAndrew	Principal Director and 1st Vice Chair	April 2023
Maryland (appointed by the Washington Suburban Transit Commission):	Don Drummer	Principal Director	May 2021
Maryland (appointed by the Washington Suburban Transit Commission):	Thomas Graham	Alternate Director	June 2019
Maryland (appointed by the Washington Suburban Transit Commission):	Michael Goldman	Alternate Director	December 2022
Virginia (appointed by the Northern Virginia Transportation Commission):	Paul C. Smedberg	Principal Director and Chairman	January 2019
Virginia (appointed by the Northern Virginia Transportation Commission):	Matt Letourneau	Principal Director	March 2019
Virginia (appointed by the Northern Virginia Transportation Commission):	Canek Aguirre	Alternate Director	January 2020
Virginia (appointed by the Northern Virginia Transportation Commission):	Walter Alcorn	Alternate Director	January 2020

On February 17, 2011, outgoing 2010–11 WMATA Board Chairman Peter Benjamin announced he was leaving the board and would be replaced by former Congressman Michael D. Barnes. The new Governance Committee of the WMATA board, which at the time was chaired by Mary Hynes, held its first meeting and established a work plan to develop a new relationship between the board and WMATA management. The committee will draft new bylaws that will better define the role and term of the WMATA Board Chairman. The Governance Committee will also draft a code of conduct for board members.

=== Management ===
The general manager is the chief executive officer of WMATA and leads all staff except that the general counsel, inspector general, and board secretary, who report directly to the board. WMATA has a chief safety officer which reports to the general manager. The safety of the system is independently reviewed by the Tri-State Oversight Committee and the National Transportation Safety Board. On March 4, 2010, the Federal Transit Administration issued an Audit of the State Safety Oversight (SSO) program overseeing Metro which criticised the SSO as being underfunded and poorly trained. In response, Virginia, Maryland and the District of Columbia have increased their SSO funding and training for their employees responsible for safety oversight at Metro.

Jackson Graham, a retired general in the Army Corps of Engineers who supervised the planning and initial construction of the Metrorail system, was the first general manager. Graham retired in 1976, and was replaced by Theodore C. Lutz. Richard S. Page, head of the Urban Mass Transportation Administration (the name of the Federal Transit Administration until 1991), took over as general manager of WMATA in 1979. Page resigned in 1983, amid increasing financial difficulties for WMATA. and was replaced by Carmen E. Turner, who served for seven years. Former New York City Transit Authority chief, David L. Gunn, took over as head of WMATA in 1991, followed by Lawrence G. Reuter in 1994, and Richard A. White in 1996.

White led efforts to improve accountability and dialogue with passengers during 2005. This included independent audits, town hall meetings, online chats with White and other management officials, and improved signage in stations. White had three more years in his contract to work for Metro, but had come under fire for mismanagement; however, he was also "widely credited with saving the Metrobus system from collapse and with keeping Metro running during the terrorist attacks of Sept. 11, 2001." Despite these efforts, however, the board of directors dismissed White on January 11, 2006. Dan Tangherlini replaced White as interim general manager, effective February 16, 2006.

Tangherlini was considered a leading candidate for Metro's top job on a permanent basis before he resigned to work as D.C. City Administrator under Mayor Adrian Fenty. On November 6, 2006, Tangherlini was replaced as interim general manager by Jack Requa, Metro's chief bus manager. John B. Catoe Jr., who was previously the deputy chief executive officer of the Los Angeles County Metropolitan Transportation Authority, became the agency's eighth permanent general manager on January 25, 2007. He resigned three years later following the deadliest crash in the Metrorail system's history.

On April 3, 2010, the board of directors appointed Richard Sarles, former executive director of New Jersey Transit, as interim general manager. Sarles, 65, was offered the position of permanent general manager but declined the appointment at that time. However, on January 27, 2011, the Board announced that Sarles accepted the position as WMATA's permanent general manager.

With Sarles' retirement, the post of general manager was filled by Paul Wiedefeld on November 30, 2015.

On January 18, 2022, WMATA announced that Paul Wiedefeld would be retiring from Metro in 6 months and WMATA's board of directors will be conducting a national search for his replacement. On May 10, 2022, WMATA announced that current president and CEO of Capital Metropolitan Transportation Authority Randy Clarke as its new general manager and CEO beginning in summer 2022. On May 16, 2022, Wiedefeld announced he will retire early with Andy Off being the interim general manager.

=== Regional coordination ===
The agency's charter directs WMATA to create a unified regional transit system by coordinating other public and private agencies within its jurisdiction. Examples of its coordination efforts include: reducing unnecessary, duplicate services by other local transit systems, providing "SmarTrip" farecards for buses operated by other local transit agencies, and adding local bus schedules and commuter rail routes (such as Maryland's MARC and Virginia's VRE) to WMATA's online "Trip Planner" guide.

=== Transit Police ===
Congress established the Metro Transit Police Department (MTPD) on June 4, 1976. MTPD police officers have jurisdiction and arrest powers for crimes that occur throughout the 1,500-square-mile (3,900 km^{2}) Transit Zone that includes Maryland, Virginia, and the District of Columbia.

=== Inspector general ===
The Office of Inspector General was originally authorized by Board Resolution 2006–18, approved by the WMATA Board on April 20, 2006. With the amendments enacted on August 19, 2009, the Office of Inspector General became part of the WMATA Compact. This change was one of the requirements for the $1.5 billion federal grant offered by the Passenger Rail Investment and Improvement Act of 2008. Helen Lew became the Metro's first Inspector General on May 14, 2007, establishing the WMATA Office of Inspector General. Her appointment by the board of directors replaced the former Auditor General's Office. On April 17, 2017, Geoffrey Cherrington replaced Lew, who retired, as Inspector General, Unlike the Auditor General, the Inspector General and their office report directly to the Board and are organizationally independent of WMATA management.

== Services ==
=== Metrorail ===
Scale map of the Metrorail system as of 2023

Since opening in 1976, the Metrorail network has grown to include six lines, 98 stations, and 129 miles (208 km) of track. As of 2023, it is the second-busiest rapid transit system in the United States in average daily ridership after the New York City Subway The record for daily ridership was 1.12 million on January 20, 2009, the day of Barack Obama's first Presidential Inauguration, followed by the Women's March on January 21, 2017, with 1,001,613 trips. In 2016, Metrorail had nearly 180 million trips. Fares vary based on the distance traveled and the time of day. Riders can enter and exit the system by using a proximity card known as SmarTrip, or by using contactless payments via credit card, debit card, or smart device.

SmarTrip cards can also be used on a smartphone through Apple Pay and Google Pay. Magnetic stripe tickets stopped being accepted on March 6, 2016. Metrorail's frequency of service and fares vary depending on the available funding, the particular transit line, and the distance traveled.

Metro offers parking for commuters at 44 Metrorail stations. Most lots are on a first-come, first-served basis and fill up quickly each day. Thirty-six stations offer reserved parking, with customers purchasing permits to park in specified spaces. Four Metrorail stations (Greenbelt, Huntington, Franconia–Springfield, and Wiehle-Reston East) have spaces reserved for multi-day parking for up to ten days. Parking fees are paid by SmarTrip card or credit card. Cash payments are not accepted for parking fees.

=== Metrobus ===
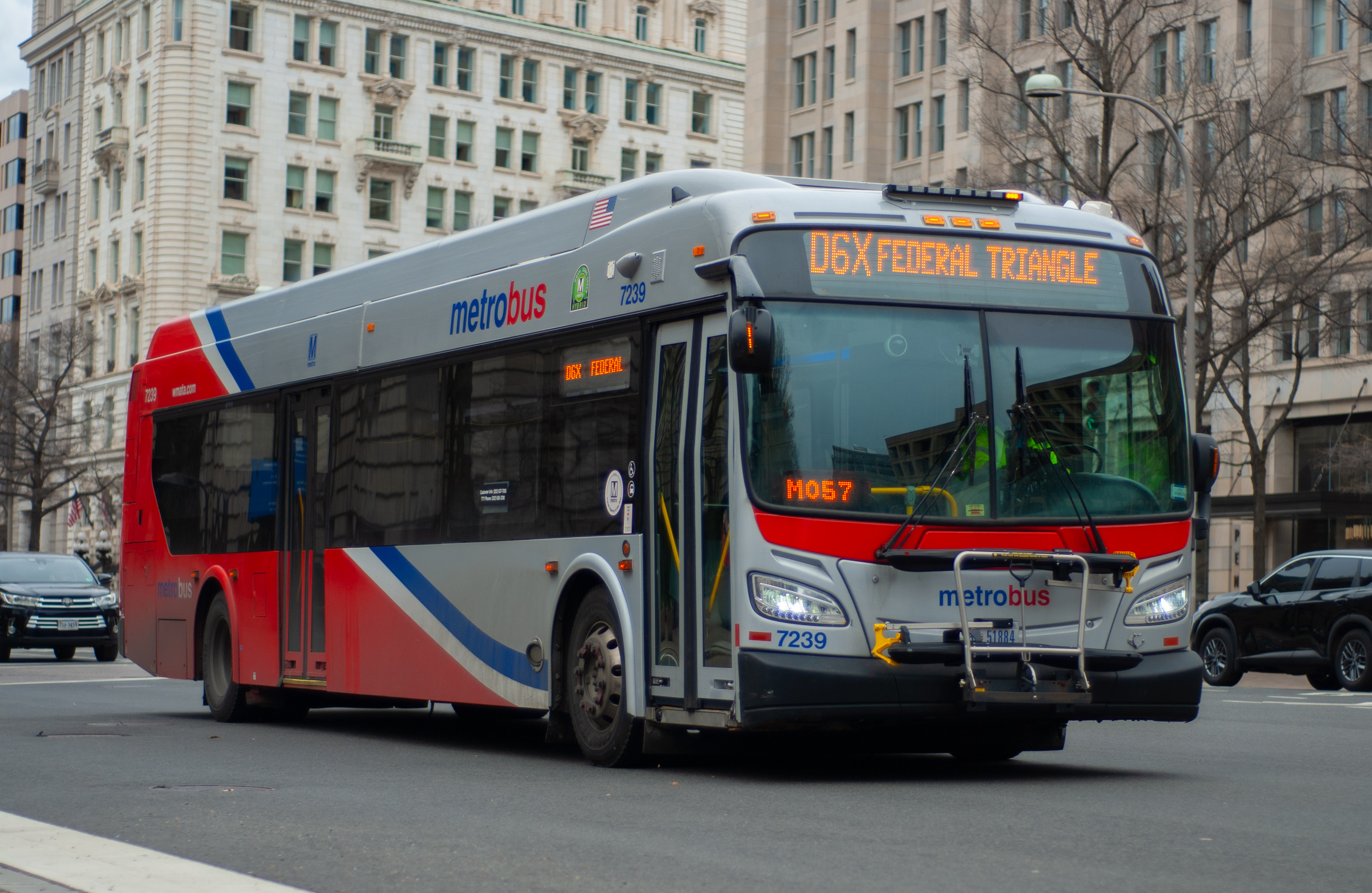
Route D6X Metrobus on Pennsylvania Avenue

Metrobus' fleet consists of 1,505 buses covering an area of 1,500 square miles (3,900 km^{2}) in Washington, D.C., Maryland, and Virginia. There are 269 bus routes serving 11,129 stops, including 2,554 bus shelters. Metrobus had 130.8 million trips in 2016. On a typical weekday, it provides more than 400,000 trips.

The route numbering represents its region of operation. To differ the regions numbering system, bus routes are prefixed based on the first letter of the primary jurisdiction they run in. Buses within Washington DC that serve downtown are prefixed with a D, while buses that primarily serve outer parts of the city are prefixed with C. In Virginia, buses in Arlington and Alexandria are prefixed with A, while Fairfax City, Fairfax County, and Falls Church buses are prefixed with F. In Maryland, M is used for Montgomery County buses and P for Prince George's County. Buses that cross between the areas are given the letter they spend the most time in.

=== Metroway ===

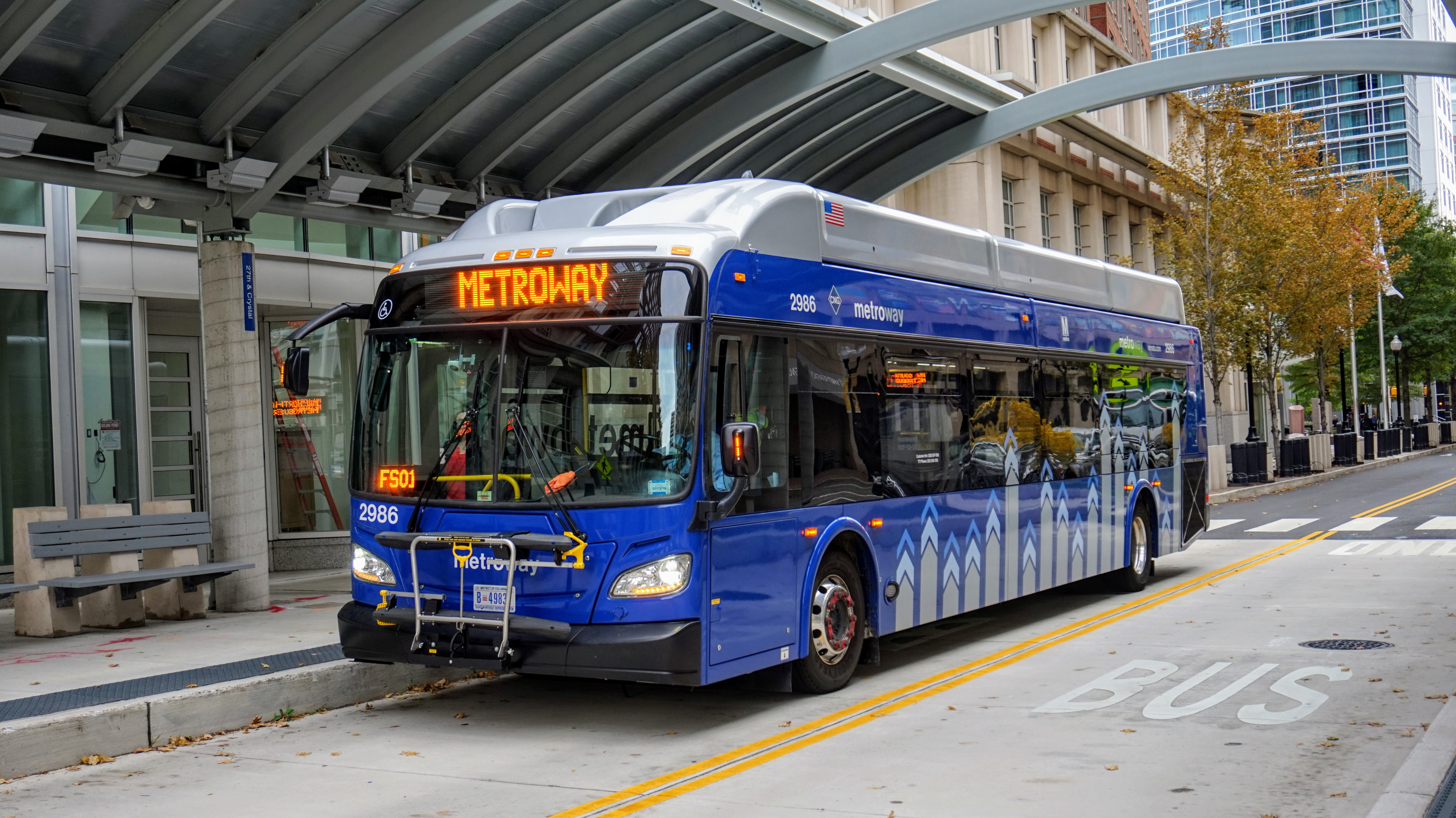
Metroway bus in Crystal City

Metroway is a bus rapid transit (BRT) service that began on August 24, 2014. The first phase is the Crystal City/Potomac Yard Transitway, which operates on Route 1 in Arlington and Alexandria, Virginia. It is a 5-mile (8.0 km) corridor with 33 platforms and 20 stations located between Pentagon City and Braddock Road. The first 0.8 mile segment in Alexandria runs on a transit lane only. The Arlington County segment began construction in the summer of 2014 and opened April 17, 2016. Metroway originally operated between the Braddock Road and Crystal City stations and was expanded to Pentagon City in April 2016. The service features dedicated bus lanes, transit signal priority, real-time information, custom designed shelters and stations, as well as near-level boarding at station platforms. A Metroway fare costs the same as Metrobus.

=== MetroAccess ===
MetroAccess is a paratransit service that WMATA provides through private contractors. It began operation in May 1994 and since that time annual ridership has grown from 200,000 to more than 2.4 million passengers. MetroAccess operates 365 days a year, providing door-to-door, shared rides reserved from one to seven days in advance. It is now the sixth-largest paratransit service in the United States with a fleet of more than 600 vehicles and more than 1,000 employees. WMATA staff determines eligibility to use the service in response to written applications. The cost per passenger for MetroAccess is significantly higher than its fixed-route counterparts, and Metro has worked to provide as many opportunities to encourage and facilitate the use of fixed-route transit by eligible individuals.

== Art in transit ==
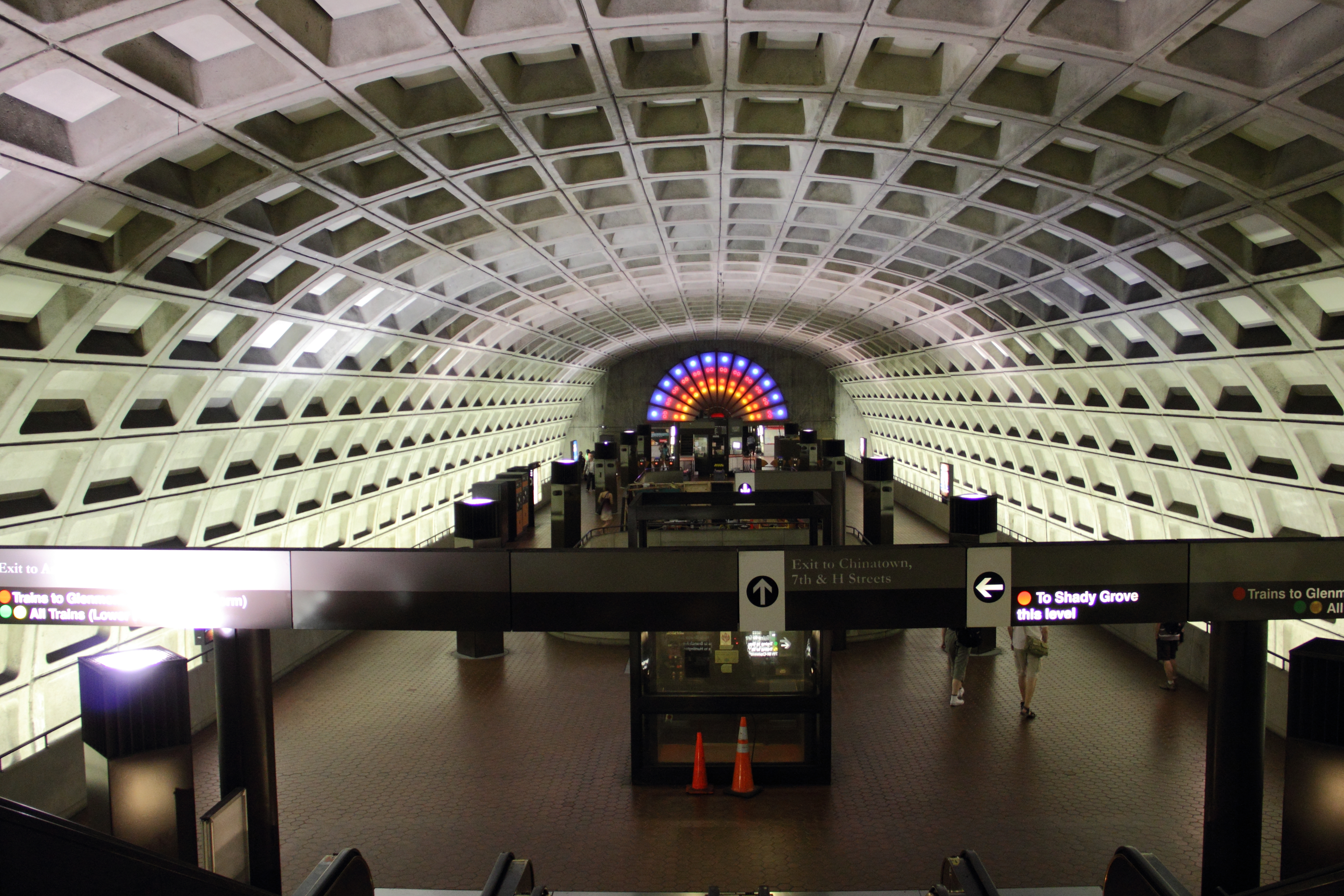
The Glory of Chinese Descendants (2000) by Foon Sham at Gallery Place station, an artwork sponsored by the Art in Transit Program

The Art in Transit Program includes a variety of public art at Metro stations and facilities, and also supports live performances on Metro properties. As of 2026, 44 Metrorail stations have featured public art, including temporary and permanent installations. The Art in Transit Program began participating in the Poetry Society of America's Poetry in Motion program in 2021, placing excerpts of poetry on advertising spaces at Metrorail stations and inside Metrobus vehicles.

Funding for the art comes from several sources, including local governments, the WMATA art program, the Federal Transit Administration, and local art groups. Some pieces are gifts or on loan. WMATA has solicited feedback from riders concerning art in the stations and to guide choices on future installations.

The designers of the original Metrorail system, especially architect Harry Weese, objected heavily to public art in Metrorail stations. Metro began a series of temporary public art installations in the 1980s, and the current Arts in Transit program was founded in 1997. Notable permanent artworks in the Metrorail system include The Glory of Chinese Descendants by Foon Sham at Gallery Place station and Penguin Rush Hour at Silver Spring station.

== Funding ==
Fares and other revenue fund 57.6% of the Metro's daily operations while state and local governments fund the remaining 42.4%. Since the Metro's inception, the federal government has provided grants for 65% of the system's capital costs. Metrorail is unusual among major public transportation systems in having no dedicated source of funding. Instead, each year WMATA must ask each local jurisdiction to contribute funding, which is determined by a formula that equally considers three factors:

1. population density, as of the most recent United States census;
2. average weekday ridership;
3. number of stations in each jurisdiction.

Under this formula, the District of Columbia contributes the greatest amount (37.5%), followed by Prince George's County (20.8%), Montgomery County (16.6%), Fairfax County (13.5%), and 11.6% from all other jurisdictions. From time to time, a local jurisdiction will agree to subsidize a specific fare, with the jurisdiction funding the cost of the subsidy in addition to its contribution under the above formula. For example, the District of Columbia subsidized the fares charged at Metrorail stations located in economically challenged neighborhoods.

The cost of Metrobus is allocated under a formula that considers the excess of expenses over revenues from specific bus routes. The cost of MetroAccess is allocated under a different formula, which divides MetroAccess costs by the number of trips requested by riders who reside in each jurisdiction.

In 2004 the Brookings Institution released a report entitled "Deficits by Design" that found the agency's serious budgetary challenges owe in large part to its problematic revenue base. Most notably, Brookings found that WMATA's extraordinary lack of dedicated funding sources has necessitated an over-reliance on annually appropriated support that makes the agency vulnerable to perennial financial crises. As a result, the region's political and business leaders created a committee to look at new ways to fund the system, including some type of dedicated tax.

Title VI of the Passenger Rail Investment and Improvement Act of 2008, signed into law by President George W. Bush on October 16, 2008, authorized a grant of $1.5 billion over a 10-year period for Metrorail capital maintenance projects. The grant was contingent upon the establishment of dedicated revenue sources for the Metro by the Compact jurisdictions. An amendment to the Metro's Compact on August 19, 2009, added the requirement for payments "from dedicated funding sources" by the Compact's participating jurisdictions. In June 2010, Virginia Governor Bob McDonnell threatened to withhold Virginia's WMATA funding unless the composition of WMATA's board is modified to allow Virginia's Governor to appoint two of the four Virginia seats, instead of the localities. On June 17, 2010, Federal Transit Administrator Peter Rogoff required a formal commitment from Virginia to match its share of the federal funds if the federal funding is to continue. On July 1, 2010, the WMATA Board of Directors agreed to provide matching funds without regard to McDonnell's request for Board seats. Based on this agreement, the federal funds were reconfirmed, and WMATA was able to proceed with a contract to purchase 428 new Metrorail cars. McDonnell pressed for a Board seat again in 2011, and used his amendatory veto authority to amend the 2010–11 budget to require the NVTC to appoint someone of the Governor's choosing to fill one of the NVTC seats on the WMATA Board.

In the course of considering a continuing resolution for federal fiscal year 2011, the U.S. House of Representatives sought to defund all "earmarks" including the $150 million annual installment toward the $1.5 billion in federal matching funds. On February 16, 2011, Rep. Gerry Connolly (D-Va.) offered an amendment to reallocate $150 million from farm subsidy payments to meet this obligation, but the amendment was ruled out of order. The suspension of the federal appropriation also calls into question the matching funds from the individual jurisdictions for capital projects. On March 1, 2010, Republican Virginia Governor Bob McDonnell wrote to Congress urging the continuation of the federal funds. The continuing resolution for the remainder of 2011 ultimately included the federal matching funds.

The 57% funding of WMATA from fares and other revenue compares with New York City's Metropolitan Transportation Authority which receives 53% of its funding from fares and car tolls. The Metropolitan Atlanta Rapid Transit Authority receives of 31.8% of its funding from fares.

In an effort to gain revenues, WMATA has started to allow retail ventures in Metrorail stations. WMATA has authorized DVD-rental vending machines and ticket booths for the Old Town Trolley Tours and is seeking additional retail tenants.

== Controversy ==
=== Safety ===
In recent years, WMATA has drawn criticism for a neglect of safety in both its rail and bus systems. Problems include failures within the system designed to prevent train collisions and escalators failing or breaking apart while in service. The National Transportation Safety Board (NTSB) has recommended that WMATA invest $1 billion in needed safety improvements. A December 2008 report by the WMATA Inspector General documented that Metro's System Safety and Risk Management Office was bypassed when changes were made to Metrorail's operating procedures, even though that office's review and approval was required as a matter of policy. On June 22, 2009, two Metrorail trains collided between the Takoma and Fort Totten Metro stations, killing nine. In February 2011, the National Transportation Safety Board conducted a public hearing during which witnesses testified about problems with the safety culture at WMATA. The NTSB's final report on the accident commented that "[t]he failure of WMATA engineers and technicians or managers to properly address track circuit anomalies is symptomatic of the larger safety culture issues within the organization."

Safety concerns have grown to the point that the region's Congressional delegation introduced the "National Metro Safety Act of 2011," which would establish federal safety standards for heavy rail mass transit systems. In response, WMATA is replacing its track control system and ordered an immediate inspection of all of its escalators. That inspection showed that over 10 percent of the escalators had faulty brakes.

The service state of elevators and escalators is of public concern. WMATA posts a webpage that is updated daily to notify users of elevator and escalator outages. WMATA makes track announcements that contradict industry safety standards, encouraging passengers to "stay clear of moving parts", encouraging people to stand on one side, and slowing the operating speed, which has the effect of encouraging walking on the escalators.

Closed-circuit television cameras monitor every Metrobus and every Metrorail station.

=== Discrimination ===
In 1990, Christine Townsend sued WMATA in the Washington federal district court on the basis of sexual discrimination. She won, with the court noting in the outcome of Townsend v. Washington Metro. Area Transit Auth. that the WMATA explanation had "many unexplained inconsistencies, irregularities, and holes".

Former Metro workers say that WMATA consistently passes over non-black applicants or workers for employment or promotion.

In May 2015, the WMATA board voted to ban advocacy advertising after the American Freedom Defense Initiative sought to purchase advertisements in five subway stations and on twenty buses depicting Muhammad.

== Future expansion ==
There has been speculation about an extension of the Green Line northward to Baltimore's BWI Airport. There was also talk of extending the Green Line either to National Harbor or to White Plains via Waldorf. An extension from Franconia/Springfield to Fort Belvoir is also a possibility due to the Base Realignment and Closure process which relocated thousands of area defense jobs at Fort Belvoir in 2012. While there has been much discussion about all of these extensions, none are in any official planning stage. There have also been plans to extend the Orange Line to Centreville and Bowie.

Regarding Metrobus improvements, former general manager Sarles reported, "Bus service will benefit from new technology that integrates fare box, destination signage and next bus systems to improve our reliability and customer information delivery. And, we will begin work in certain priority bus corridors that will deliver faster travel times for bus customers. Additionally, I look forward to working with the District of Columbia on potential bus rapid transit service improvements, such as curb running and signal preference to make bus service even more attractive, efficient, and an even more powerful antidote to traffic congestion."

== Operational ==
=== Energy efficiency initiatives ===
WMATA reached an agreement in 2013 with the sustainable lighting division at Philips Electronics North America to switch to LEDs, upgrading more than 13,000 lighting fixtures at no upfront cost. WMATA and Philips agreed to a ten-year maintenance contract through the $2 million savings the LEDs will provide each year.

=== MICC ===
WMATA's Integrated Command and Communications Center (MICC) opened in 2023 in the Eisenhower East neighborhood of Alexandria, Virginia. The building is 14 stories tall, designed to support 1400 employees. The MICC is the system's technology hub, including the data center, cybersecurity operations, bus and rail video teams, communications, and administrative support.

=== New Carrollton offices ===
In March 2023, WMATA opened a new office building in New Carrollton, Maryland to consolidate the location of several departments. The facility includes the customer service call centers, MetroAccess and the headquarters for the Metro Transit Police.

== See also ==
- List of railroads in Washington, D.C.
- DC Circulator
- DC Streetcar

== Bibliography ==
- Schrag, Zachary (2006). The Great Society Subway: A History of the Washington Metro. Baltimore, MD: Johns Hopkins University Press. ISBN 0-8018-8246-X.
- "Washington Metropolitan Area Transit Authority Compact" (PDF). WMATA.
- "Comprehensive Annual Financial Report for the Fiscal Year Ended June 30, 2010" (PDF). WMATA. December 21, 2010. Archived from the original (PDF) on January 27, 2024.
- "Comprehensive Annual Financial Report for the Fiscal Years Ended June 30, 2017 and 2016" (PDF). WMATA. October 26, 2017. Archived from the original (PDF) on September 17, 2024.
- "Comprehensive Annual Financial Report for the Fiscal Years Ended June 30, 2021 and 2022" (PDF). WMATA.
- "Comprehensive Annual Financial Report for the fiscal years ended June 30, 2025 and 2024" (PDF). WMATA.
