= David Lloyd Kreeger =

American art philanthropist

- Born: 1909
- Died: 1990 (aged 80–81); Washington D.C.
- Occupation: philanthropist
- Spouse: Carmen J. Matanzo
- Children: Carol & Peter Kreeger

David Lloyd Kreeger (1909–1990) was an American art philanthropist, recipient of the 1990 National Medal of Arts Award.

== Personal life ==
Kreeger was born in 1909 to Jewish parents who emigrated from Russia, settling in Highland Park, New Jersey, where they operated a small grocery store

He died in Washington DC at the age of 81, following a battle with neck cancer. He lived on Foxhall Road N. W. with his wife Carmen nee Matanzo y Jaramillo (1909–2003) since 1968. The couple had two children: a girl, Carol, and a boy, Peter. The mansion was designed by architect Philip Johnson and became a showcase for his collection. It cost $1.9 million to build.

== Art lover ==
Kreeger purchased works of art because he loved them, not for their potential investment opportunities. He explained "I bought it for love and was lucky. Art that embodies the creative spirit of man transcends the value of money." His art collection contained works of the most famous artists of the 19th and 20th centuries, including Degas, Renoir, Van Gogh, Picasso and Kandinsky. His art collection was made open to the public in 1994 when his former home opened as The Kreeger Museum.

== Business ==
As well as being an art patron, Kreeger was successful in his business accomplishments. For example, he was President, Chairman and CEO of GEICO, as well as President and Chairman of the Corcoran Gallery of Art. He began his career as a lawyer in a private practice in Newark, then moved on to join the team at the Department of Agriculture's legal department. From there he moved to the Department of the Interior and in 1941 he became Special Assistant to the Attorney General. He remained at the Justice Department until 1946, at which point he went to Washington resuming his legal role in a private practice.

== Charitable endeavors ==
Together with his wife, Kreeger gave both time and money to “developing artistic talent,” sponsoring university art competitions, and founding the Kreeger Creativity Awards at Catholic University. Further, he gave his name to three buildings which he helped make happen through his generosity: the Kreeger Theater at Arena Stage, the Kreeger Music Building at American University and the Kreeger Auditorium at the Corcoran Gallery of Art. He also contributed to the National Symphony Orchestra, Washington Opera, the Corcoran Gallery of Art, and the John F. Kennedy Center for the Performing Arts.

Kreeger also served on the boards of the Arena Stage, Dumbarton Oaks, Georgetown University, the Peabody Institute of Music and the National Gallery; a trustee emeritus of American University and a National Vice President of the American Jewish Committee. Kreeger also served for many years as President of the Board of Trustees of the Washington Opera. The proscenium stage of Arena Stage is named in his honor.

== Education ==
Kreeger graduated from Rutgers in 1929 and was inducted into the Rutgers Hall of Distinguished Alumni in 1988. He graduated from Harvard Law School in 1932 with High Honors. During his time at Harvard, he was editor of The Law Review.

== Kreeger Awards ==
The David Lloyd Kreeger Awards in the Fine Arts were awarded between 1986 and 1991. Kreeger created them to “generate interest in creative work among students at Georgetown University.” There were seven awards for excellence awarded in each of the seven fields in Georgetown’s Fine Arts Department curriculum (drawing, painting, printmaking, sculpture, art history, music, and drama). A Special Purchase Award for Excellence was also created.
