= National Capital Transportation Agency =

National Capital Transportation Act of 1960
- Long title: An Act to aid in the development of a unified and integrated system of transportation for the National Capital region; to create a temporary National Capital Transportation Agency; to authorize the creation of a National Capital Transportation Corporation; to authorize negotiation to create an interstate transportation agency; and for other purposes.
- Enacted by: the 86th United States Congress

Citations
- Public law: Pub. L. 86–669
- Statutes at Large: 74 Stat. 537

Legislative history
- Introduced in the House as H.R. 11135 by Joel Broyhill (R–VA) on March 14, 1960; Committee consideration by House District of Columbia; Passed the House on June 27, 1960; Passed the Senate on June 27, 1960; Reported by the joint conference committee on June 30, 1960; agreed to by the House on July 1, 1960 and by the Senate on July 1, 1960; Signed into law by President Dwight D. Eisenhower on July 14, 1960

The National Capital Transportation Agency (NCTA) was created in 1960 by an Act of Congress during the presidency of Dwight D. Eisenhower to comprehensively plan different modes of transportation in the Washington, D.C. area. John F. Kennedy appointed Darwin Stolzenbach as administrator of the NCTA, which laid the groundwork for the Washington Metro System.

In 1967 the NCTA was abolished and its functions, duties, property, and records were transferred to the Washington Metropolitan Area Transit Authority.
