= Kandyan jewellery =

Kandyan jewellery comes from the hill capital of Ceylon or Sri Lanka. The Kandyan Kingdom lasted till 1815 resulting in the original sets of jewellery and designs still being preserved and worn by Kandyan families today.

Kandyan jewellery is handmade and was designed specifically for the royal families. It carries symbols of wealth, prosperity, grandeur, strength, well-being, solidarity, virtue, passion and valour. It is worn by women and men of royal or noble births. The jewellery is highly sought after today with important pieces such as the bridal-set having become collector's items.

== History of Kandyan jewellery ==
Goddess Pathini and God Dademunne were first wearing these jewellery designs. Later the members of royal families were presented with similar jewellery items leading to the origination of Kandyan jewellery sets. There is a drawing of the last Queen of Kandy in 1815 wearing Kandyan jewellery. She was King Rajasinghe's wife.

This tradition is still prevalent today to a certain degree through the practice of noble Kandyan families passing down their jewellery from one generation to another, from mother to daughter at weddings as part of dowry. Kandyan weddings are extravagant ceremonies with the jewellery taking a centre stage to highlight the Kandyan lineage of that family. This practice ensured that sets of Kandyan jewellery remained in selected circles of Kandyan families without being released to the outside world. Occasionally a family would decide to create a new set with modern designs and metals at which point they would inform other families of the release of the old set and introduce the newer trends to each other.

== Bridal set ==
Bridal sets are the most important pieces of Kandyan jewellery. They are handmade and consist of 26 pieces of jewellery that will adorn the bride from head to waist. The set normally consists of moon and sun, head chain, karapati throatlet, earrings, 3 pendants with chains, pethi necklace, agasti necklace, sarri (thick) bangles, gedi bangles and hawadiya (hip chain). Most of these jewellery items were made using five types of metals such as gold, silver, copper, lead, brass. All these items are gold-plated. The number "5" was considered an auspicious number and considered to make it 5 times stronger. These items are embedded with red and white Indian stones designed specially to go with the spectacular designs.

Bridal sets are rare with only a selected number of families possessing the entire set. These are collector's items.

== Sets of Kandyan jewellery ==
A set of jewellery consists of a necklace, head-dress and three throatlets.

- The three throatlets are:
  - (First) White swan displaying purity for the unmarried maidens,
  - (Middle) Red Makara pendant for the married ladies.
  - (Third) Red swan for the homecoming bride.
- The head-dress is a head and forehead chain for the bride known as nalalpati, a very precious item for the bride to be worn at an auspicious time.
- Pendants and chains:
  - 3 sisters pendants known as padakam, lucky pendants, elaborate design for evening wear.
  - Makara pendants with chains and earrings, three being an auspicious number to bring good luck.
  - Agasti set, a rare stone in gold for daytime wear with saree or dresses.

These stones are only found in Sri Lanka; worn by young and old both displaying the Agasti stone in gold goblets. A set consists of an Agasti necklace, earrings and two bangles.

== Other Common Jewellery ==
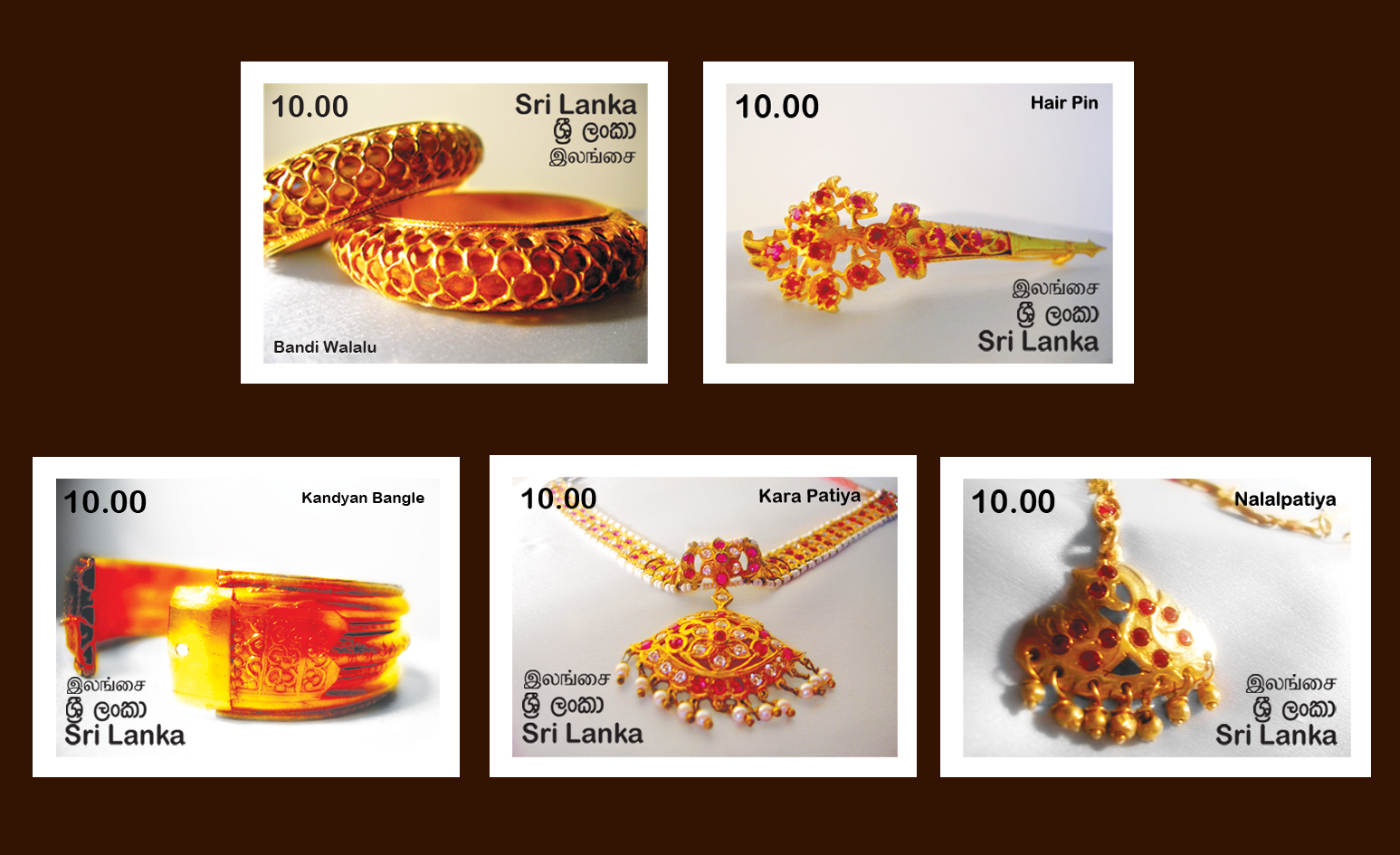
Jewellery from Sri Lankan/Kandyan Kingdom

== Kandyan culture today ==
Kandyans are people who come from the Kandyan hill capital and descendants of the Kandyan kingdom. Their customs and traditional habits are still preserved to a great extent with families giving parents and their elders an important role to play. In many ways their lives are unaffected by the rest of the world as they continue to follow Avurudu and prehera (king's parade) in August where you can see these jewellery items being displayed.

Kandy city stands apart from the rest of the country in many aspects. Even today the royal palace, now a Buddhist center, performs its rituals according to the royal decrees issued by the last king, Rajasinghe II of Kandy, and does not follow regulations issued by the state.

Due to its historical importance, Kandyan jewellery is highly priced and is at the heart of Ceylonese culture representing the glorious times of the Raja (Kings).

In 1815 when the British entered the citadel, Kandyan jewelry caught the attention of the British officials resulting in some of the sets being shipped off to the royal family in England as gifts, later becoming popular amongst women in high society in England.

Even today Kandyan jewellery sets are auctioned off at the best auction houses in the United Kingdom and Europe with a throatlet and necklaces being valued at £5000 to £8000 and the entire sets being sold for prices ranging from £50,000 to £200,000 depending on the design and antiquity of the sets. In Sri Lanka these sets are available on a seasonal basis for a dollar rate for outsiders.

Some of the old Kandyan families still living today include Angammana, Daulagala, Wattarantenne, Ellwela, Nugawela, Nugapitiya, Ratwatta, Halangoda, Weragama, Menikdiwela, Delpitiya, Palipane, Kobbekaduwe, Molamure, Muttettuwegama, Aluvihare, Hulangamuwa, Tenne, Galagoda, Lenawala, Mampitiya, Rambukwelle, Mediwake, Meegastenne, Amunugama, Mollagoda, Molligoda, Panebokke, Dunuwilla and Madugalle.

== Sources ==
There is much information about the Kandyan Kingdom and culture in the book Kandyan Kingdom, then and now by P. B. Alahakoon.
