= Foon Sham =

American sculptor

- Born: October 28, 1953 (age 72)
- Website: foonsham.com

Foon Sham is a Chinese-American sculptor specializing in wood. His geometric, precise, and rhythmic sculptures are part of collections in the United States and worldwide. Sham's work consists of both small-scale and large-scale structures that explore themes of sustainability, growth, and decay. In addition, Sham creates immersive and architectonic installations that have been displayed at the National Mall, universities, and public spaces. Sham is currently a full-time professor of fine art and sculpture at the University of Maryland, College Park.

== Early life ==
Foon Sham was born in Macao, China, and grew up in Hong Kong. At age ten, he was sent to study shading and perspective from a Chinese drawing master. Later, between the ages of twelve and sixteen, Sham studied painting under Chin Chung. His training consisted of copying many reproductions of landscapes and portraits, and he won art competitions at the ages of fifteen and sixteen. He later became a teaching assistant to Chung's younger students.

In 1975, Sham moved to the United States to pursue his art career and enroll in the California College of Arts and Crafts in Oakland as an international student. Sham originally studied textile design but eventually turned to sculpture. He earned his BFA in 1978 and his MFA in 1981 from Virginia Commonwealth University.

== Career and Artistic Practice ==
Sham initially favored wood because of its affordability. However, his preference for wood grew when he realized its versatility. Sham notes that "wood is very much like a person. Each piece has its own identity–color, grain structure, texture, and smell." He created his first large-scale interactive wood sculpture, Vase of Knowledge, in 1997. This was the first of his "vessels", or wooden sculptures made of small wooden blocks that nest into one another to give the illusion of a self-generated form. This was followed by 20-20-2, Joint in 1999.

Sham's public installations are site-specific. For example, Chapel Oak Vessel (2013) was a tribute to an oak tree that stood next to the Memorial Chapel of The University of Maryland in College Park for 75 years. The tree, also known as "Duke's Tree", was cut down in July 2012 because it was struck by lightning and was further damaged by fungi and insects. Resourcing the tree's wood, Sham created the orbital vessel, intending people to walk in and interact with the piece. According to Sham, the sculpture is a metaphor for transformation.

Later, his work progressed to social commentary. Escape (2017) was a commentary on the US-Mexico border designed specifically for the lights at the Katzen Arts Center at American University. The sculpture is a 62-foot-long wood tunnel with a ridgeline modeled off the US-Mexico border. Visitors were invited to walk through the tunnel and physically interact with the sculpture. Escape was inspired by Sham's experience as an immigrant to the United States.

In his work, Sham combines elements of Chinese culture and theory with ideas from Western discourses on nature. Art historian Aneta Georgievska-Shine argues that this sentiment is exemplified through his piece Sea of Hope (2003), which is a tribute to Sham's mother after her death from cancer in 2002. The piece features a wooden boat suspended above the ground, inspired by the Chinese spirit boats of the dead. Sham's sister contributed to the piece by sending a paper boat to add to the installation and invited other cancer survivors to do the same. In each installation of the piece, visitors added their own boats, culminating in more than 1,000 paper boats at the end of the exhibition.

== Recognition ==
Sham's work is part of the collections of United States Embassies worldwide, including the US Embassy in Norway, Bulgaria, and Suriname. His recent commissions include the Golden Triangle BID in Washington, DC, the Smithsonian Garden at the National Museum of American History, and the Schar Cancer Institute in Inova Virginia. Sham's sculpture, Ductile II, was featured in the 2023 Architectural Venice Biennale. In 2018, Sham received the Visionary Artist Award from the Smithsonian Institution and the Smithsonian Women's Committee. He has been teaching at the University of Maryland at College Park since 1988 and received the International Sculpture Center's Educator of the Year award in 2021.

Sham is represented by gallery Neptune & brown in Washington, DC.

== Selected public collections ==
- Kreeger Museum, Washington DC
- US Embassy in Suriname, Suriname
- Fundacao Rui Cunha Foundation, Macao
- Hong Kong Museum of Art, Hong Kong
- Art Omi International Arts Center, Ghent, New York
- Washington Metropolitan Area Transit Authority, Washington DC
- Strathmore Hall Arts Center, Bethesda, Maryland
