= Rainer Lagemann =

German metal sculptor and photographer (born 1959)

- Born: 14 September 1959 (age 66); Düsseldorf, Germany
- Education: Architecture
- Alma mater: FH Lippe University
- Known for: Metal sculptures and photography

Rainer Lagemann is a German metal sculptor and photographer. He is best known for his abstract steel sculptures of the human body.

== Early life ==
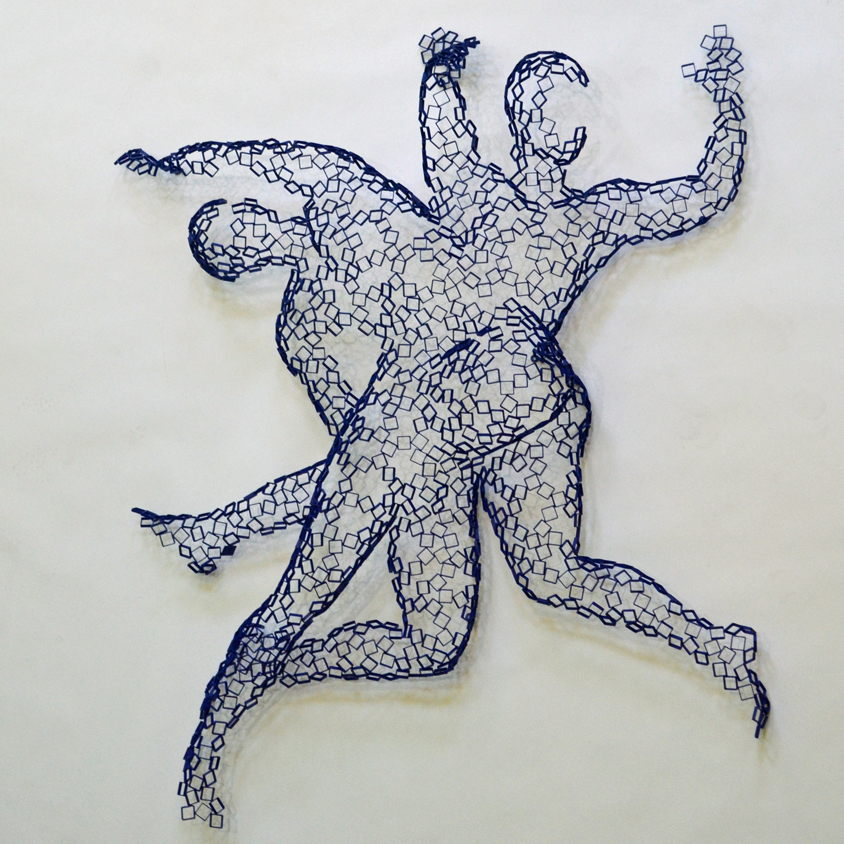
Dance – a statue by Rainer Lagemann

Lagemann was born in Düsseldorf, Germany on 14 September 1959. He attended the Albert Einstein Gymnasium for primary and secondary school, before taking an internship in a copper mine in Chile and then serving Germany with 18 months of civil service Zivildienst, delivering food to the elderly. He attended FH Lippe in Detmold, Germany in Interior-Architecture and Design between 1983 and 1987. After college he began a career in interior design. He moved to California in 1988, and eventually founded the interior design firm Bay Window Coverings in Berkeley, California. In 1992 he then founded The Magazine, which imported and retailed furniture from Europe to the Bay area.

== The Magazine ==
The Magazine was a furniture store chain in the Bay Area, with stores in Berkeley and San Francisco. Lagemann is the co-founder of The Magazine furniture chain in California and began his sculpture career in 2005. In 2001 he debuted the company website, and began selling the furniture online nationally, in addition to his brick-and-mortar stores. Within a few years, more than half of the company's business came in online. The company brought in about $2.3 million per year as of 2003. Lagemann sold his share in the business in 2007.

== Sculpture ==
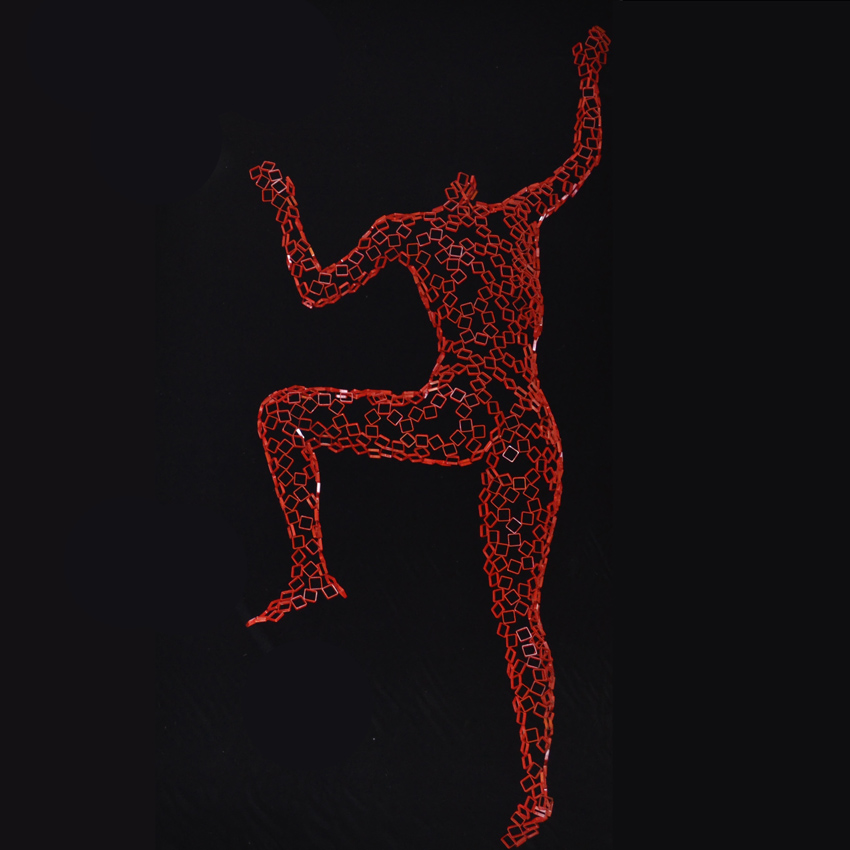
Near The Finish – a statue by Rainer Lagemann

Lagemann began his metal sculpting career when he learned to weld in 2005. In 2009 he moved from San Francisco to living in Miami. His work consists largely of life-sized sculptures of the human body while pursuing activities like swimming, yoga, climbing, or running. The sculptures are made of hollow metal squares, creating abstract figures.

The Huffington Post has stated of Lagemann that his sculptural work is descendant of Pablo Picasso, especially his creation of abstracted figurative sculptural work, writing further that, "He has an inventive and innovative iconic style, fashioned from hundreds of cut metal squares that he precisely welds together to form a whole."

He has created public art pieces including pieces proposed for the Miami Metrorail. Galleries that have exhibited his work include the Nikola Rukaj Gallery in Toronto, Ode to Art Gallery in Singapore and DTR Modern Galleries in Boston, New York, Washington DC and Palm Beach.

== Gallery ==
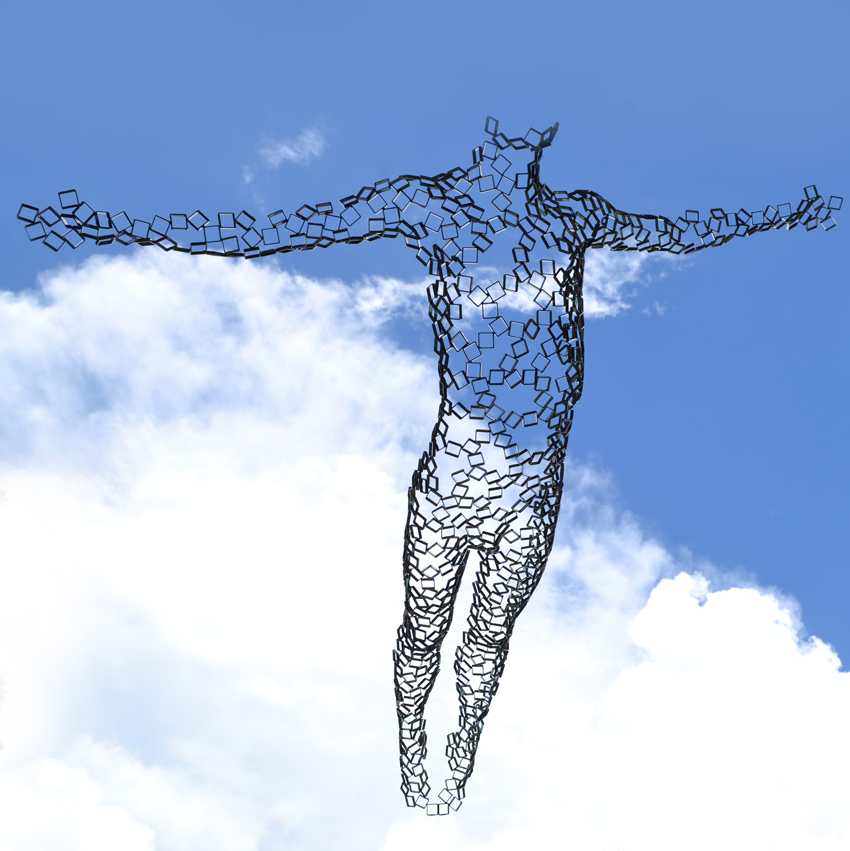
Pepa - a statue by Rainer Lagemann

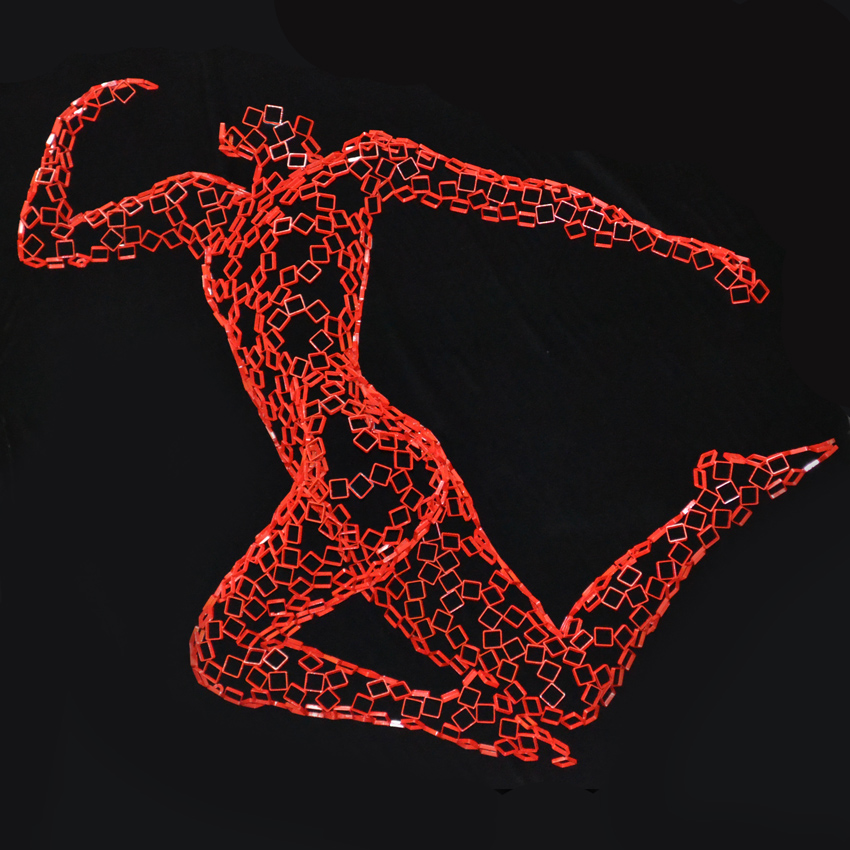
Red Swan - a statue by Rainer Lagemann

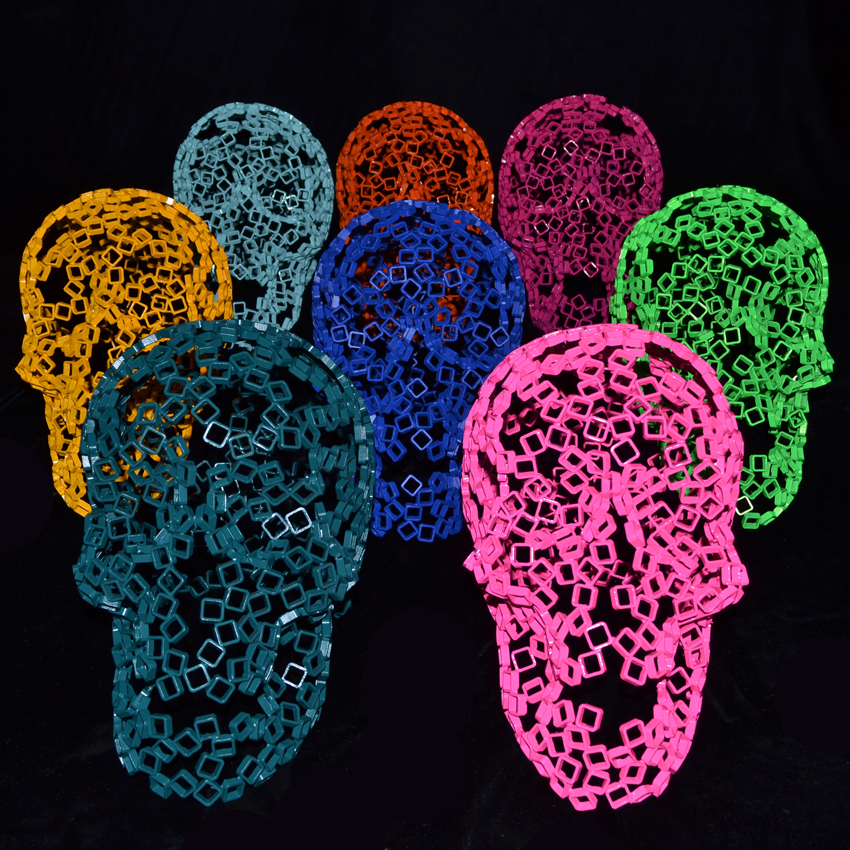
Skull statues by Rainer Lagemann
