= Old Post Office (Washington, D.C.) =

Hotel in Washington, DC

Waldorf Astoria Washington, D.C.

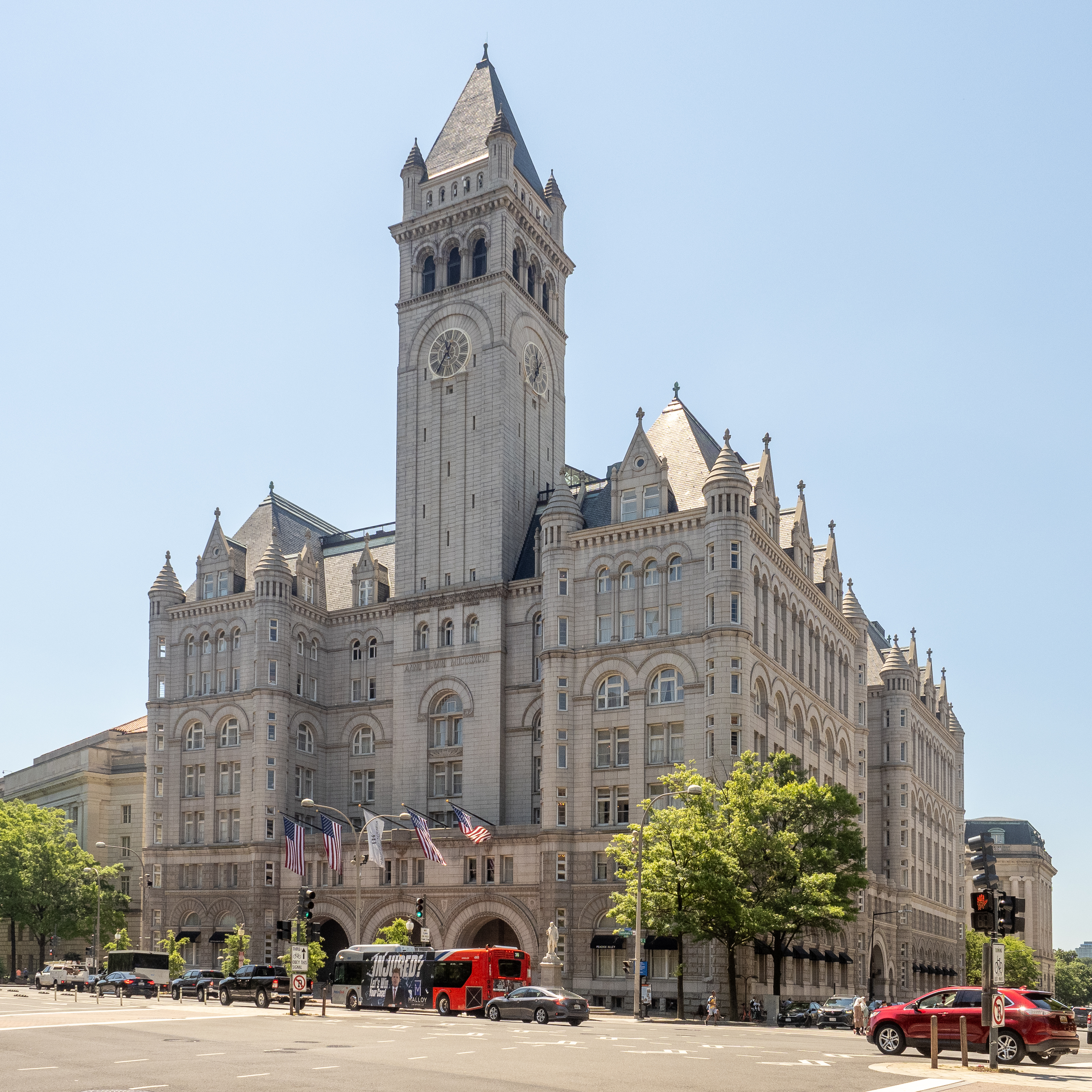
- The Old Post Office Building in 2024

- Location within Central Washington, D.C. Location within the District of Columbia Location within the United States

General information
- Architectural style: Romanesque Revival (original building); Modernist (East Atrium)
- Location: Washington, D.C., U.S.
- Coordinates: 38°53′39″N 77°1′39″W
- Completed: 1899; 127 years ago

Design and construction
- Architects: Willoughby J. Edbrooke (original building); Karn Charuhas Chapman & Twohey (East Atrium)

Website
- Official website
- Old Post Office
- U.S. National Register of Historic Places
- U.S. Historic district – Contributing property
- D.C. Inventory of Historic Sites
- Part of: Pennsylvania Avenue National Historic Site (ID66000865)
- NRHP reference No.: 73002105
- DCIHS No.: 450

Significant dates
- Added to NRHP: April 11, 1973
- Designated DCIHS: November 8, 1964

The Old Post Office, listed on the National Register of Historic Places as the Old Post Office and Clock Tower, is located at 1100 Pennsylvania Avenue, N.W. in Washington, D.C. It is a contributing property to the Pennsylvania Avenue National Historic Site. It is adjacent to the Federal Triangle station on the Washington Metro. The building's 315 feet (96 m) high clock tower houses the "Bells of Congress," and its observation level offers panoramic views of the city and its surroundings. The historic federal office building has been a hotel since 2016.

Construction began in 1892 and was completed in 1899. The building is an example of Richardsonian Romanesque architecture, popular in the late 19th-century United States. Its bell tower is the third tallest structure in Washington, D.C., excluding radio towers. It succeeded an earlier 1839 building, the General Post Office, which was built in Classical Revival style on F Street NW. It was used as the city's main General Post Office until 1914 at the beginning of World War I.

The Pennsylvania Avenue landmark functioned primarily as a federal office building. It was nearly torn down during the construction of the surrounding Federal Triangle complex in the 1920s and 1930s, and 1970s. Instead, major renovations to The Old Post Office Building were made in 1976 and 1983. The 1983 renovation added to the office structure, a food court, a retail space, and a roof skylight over the building's central atrium. It was upon this rehabilitation that the building acquired the name of the Old Post Office Pavilion. A glass-walled annex on a former adjacent parking lot was added to the structure in 1991.

In 2013, the U.S. General Services Administration (GSA) leased the property for 60 years to a consortium headed by "DJT Holdings LLC", a holding company that Donald Trump owns through a revocable trust. Trump developed the property into a luxury hotel, the Trump International Hotel Washington, D.C., which opened on September 12, 2016 and closed on May 11, 2022, after its sale to CGI Merchant Group. It reopened as the Waldorf Astoria Washington DC on June 1, 2022.

== History ==
=== Construction and opening ===
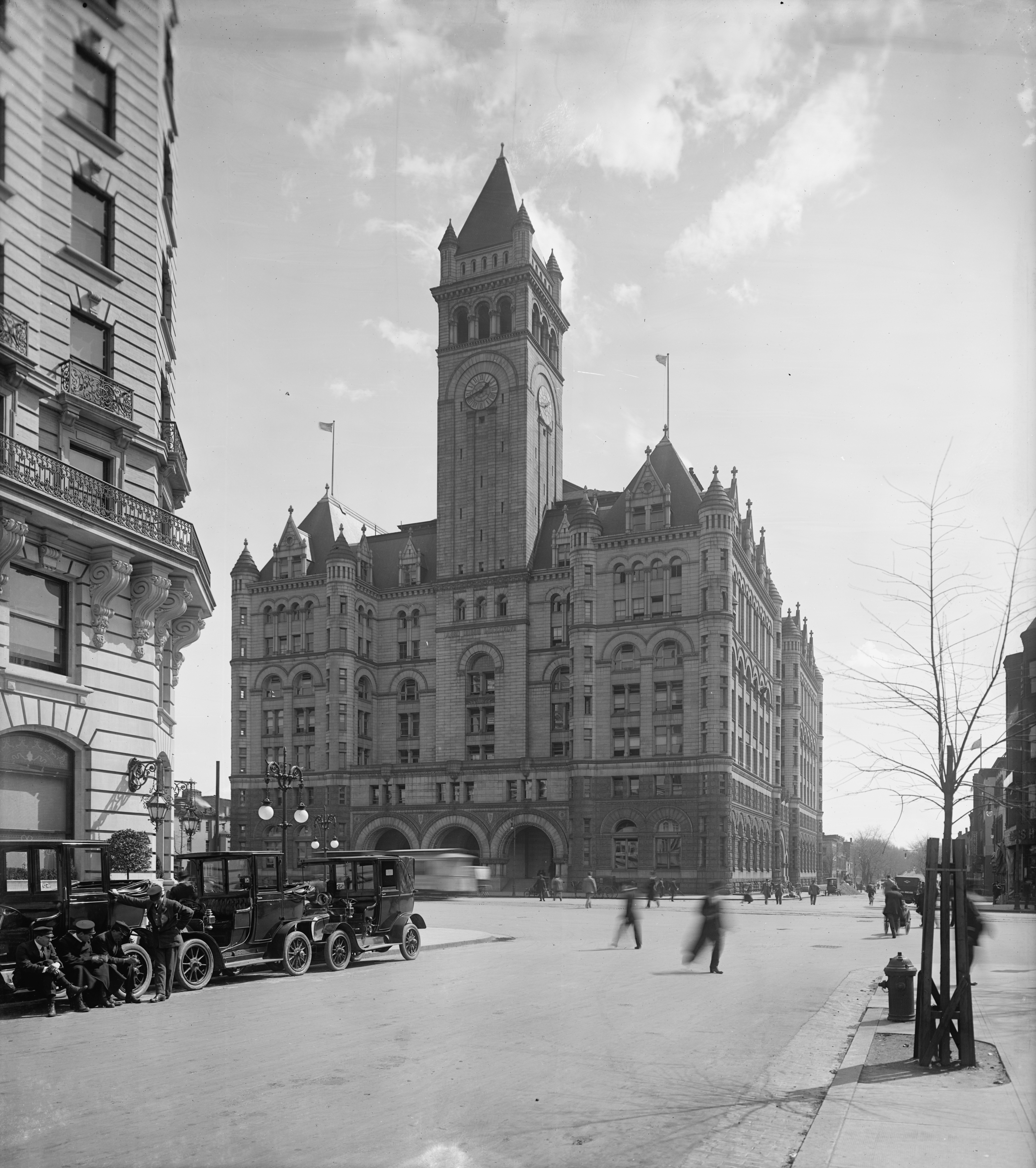
The Old Post Office Building in 1911

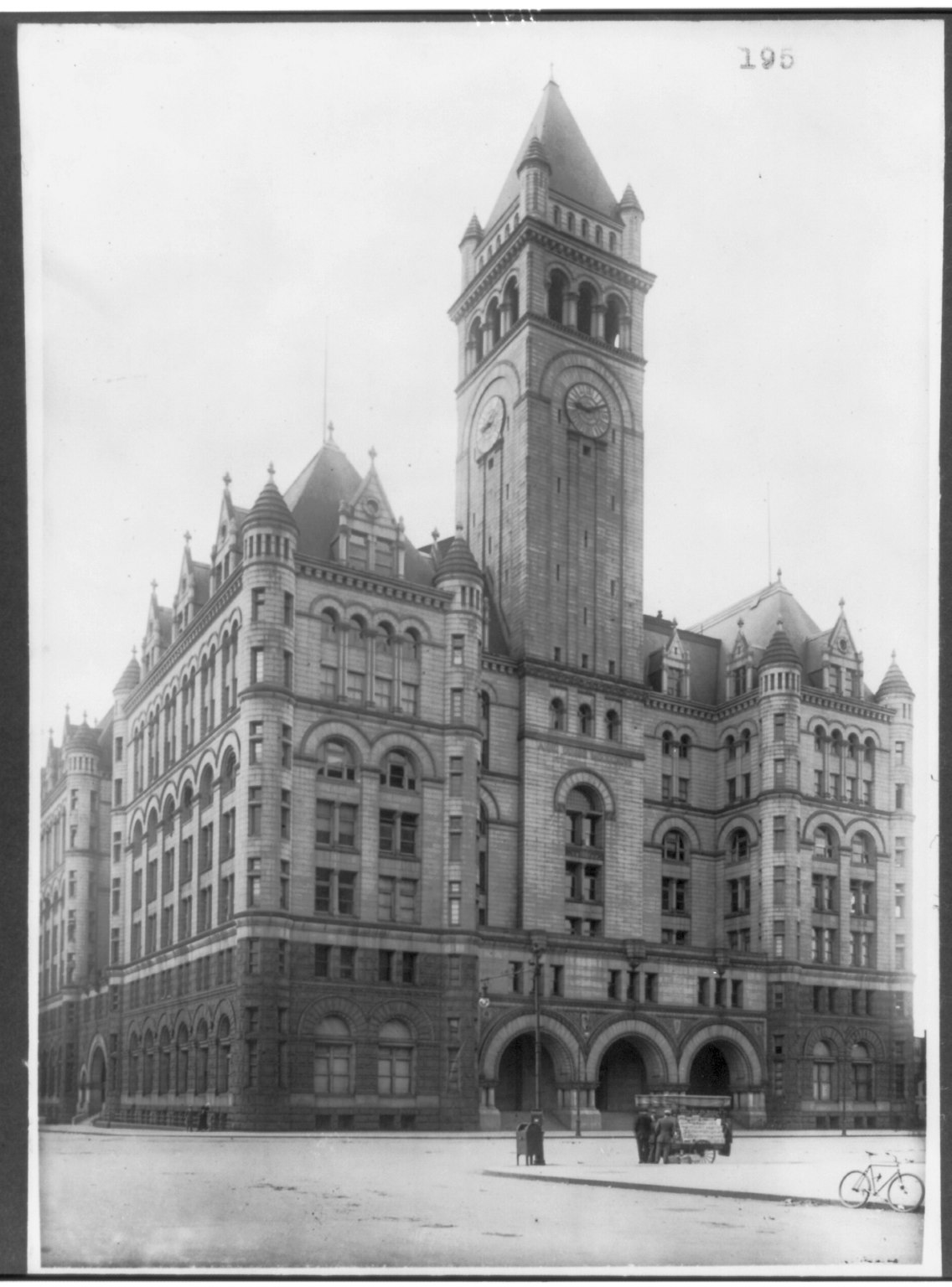
The Old Post Office, c. 1920

The United States Congress approved construction of a new post office for Washington, D.C., on June 25, 1890. The site, at the southeast corner of Pennsylvania Avenue and 12th Street, was chosen by Senator Leland Stanford in 1888 in the hope that the building would revitalize the Murder Bay neighborhood between the Capitol building and the White House. Willoughby J. Edbrooke, Supervising Architect of the Treasury Department, designed the structure in the tradition of the Romanesque Revival architecture of Henry Hobson Richardson. Construction began in 1892, and the building was complete in 1899. The total cost of construction was $3 million.

At the time of its completion, the Post Office Building contained the largest uninterrupted enclosed space in the city. Its clock tower reached 315 feet (96 m) into the air. It was also the city's first building to have a steel frame structure, and the first to be built with electrical wiring incorporated into its design. The structure featured elevators with cages of highly intricate wrought iron, a glass covered atrium and mezzanine level, and floors, moldings, railings, and wainscoting made of marble. The atrium was 196 feet (60 m) high, and 10 floors of balconies looked out onto the space (which provided interior light in an era when indoor lighting was not common). It boasted more than 39,000 interior electric lights, and its own electrical generator. Girders and catwalks spanned the atrium at the third floor level to allow post office supervisors to look down on the workers. The fifth floor housed executive offices in the corners. Each office had a turret, ornately carved wooden moldings, and red oak paneling. But there were problems with the structure. The Washington Star reported that the skylights and windows leaked air and water, the marble floors were poorly laid, and much of the construction was shoddy. The ninth floor was to have served as a file room, but a post-construction inspection showed it could not accommodate the weight. Technological advances in electricity and electrical wiring, mechanical engineering, heating, and movement of air made the building out of date as soon as it opened. The anticipated economic development, however, never occurred.

=== 19th century ===
At the 1898 meeting of the American Institute of Architects, the structure was criticized as supremely ugly during a plenary address by New York City architect George B. Post. That same year, Senator Joseph Roswell Hawley called it "a cross between a cathedral and a cotton mill". By the time it opened, the building was also too small to accommodate the government agencies which occupied it. The city postmaster had advocated a building with a 50,000-square-foot (4,600 m^{2}) footprint, but only 10,000 square feet (930 m^{2}) were purchased. The post office used the main floor and mezzanine, but these were already too crowded by January 1900. Treasury Department offices were to have taken over the eighth floor, but the structure was so overcrowded that this move was suspended.

A year after the building opened, an accident there took the life of Washington, D.C. Postmaster James P. Willett. On September 30, 1899, Willett fell 90 feet (27 m) down an open elevator shaft. Nothing more than a flimsy wooden barrier prevented access to the shaft. Willett died a day later.

In the early 1880s, Senator Justin Smith Morrill and Senator John James Ingalls proposed razing all the structures between Pennsylvania Avenue and B Street (now Constitution Avenue) to the south to create a park. The influential McMillan Plan of 1902, however, proposed retaining the structure. (It could hardly have done otherwise, with the building only just having been completed.) Nonetheless, the same year the Washington Post editorialized in favor of its demolition. In 1906, discussing plans to beautify Washington, essayist Sammuel E. Moffett disparagingly called the building a "Kansas City emporium so utterly out of keeping with the general atmosphere of official Washington that it sets the teeth of architects on edge". Later that year, Senator Weldon B. Heyburn introduced legislation to authorize the federal government to purchase all the land between Pennsylvania Avenue (northeast side), the National Mall (south side), 15th Street N.W. (west side), and the Capitol grounds (to the east) for the construction of an architecturally "harmonious" set of massive office buildings. Heyburn's plan retained the architecturally dominating Post Office Building of 1899 with its commanding tower, but adjusted its Pennsylvania Avenue side to be parallel with the street.

The clock in the building tower was originally mechanical in nature, and kept accurate time via gravity. A cable was wrapped around a drum, and a large weight attached to the end of the cable. As the cable unwound due to the force of gravity, the clock hands turned. The cable was rewound once or twice a day.

=== 20th century ===
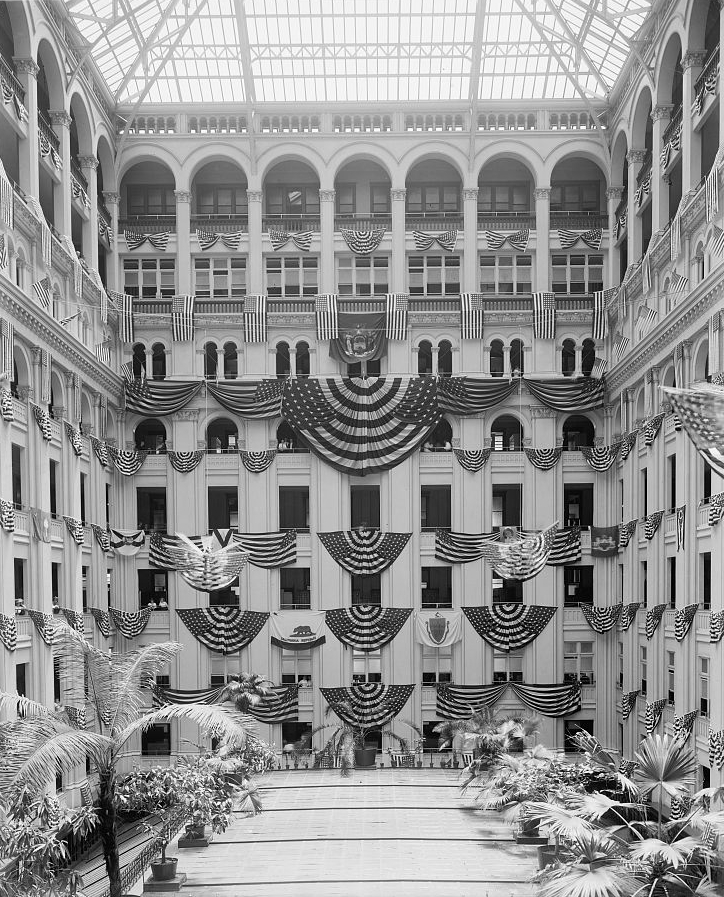
Atrium of the old 1899 General Post Office Building in June 1914

In 1914, the District of Columbia's General Post Office moved to a larger Beaux Arts/Classical Revival building constructed next to recently completed Union Station of similar impressive style, taking advantage of heavy use of the national railroad system for speedier mail delivery. Although only 15 years old, the building at 12th Street and Pennsylvania Avenue was now commonly called the "old" post office. For the next forty years, the building served as office space for several government agencies.

The Old Post Office Building was slated for demolition during construction of the Federal Triangle. In 1926, the United States Congress enacted the Public Buildings Act, which authorized the construction not only of the Federal Triangle complex of buildings but also a new U.S. Supreme Court building opposite the east front of the United States Capitol on the site of the Civil War-era Old Capitol Prison, and north of the Library of Congress's Thomas Jefferson Building, completed in 1897. Government officials, other experts, and the press believed that the demolition of the 1898 District Building ("city hall" for the District of Columbia) and the Old Post Office Building, and the closure of many streets in the area, would follow. A Board of Architectural Consultants was created on May 19, 1927, to advise the federal agencies developing the Federal Triangle on how to proceed.

By July 1927, the board had fashioned a general plan for the area, but did not address whether the Old Post Office Building, the District Building, or the Southern Railway Building should be torn down. Planning for the complex was deeply influenced by the City Beautiful movement and the idea of creating a civic center to achieve efficiency in administration as well as reinforce the public's perception of government as authoritative and permanent. For the architectural style of the buildings, the board adopted the McMillan Plan's recommendation of the Neoclassical style. Rather than a mass of tall, imposing buildings, two unifying open spaces (intended for ceremonial use, and under discussion by the Board at least by March 1928) would be utilized. The first would be a Circular Plaza (inspired by the Place Vendôme) bisected by 12th Street NW, and which would require the demolition of the Old Post Office Building.

By 1934, however, although the government had cleared land around the Old Post Office Building, Congress was increasingly opposed to demolishing the structure. Tearing down a structurally sound 35-year-old building during the Great Depression seemed foolish. But the executive branch agencies overseeing the Federal Triangle's construction still wanted it gone. Yet, it was not demolished. Four years passed. Although a push was made in 1938 to remove the Old Post Office Building, Senator Elmer Thomas defended it and attacked the erection of a Neoclassical office building in its place as financially unacceptable.

The effort to remove the building in 1938 was the last one for 30 years. Various reasons have been suggested for why the Old Post Office Building survived. A common claim is that the federal government, fighting the Great Depression, simply did not have the money. Press reports at the time, however, noted that voters would have punished congressmen who tore down a perfectly good building. Architectural historians have also argued that President Franklin D. Roosevelt (who took office in March 1933, five years into the Federal Triangle's construction) was not interested in completing the expensive complex of white marble office buildings or making the Federal Triangle architecturally harmonious.

The Old Post Office Building's tower slowly became an iconic one in the city. The United States Information Agency often used it as a backdrop for propaganda films to be shown in foreign countries. In one instance, a portion of a film about Soviet dissident Alexander Solzhenitsyn was filmed in the tower.

By the 1950s, and Eisenhower era, the neighborhood around the Old Post Office Building had also declined. Pennsylvania Avenue N.W. was marked by deteriorating homes, shops, and office buildings on the north side and monumental Neoclassical federal office buildings of the 1920s-30s era Federal Triangle on the south.

On October 10, 1956, the weight of the clock came loose from the cable and plunged through two floors, narrowly avoiding killing a man, who had just gotten up from his desk. The mechanical clock was later replaced with an electric one.

After observing the poor state of the Avenue during his inaugural parade from the United States Capitol to the White House, 35th President John F. Kennedy appointed a President's Council on Pennsylvania Avenue to study ways to improve the area. The council's draft plan was ready for Kennedy's approval almost two and a half years later when he was assassinated in Dallas Texas on November 22, 1963. The draft plan retained the Old Post Office Building.

Kennedy's successor, 36th President Lyndon B. Johnson, agreed to move forward with the plan and appointed a Temporary President's Commission on Pennsylvania Avenue, although it did not hold its first meeting until May 21, 1965. The new commission recommended that the Old Post Office be torn down in favor of completing the plan for the Federal Triangle. The temporary commission managed to prevent development of the avenue which was contrary to the draft plan, but it never was able to win congressional approval for its plan. It ceased to function on November 15, 1969, due to lack of funds. A permanent Pennsylvania Avenue Development Corporation (PADC) was finally created by Congress on October 30, 1972.

An attempt to demolish the Old Post Office Building began in February 1970. The National Capital Planning Commission, a federal agency with legal jurisdiction over major building projects in the Washington metropolitan area, agreed (although it said the tower might be preserved). Within days, Wolf Von Eckardt, the influential architectural critic of The Washington Post, began campaigning for the structure's preservation. No action was taken on the demolition project in 1970, and Von Eckardt continued to press for the building's preservation in 1971. By early 1971, a group of local citizens and architects formed a group known as "Don't Tear It Down" (predecessor to the D.C. Preservation League). The group's members included Nancy Hanks, the politically influential chairwoman of the National Endowment for the Arts. Don't Tear It Down began heavily lobbying the PADC, the GSA (which owned the building for the federal government), White House, Congress, and D.C. city government to stop the demolition. Opposition to the demolition began to grow in the U.S. Senate, which held hearings on the buildings in April 1971. Preservation forces received a major boost in May 1971 when the federal Advisory Council on Historic Preservation recommended retaining it.

The Nixon administration, however, continued to seek its demolition so that Federal Triangle could be completed in time for the United States Bicentennial in 1976. But by this time, Senator Mike Gravel, chair of the Subcommittee on Public Buildings and Grounds of the Committee on Public Works was strongly opposed to the effort. Gravel sought allies in the United States House of Representatives, and in June 1972, the House Committee on Appropriations voted down Nixon's request for money to demolish the Old Post Office.

==== Preservation and renovation ====
The Old Post Office was added to the National Register of Historic Places in 1973. That same year, the GSA formally dropped its intention to demolish the building and instead developed a plan to preserve it. The National Capital Planning Commission agreed to the project.

Major renovation of the structure was made possible in 1976 by enactment of the Public Buildings Cooperative Use Act. The law gave GSA the legal authority to lease federal buildings and use the money received for renovations and upgrades. It also legalized the use of a portion of federal office buildings for commercial retail and restaurant use. The Old Post Office was the first major project begun under the law.

An $18 million renovation began in 1977. The building badly needed it: The atrium roof had been covered over, making the interior dark; the building leaked and had suffered extensive water damage; there was mold throughout the building; the tower was filled with five to six meters of pigeon droppings, and the heating system often broke down.

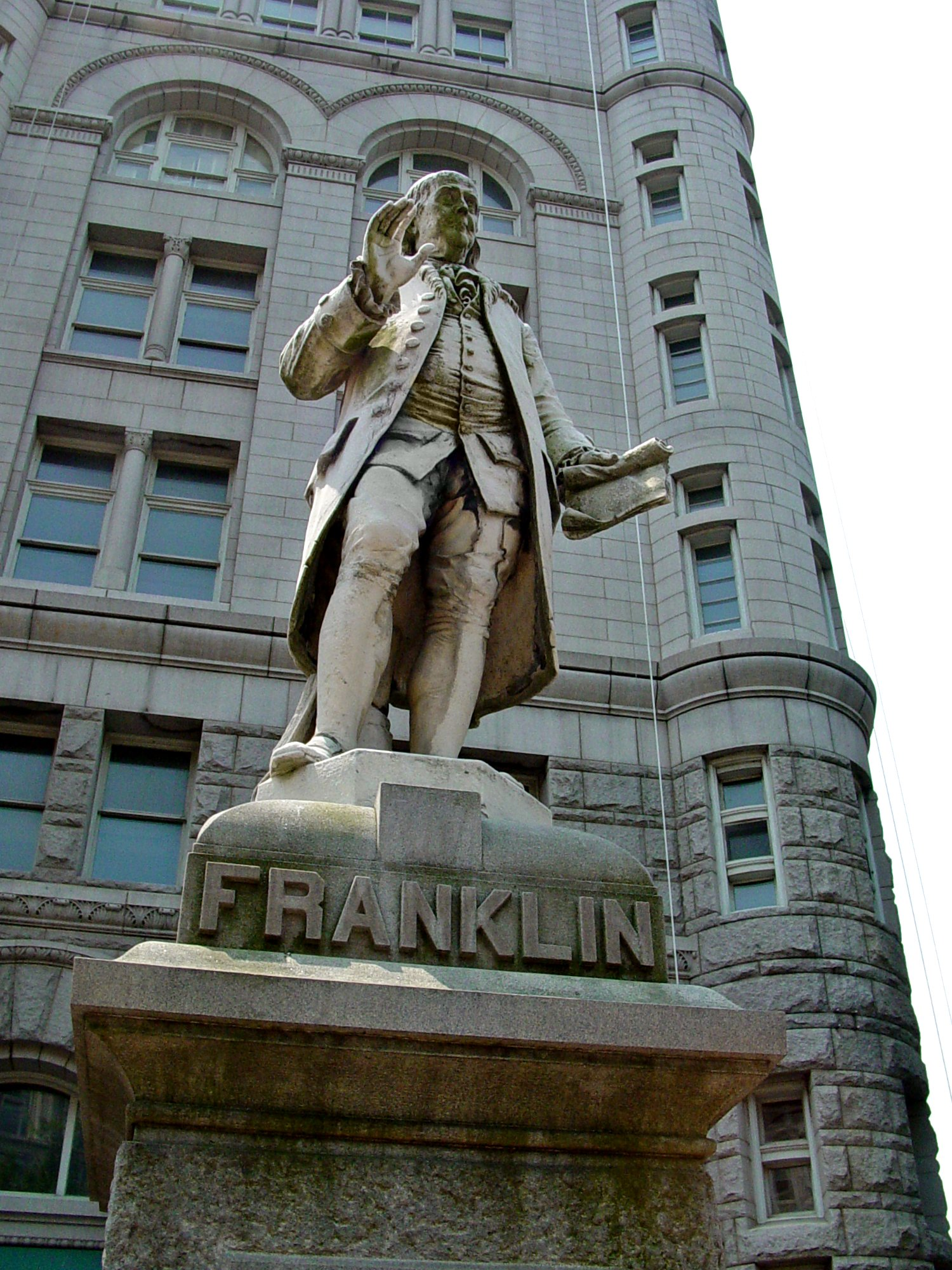
The statue of Benjamin Franklin in front of the building

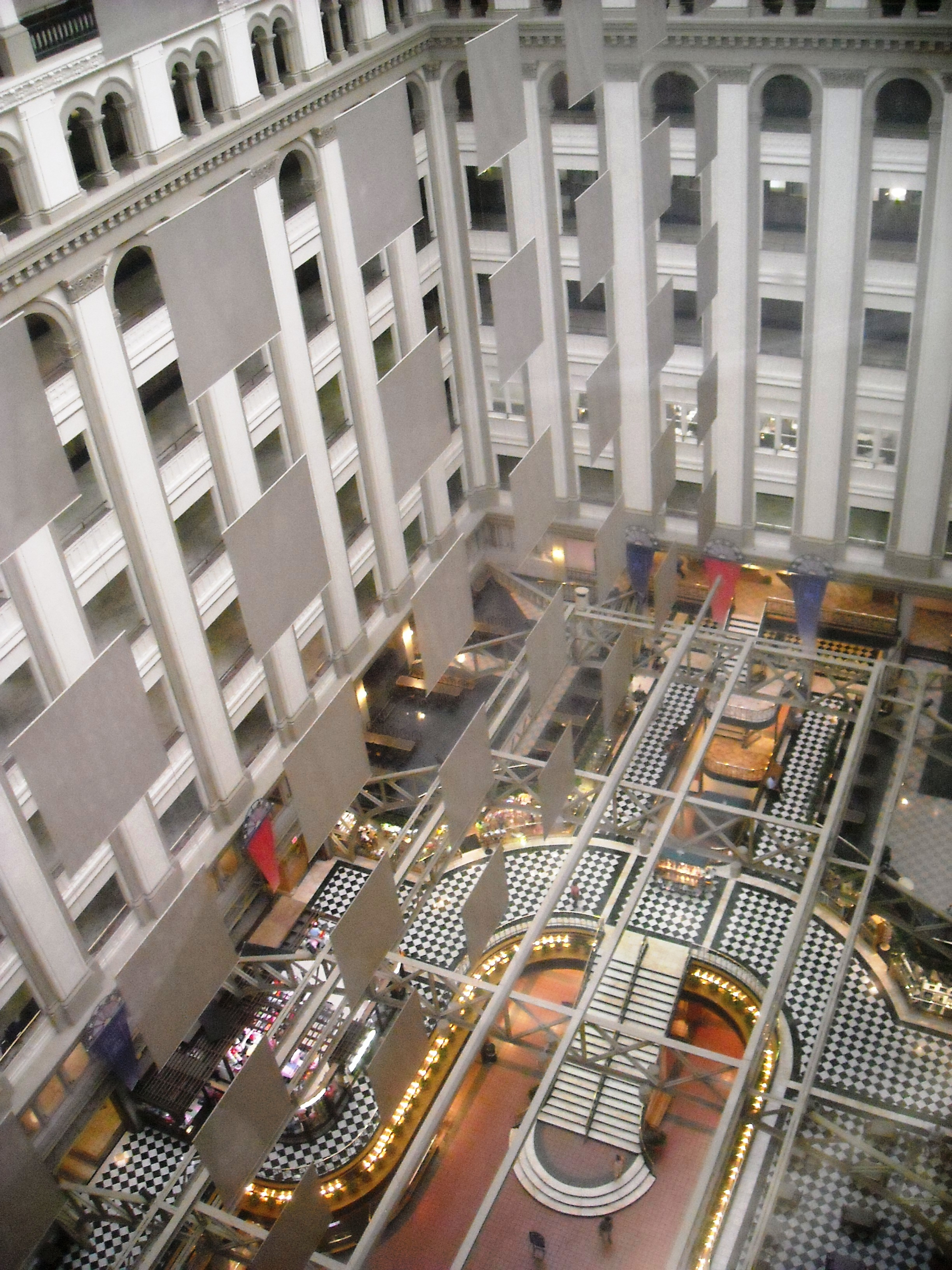
The 1983 renovation added the grand staircase, seen from above in 2009

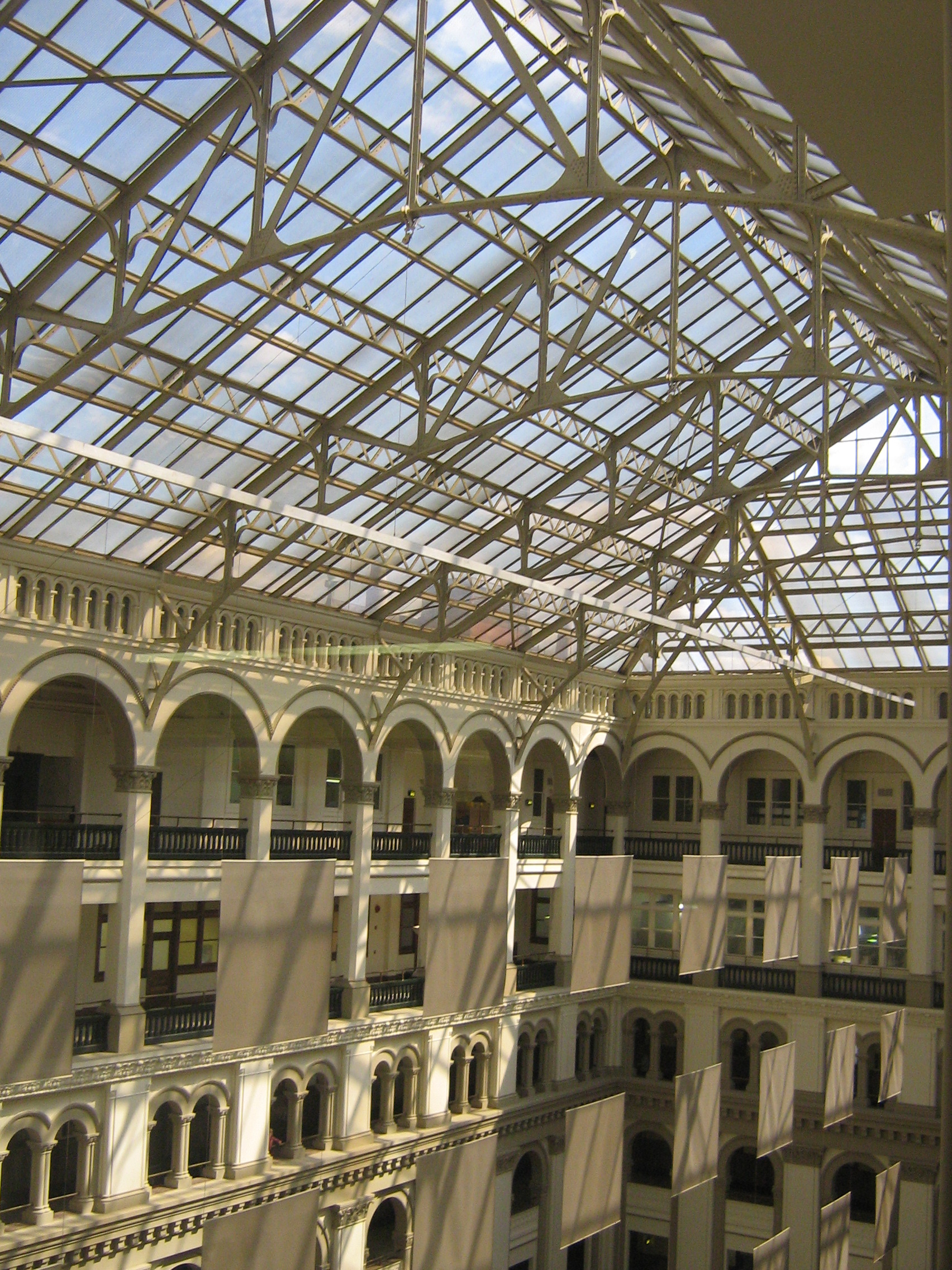
Skylight above the grand staircase in 2009

The GSA held a competition in 1978 to find a partner willing to redevelop the Old Post Office Building. The agency believed that the configuration of the interior space and downtown real estate market would support only a hotel. But the winning bid did not propose a hotel. A joint venture by four firms—McGaughy, Marshall & McMillan; Arthur Cotton Moore Associates; Associated Space Design, Inc.; and Stewart Daniel Hoban & Associates—won the competition. GSA and the bidding team reached an agreement for a 55-year lease. GSA collected $166,000 a year in rent, which increased just 5 percent during the life of the lease. GSA also received a percentage of all profits from the enterprise.

The $29 million renovation was completed in 1983. Much of the building was gutted to utilize the interior space more efficiently, but some "preservation zones" were established to retain the interior's historic character. Much of the old marble was replaced with new, pink marble, and the interior repainted in shades of cream, gray, green, and ivory pastels. A glass-enclosed elevator to the observation deck was also added, as well as a new grand staircase to the second floor and two 6,000-square-foot (560 m^{2}) restaurants. Artwork added included Robert Irwin installation 48 Shadow Planes. The renovated building was officially dedicated on April 19, 1983. Vice President George H. W. Bush presided over the event. The re-opening was celebrated with peals from the Bells of Congress from the clock tower. Federal tenants included the Institute for Museum Services, National Endowment for the Arts, the National Endowment for the Humanities, and the President's Committee on the Arts and Humanities. (Modular office furniture was used to allow more people to work in the offices, which proved controversial among federal employees used to traditional desks and chairs.) The retail levels, which occupied the first three floors of the building, opened on September 13, 1983. The retail section included a performance space known as the Nancy Hanks Center.

Hanks died on January 7, 1983, just weeks before the building's re-opening. The clock tower and observation deck reopened to the public on May 1, 1984. The 1983 renovation won strong praise from architectural critic Benjamin Forgey.

The commercial space was designed by the Boston firm of Benjamin Thompson & Associates, and it was leased by Evans Development Co. of Baltimore. More than 50 restaurants and boutique retail stores were anticipated to sublet portions of the three-story retail section, and it was 98% leased at its opening. The building's atrium and retail spaces thereupon acquired the name of "Old Post Office Pavilion". During the mid-1980s, Hillman Properties bought out its partner, Evans Development, and took control of the Old Post Office Pavilion.

In 1980, a statue of Benjamin Franklin, originally created in 1889, was placed outside the building near the front entrance, where it currently stands.

In 1983, Congress enacted legislation formally renaming the Old Post Office the Nancy Hanks Center.

During 1983, the District of Columbia government and the United States Postal Service created a 14-foot (4 m) by 21-foot (6 m) wooden replica of the Postal Service's new 1984 twenty-cent "Love" stamp (see Post-World War II United States postage stamps and postal history).

Starting in 1984, replicas of the latest versions of the "Love" stamp were lowered from the spire of the Old Post Office Building's Clock Tower around midnight during each New Year's Eve.

Musicians entertained ballroom dancers within the building while fireworks and searchlight beams illuminated the night-time sky and celebrities performed on outdoor stages. At midnight, bells pealed from the tower and neon signs flashed "Happy New Year" amid laser light shows. As 1985 waned, D.C. Mayor Marion Barry predicted: "We're going to outdo New York. We think we might just take over and become the best single event."

The stamp became larger over the years. The celebration that marked the beginning of 1986 featured a 900 lb (408 kg) illuminated replica of that year's twenty-two cent puppy "Love" stamp. By the beginning of 1990, the neon-lighted stamp had reached a size of 20 feet (6 m) by 30 feet (9 m) and a weight of two tons (1814 kg).

Up to 100,000 people celebrated at the event during each of its early years. However, after the celebration marking the beginning of 1986 had ended, clean-up crews found a strangled and raped 18-year-old woman dead in a stairwell 100 yards away from an indoor stage at which Cab Calloway had earlier performed. Although the event that marked the beginning of 1988 was orderly and well-attended, the D.C. government withdrew its funding later that year because the event's costs had become prohibitive.

Attendance at the event then fell precipitously. As a result, the Postal Service decided in 1990 to stop dropping the stamp. Although the Pavilion hosted a party for 2,500 during which a smaller version of a "Love" stamp descended within the building's atrium to mark the beginning of 1991, the outdoor events disappeared.

Despite the positive news about the Old Post Office Pavilion, it was not doing well. GSA imposed conditions on the 1983 renovation that left the retail pavilion looking like an office building rather than a shopping mall. There was also too little retail space, the retail space was poorly configured due to the architectural design of the building, and GSA refused to allow any storefronts on the exterior that would signal that there was retail or restaurants inside. The pavilion's revenues were generated in about equal parts from tourists, local office workers, and local residents. Although most retailers were making money, revenues fluctuated wildly on a seasonal basis. Restaurants had a difficult time earning money, and turnover among them was high.

Old Post Office Joint Venture, a group led by Hillman Properties, the developer of the pavilion, was also losing money. Old Post Office Joint Venture (OPOJV) received $166,000 a year in rent from GSA, but its agreement with the federal government called for doubling the size of the retail space to 100,000 square feet (9,300 m^{2}). Approval for that expansion had never been given. OPOJV originally proposed expansion of the retail space into the Internal Revenue Service Building, but this was rejected for security reasons. It then proposed an underground parking lot and pavilion expansion in the area occupied by the IRS building's parking lot, but this, too, was not approved.

==== East Atrium annex ====
With the financial situation at the Old Post Office Pavilion worsening, OPOJV proposed building a glass-enclosed annex on the IRS building's parking lot. The proposal was strongly opposed by the D.C. Historic Preservation Review Board. Nonetheless, Congress appropriated $1.7 million for the project and OPOJV agreed to contribute another $15 million. The National Capital Planning Commission also gave its approval to the project.

The new East Atrium opened on March 6, 1992. The three-level structure had 100,000 square feet (9,300 m^{2}) of interior space and a glass roof. Under the terms of the development agreement, the federal government owned the land beneath the structure, but the building was owned by Hillman Properties. As construction occurred, the Old Post Office Pavilion lost many of its high-end retailers and replaced them with low-end shops selling mugs, souvenirs, T-shirts, and other items aimed at tourists. The East Atrium, however, included larger and more upscale retailers. The addition also featured a 5,000-square-foot (460 m^{2}) miniature golf course and bar. The East Atrium was managed by General Growth Properties, which said about 78 percent of the space was leased. The East Atrium was not well received, critically. Architecture critic Benjamin Forgey acknowledged that the building achieved its goals; incorporated many modern architectural design features (such as glass curtain walls, setbacks, and good connections to sidewalks and pedestrian areas); and it added a piece of the 1982 master plan for Federal Triangle. But Forgey called the design by the local architectural firm of Karn Charuhas Chapman & Twohey awkward, with "clunky" proportions and over-heavy elements. The interior, however, won praise for its lightness.

A small fire broke out on the west side of the Old Post Office Building between the ninth floor ceiling and the roof on August 26, 1992. Workers repairing the roof accidentally caused the blaze, which began at 3:45 pm and was extinguished 45 minutes later. Although small, the fire snarled downtown traffic during the evening rush hour.

By October 1993, despite more than 3 million visitors a year, OPOJV was behind on its rent to GSA and in default on its mortgage to Collin Equities (a subsidiary of Wells Fargo). Real estate experts blamed the cost of heating and cooling the vast atrium, heavy tenant turnover, and the lack of a theater for a space below the East Atrium. Although the D.C. Convention and Visitors Association said the Old Post Office was the eighth most-visited attraction in the District of Columbia, retail experts believed it had never made money, and the East Atrium did not bring in enough rent to support the Old Post Office Pavilion.

Collin Equities/Wells Fargo foreclosed on OPOJV in October 1993. The bank hired Hill Partners, a real estate management firm from Charlotte, North Carolina, to revitalize the retail aspects of the development. Hill Partners said that improving access to and shoppers' awareness of the retail area, it could double the number of visitors to the Old Post Office to more than 7 million. Hill Partners began reevaluating its tenant mix with a view to adding retailers which D.C. residents needed. It also revealed that the East Atrium was a money-loser, never filling more than half its space. Whether the East Atrium would remain open was not clear. The company agreed, however, to keep the Pavilion area a "festival marketplace" (one which offers a combination of entertainment, food, and retail shops).

In March 1995, the Cineplex Odeon Corporation said it would open a seven-screen movie theater in East Atrium (which now had no tenants). But the company pulled out in May 1996, saying it could not reach a lease agreement with Hill Partners.

Hill Partners had a difficult time finding any new tenants for the East Atrium and for the Pavilion. Virgin Group said in June 1996 it might build a Virgin Megastore, 8-to-12 screen Virgin Cinema, and possible a rock music-themed restaurant at the Old Post Office. But the company wanted the main building for its retail outlets, not the East Atrium. But nothing came of these discussions.

In 1997, a hotel development firm, Denhill D.C. LLC, approached GSA and offered to take over Collins Equities/Wells Fargo lease. The company said it would spend more than $100 million to turn the office space on the upper floors into hotel rooms and open the Pennsylvania Avenue walls to create more access and street-front retail space. In return, the company asked the GSA to extend the 55-year lease to 65 years, and give it the option of adding three more decade-long lease extension options. According to Denhill D.C. officials, the negotiations were so far advanced that they had a management company ready to operate the hotel and retail tenants ready to take space. GSA said it then ended the negotiations over legal concerns that it was about to enter into a long-term lease without advertising it to other bidders.

=== 21st century ===
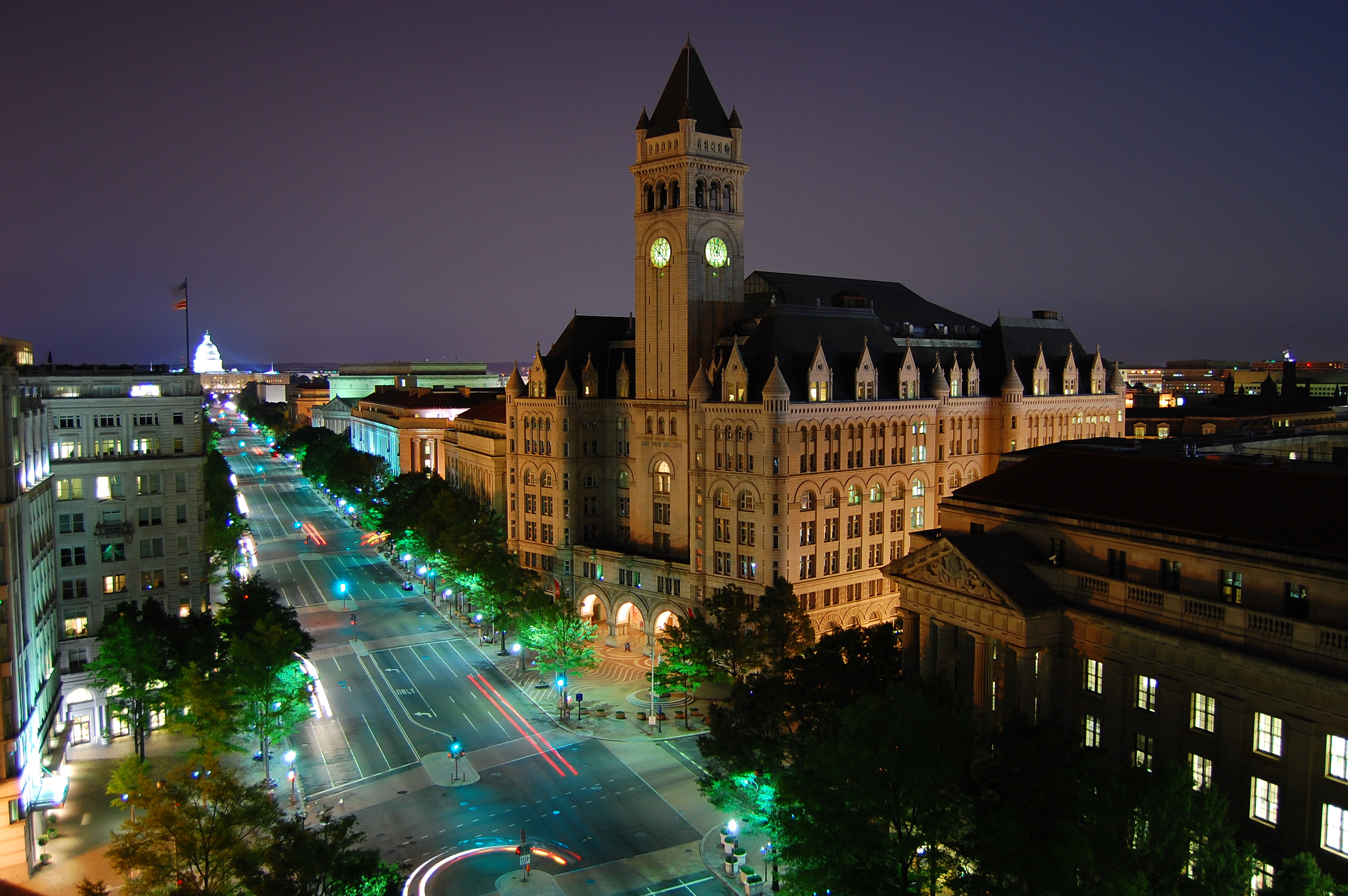
Looking southeast down Pennsylvania Avenue toward the Old Post Office Building and Tower on the south side and United States Capitol in the distance in 2007

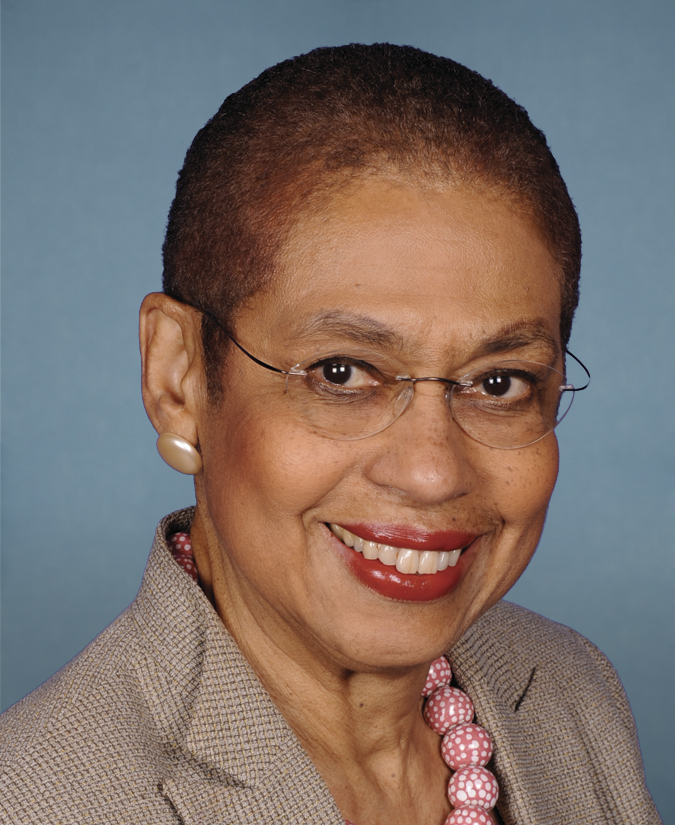
Eleanor Holmes Norton, a Washington, D.C. delegate, who won passage of federal legislation in 2008 requiring the GSA to redevelop the Old Post Office Building.

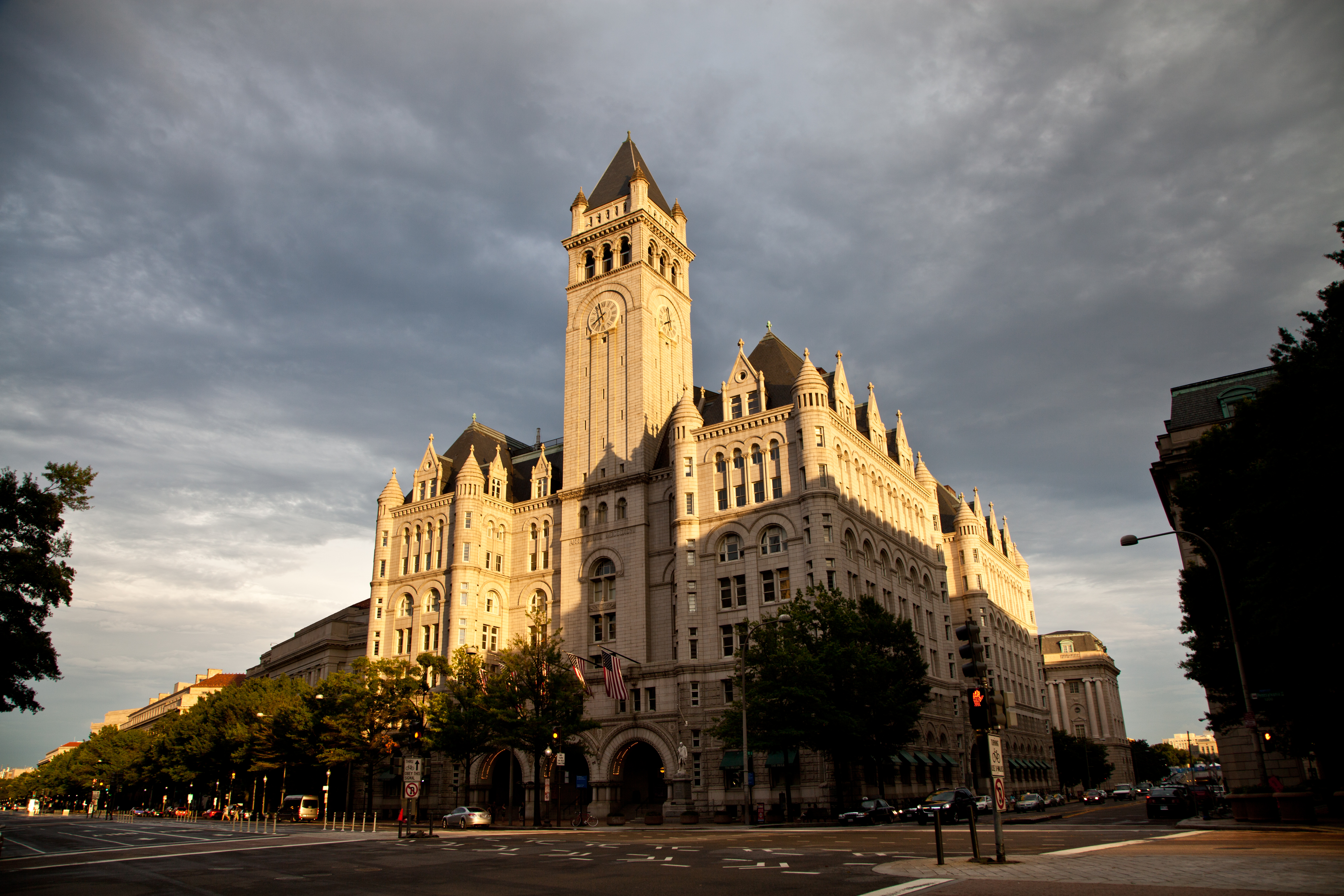
Evening view of the Old Post Office and Clock Tower in July 2012

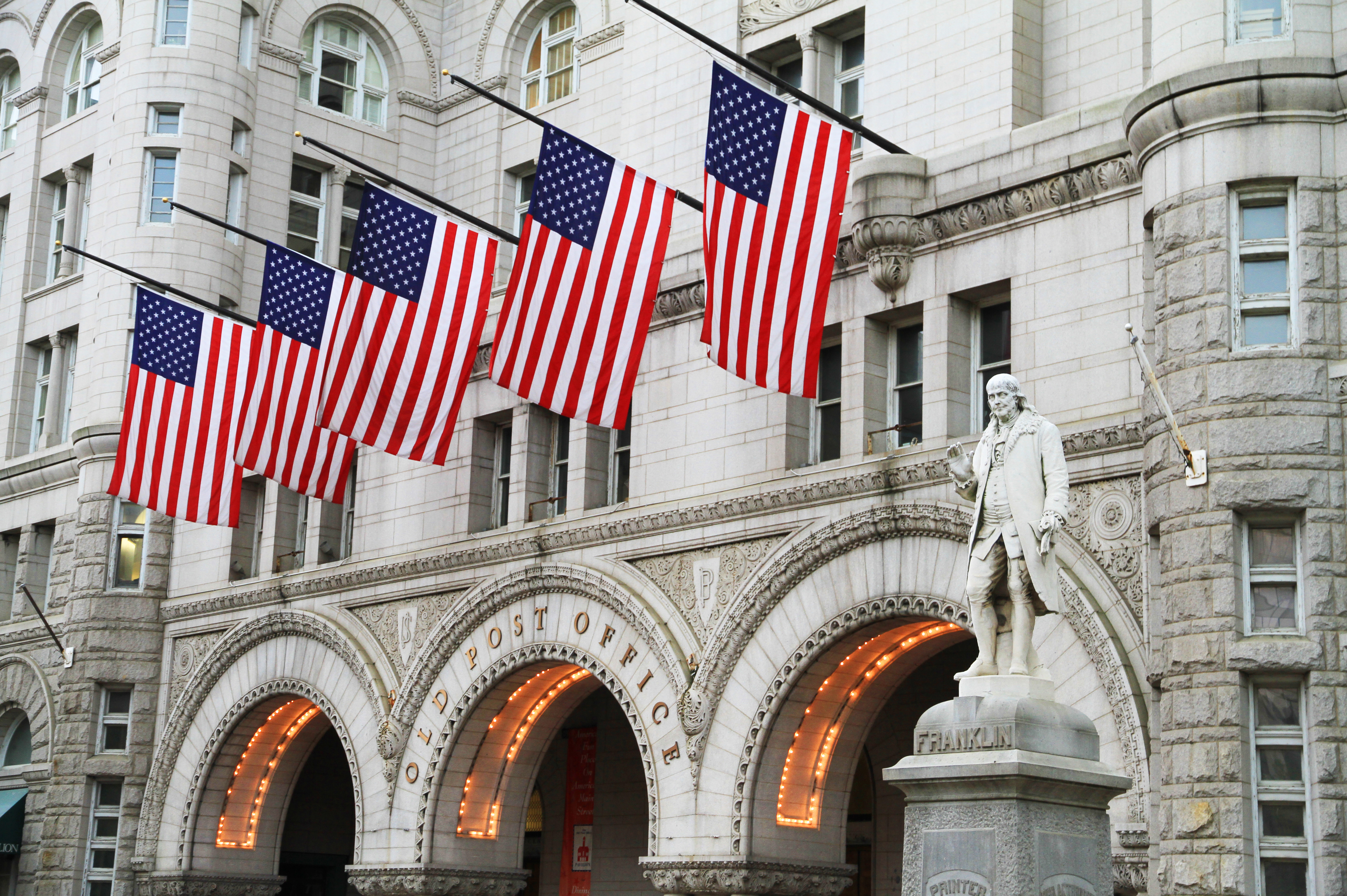
Entrance to Old Post Office Pavilion before 2014 redevelopment in 2013

By August 2000, business conditions at the Old Post Office had sunk even lower. Operations there had never turned a profit in 17 years, the vacancy rate in the Pavilion was 80 percent, the East Atrium was closed, and GSA had stopped charging Wells Fargo rent because no income was being generated. Realizing that a retail/office combination was not going to make money, GSA began negotiating with Collins Equities/Wells Fargo to cancel the lease. GSA by now had realized that if retail space was to be retained, it would need to open onto Pennsylvania Avenue NW. But the agency also was considered scrapping the retail floors and turning them into office space or getting rid of both retail and office space to allow the structure to be developed as a hotel. The hotel option was proving far more appealing than in the early 1980s because of the agency's overwhelmingly positive experience in allowing Kimpton Hotels to transform the 170,000-square-foot (16,000 m^{2}) vacant Tariff Commission Building into a 172-room luxury Hotel Monaco.

On December 28, 2000, GSA submitted the plan for the Old Post Office, as required by the Omnibus Consolidated and Emergency Supplemental Appropriations Act of 1999. On June 15, 2001, Senators Robert Smith, Harry Reid, Ben Nighthorse Campbell, and Byron Dorgan sent a letter to GSA giving consent for GSA to expend such funds as necessary to acquire by purchase the leasehold rights of the lease at the Old Post Office, if certain conditions were followed.

In 2002, lobbyist Jack Abramoff engaged in extensive illegal discussions with GSA chief of staff David Safavian an attempt to secure the lease on the structure for a Native American tribal client. Abramoff took Safavian on an all-expenses-paid golf trip to Scotland, during which time they discussed turning the lease over to the unidentified tribe. Savafian was later convicted of perjury for lying about his relationship with Abramoff.

The GSA issued a Request for Expression of Interest in 2004 for developing the Old Post Office Building. Several companies expressed interest, but GSA did not proceed further.

Beginning in 2002, a major push was made to convert the building into the National Women's History Museum and a bill to do so passed in the United States Senate in 2005. However, local developers, city residents, and members of the House of Representatives were angry that the building would be given away for free. The bill was reintroduced in the 109th United States Congress, although this time the women's museum asked for only the East Atrium. This effort, too, was unsuccessful, even though the East Atrium had broken floor tiles and unfinished interior construction that exposed beams and left gaping holes instead of storefronts.

In March 2005, GSA issued a request for information (RFI) and received more than 20 responses. However, the agency did not receive approval from the Office of Management and Budget (OMB) to proceed to a request for proposals (RFP). OMB did not believe that the responses to the RFI showed that redevelopment was in the best financial interest of the federal government, however.

In June 2006, as a result of the Mid-Atlantic United States flood of 2006, record-setting rainfall of 12.11 inches (308 mm) fell on Washington. The basement of the Old Post Office Building flooded, as did the William Jefferson Clinton Federal Building (headquarters of the Bureau of Alcohol, Tobacco, Firearms and Explosives), the Herbert C. Hoover Building (headquarters of the United States Department of Commerce), the Internal Revenue Service Building, the National Archives Building, and the Robert F. Kennedy Department of Justice Building. The Old Post Office Building, one of those on higher ground, reopened after two days. Most of the other buildings remained closed for a week.

In 2007, GSA estimated, that it would cost more than $100 million to modernize the structure. GSA also said that while it earned $5.4 million in rent at the Old Post Office Building in 2007, it spent $11.9 million on administrative and maintenance, for a loss of $6.5 million.

In 2008, Eleanor Holmes Norton, D.C.'s Delegate to Congress, introduced the "Old Post Office Building Redevelopment Act of 2008" (H.R. 5001) to require GSA move faster on issuing a request for proposals. During hearings before the Subcommittee on Economic Development, Public Buildings and Emergency Management of the House Committee on Transportation and Infrastructure, members of Congress singled out the Old Post Office Building for under-utilization. The legislation passed the House on June 23, and the Senate on September 26. President George W. Bush signed it into law (P.L. 110–359) on October 8. As enacted, the Redevelopment Act required the GSA to proceed with redevelopment of the Old Post Office Building and relocate all federal tenants. It required the GSA to report to the appropriate House and Senate committees regarding any redevelopment agreement, and barred any redevelopment plan from coming into force until 30 days of a continuous session of Congress had passed.

On July 12, 2008, the National Capital Planning Commission issued its National Capital Framework, a plan designed to govern development in Washington, for the next 50 years. The plan was supported by the United States Commission of Fine Arts, the federal agency with legislative authority to approve the aesthetic design of all major buildings in the D.C. metropolitan area. The National Capital Framework specifically asked that the Old Post Office Building be renovated in order to improve public amenities and support the ongoing revitalization of Pennsylvania Avenue.

By October 2010, no major redevelopment goals had been met. The House Transportation and Infrastructure Committee strongly criticized GSA in a report for mismanaging the Old Post Office Building. The report specifically accused GSA of not moving to redevelop the property during a real estate boom in 2006. When the boom ended, GSA was stuck with the property, and the House committee accused the agency of losing more than $25 million on maintenance rather than generating income. With pressure building on the White House to deal with billions of dollars' worth of excess or underutilized federal property, the Barack Obama administration said it would take action to more quickly dispose of property like the Old Post Office. Rather than sell property at fire sale prices, the administration created a new independent advisory panel to help create a disposal plan for each individual building. D.C. area lawmakers pressed the advisory panel to act immediately on the Old Post Office. Douglas Firstenberg, a principal with StonebridgeCarras, a real estate property management firm that helped the federal government lease buildings, said that historic preservation restrictions and the large number of existing tenants made redevelopment difficult.

==== Trump International Hotel ====
In March 2011, a new RFP was issued by GSA. In all, GSA received 10 bids, most of which were hotels. Among the proposals were a luxury hotel and a National Museum of the Jewish People. Other bidders included The Trump Organization, Carpenter, Monument Realty, JBG Smith, and a partnership of Hilton Worldwide and Metropolitan Partnership, Ltd.

On February 6, 2012, GSA announced that it had chosen The Trump Organization as the potential redeveloper of the Old Post Office Building. The company partnered with Colony Capital, a private equity firm, in its bid. The Trump Organization bid pledged to spend $200 million to turn the structure into a 250-room (later sources said 261-room) luxury hotel. Much of the investment would be in cash, not debt. The Trump Organization tentatively agreed to pay GSA $3 million a year in rent.

The Trumps stated that the hotel would include a conference center, spa, three high-end restaurants, and a 35,000-square-foot (3,300 m^{2}) meeting and banquet facility. The company also pledged to create a small museum dedicated to the history of the building and the Bells of Congress, and to maintain the historic exterior.

Local residents and advocates of historic preservation expressed a number of concerns about the successful Trump bid. Preservationists stated that Trump would not respect the historic nature of the building and had almost no experience renovating historic properties.

In response, government officials stated that the United States Commission of Fine Arts (whose secretary signaled heavy scrutiny for any changes) would need to approve any redesign. Trump dismissed concerns that he lacked experience with historic buildings, pointing to his redevelopment of Grand Central Terminal in New York City and the Mar-a-Lago Club in Palm Beach, Florida. The Trump Organization bid touted the involvement of Arthur Cotton Moore, a noted local architect who had earlier renovated historic buildings within the area and had helped design the Old Post Office Building renovations during the 1970s.

Moore, however, left the effort for health reasons within a year. Another preservationist architect, John Cullinane, who had been working on the project resigned "because I couldn't support what they were doing to the building... [t]hey were covering up or tearing out everything that was historic...".

Some city residents worried that Trump would block access to the clock tower. However, the National Park Service stated that it would retain control over the clock tower and observation deck and would keep them open for tours.

Washington Post business columnist Steven Pearlstein questioned the financial wisdom of selecting Trump/Colony Capital, given Trump's extensive problems with bankruptcy and Colony Capital's current problems keeping its hotel properties out of receivership. Pearlstein and local hoteliers argued that the market would not support the room rates that Trump intended to charge, and therefore would not be able to support the excessive amount of redevelopment money and rent that Trump was paying for the property.

Robert Peck, Commissioner of the GSA's Public Building Service, defended the selection, arguing that the Trump/Colony Capital bid was by far the best in terms of financial commitment, experience in renovating and managing properties, and quality of design. Peck dismissed criticism about Trump's numerous past bankruptcies, noting that these mostly concerned casinos rather than hotels. In addition, Washington Post business reporters Petula Dvorak and Jonathan O'Connell expressed their opinion that the new Trump hotel would help spark an economic renaissance in its downtown Washington neighborhood.

In March 2012, The Washington Post reported that Monument Realty offered a base rent much higher than that of The Trump Organization. Monument and development partner Angelo, Gordon & Co. proposed a 260,000-square-foot (24,000 m^{2}) office building with a media center on the first three floors. It also proposed demolishing the annex in favor of a parking garage. Monument Realty bid for the building with a lease price of $5.1 million annually, with rent increases based on the building's performance. The Trump Organization, however, offered $200 million in redevelopment dollars, while Monument would have provided just $116.5 million. GSA scored submission based on experience and past performance, design concept, financial capacity and capability, and initial development investment. It was unclear, therefore, that Monument's bid was superior to The Trump Organization's bid.

Another bidder, BP-Metropolitan Investors, filed an official protest in April 2012 against GSA for awarding the redevelopment to The Trump Organization. The bidding group, which included Hilton Worldwide, said GSA failed to take into account Trump's repeated bankruptcies and unrealistic economic assumptions. GSA said Metropolitan lost the award because it offered to spend only $140 million to renovate the building. GSA responded to the protest by noting that since the redevelopment was not a procurement, there were no legal grounds for protesting its decision.

In the summer of 2012, The Trump Organization asked the District of Columbia to waive possessory interest taxes on the Old Post Office Building. The possessory interest tax was estimated at $3 million in 2012, although it would likely be far more once the property was fully redeveloped. D.C. tax officials denied the waiver. Pedro Ribeiro, a spokesperson for Mayor Vincent C. Gray, said, "It was never part of the bid proposal that the project would not be subject to the tax." David Orowitz, the Vice President for Acquisitions and Development in The Trump Organization, said that the denial of tax waiver was not a surprise and would not change the financial calculations of the company's bid. Donald Trump later denied seeking any tax waiver.

As the clock ticked on the one-year deadline to finalize a deal with GSA, The Trump Organization hired Streetsense, a real estate and retail design firm, to select restaurants and retailers for the Old Post Office Pavilion. Trump chose the company over local real estate developer Douglas Jemal and retail design firm Ashkenazy Acquisition. Tiffany & Co. was among the retailers the company talked to.

Six development meetings were held among GSA, the CFA, D.C. government officials, and The Trump Organization between February and December 2012. Determining what was acceptable redevelopment was critical if a final lease agreement was to be signed. The Trump Organization's new design team consisted of the firms Beyer Blinder Belle and WDG Architecture (formerly Edwin Weihe & Associates). The Trump Organization proposed extending 11th Street NW south of Pennsylvania Avenue NW. City officials asked that a half-block of C Street NW south of the hotel be reopened with redevelopment money, too, but The Trump Organization declined the request. The architectural team proposed adding retail on all four corners of the Old Post Office Building, and building a new mezzanine level inside it (with a restaurant on top and a spa and fitness center below). Historic preservation agencies refused to allow various types of canopies or signs bearing the hotel's name along Pennsylvania Avenue, and six alternative designs for the East Atrium were rejected out of hand by the CFA. But still under consideration was a proposal to convert the lower level of the East Atrium into parking with the upper level retained as a ballroom.

By late January 2013, no final lease agreement had been reached. However, both The Trump Organization and GSA said that they were closing in on a deal, and GSA said it was unlikely to reopen the bidding process if one was not reached by the 12-month deadline. Trump officials and GSA attributed the delay to the length of the lease, which created complexities that needed time to be resolved. GSA also said there were also unique issues raised by the building's historic status. Nonetheless, federal law required the GSA to reach a deal by June 2013 or reopen the bidding process.

Donald Trump asserted that a deal was "weeks" away in mid-April 2013. But even as he said that, contrary to rumor, he was not seeking to renegotiate his initial agreement with GSA, The Trump Organization re-evaluated its partnership with Colony Capital. Trump said his company was likely to either replace Colony or finance the entire redevelopment deal in cash. GSA officials said any such change would not affect the negotiations.

The Trump Organization cleared several regulatory hurdles in April and May 2013. On April 28, the Commission of Fine Arts gave non-binding, preliminary approval to the company's draft redevelopment plan. On May 16, GSA completed an environmental impact assessment (EIA) which concluded the redevelopment would have no significant adverse historic, land use, or transportation impacts. The EIA also concluded that the hotel would generate about $6.5 million per year in hotel bed tax revenue and $1.5 million in sales tax revenue.

On June 4, GSA reached a final agreement with The Trump Organization regarding redevelopment of the Old Post Office building. The Trump Organization negotiated a 60-year lease under which it paid $250,000 in rent per month, with annual increases tied to the Consumer Price Index. Rent payments were to begin either eight months after construction started or 20 months after the lease's signing, whichever came first. The company had the option to extend the lease another 40 years. The Trump Organization agreed to spend at least $200 million redeveloping the property, with Trump using his personal funds to pay for the redevelopment. To allay concerns by critics that he too often defaulted on developments, Trump agreed to provide a $40 million personal guaranty as well as a "bad acts" (to cover failure to pay taxes, fraud, or other forms of misconduct). The Trump Organization agreed to pay all taxes, although the lease did not bar the company from seeking a historic preservation tax credit.

The Trump Organization agreed to turn the Old Post Office building into a 260-room hotel (although some sources said there would be 267 rooms, some said 270, some said 271, and others 275). Many of the rooms would have 25-foot (7.6 m) high ceilings, although most ceilings would be 14-to-16-foot (4.3 to 4.9 m) high. The average room was expected to be 600 square feet (56 m^{2}) in size, and the hotel would have a higher percentage of suites and larger-than-average rooms to draw corporate executives and diplomats.

In what were formerly the offices of the Postmaster General of the United States, the company planned two "presidential suites" of 3,000 square feet (280 m^{2}) each with 16-foot (4.9 m) ceilings. Each presidential suite would have a working fireplace, sauna, steam room, walk-in closet, direct-access elevators, and views of Pennsylvania Avenue NW and the National Mall.

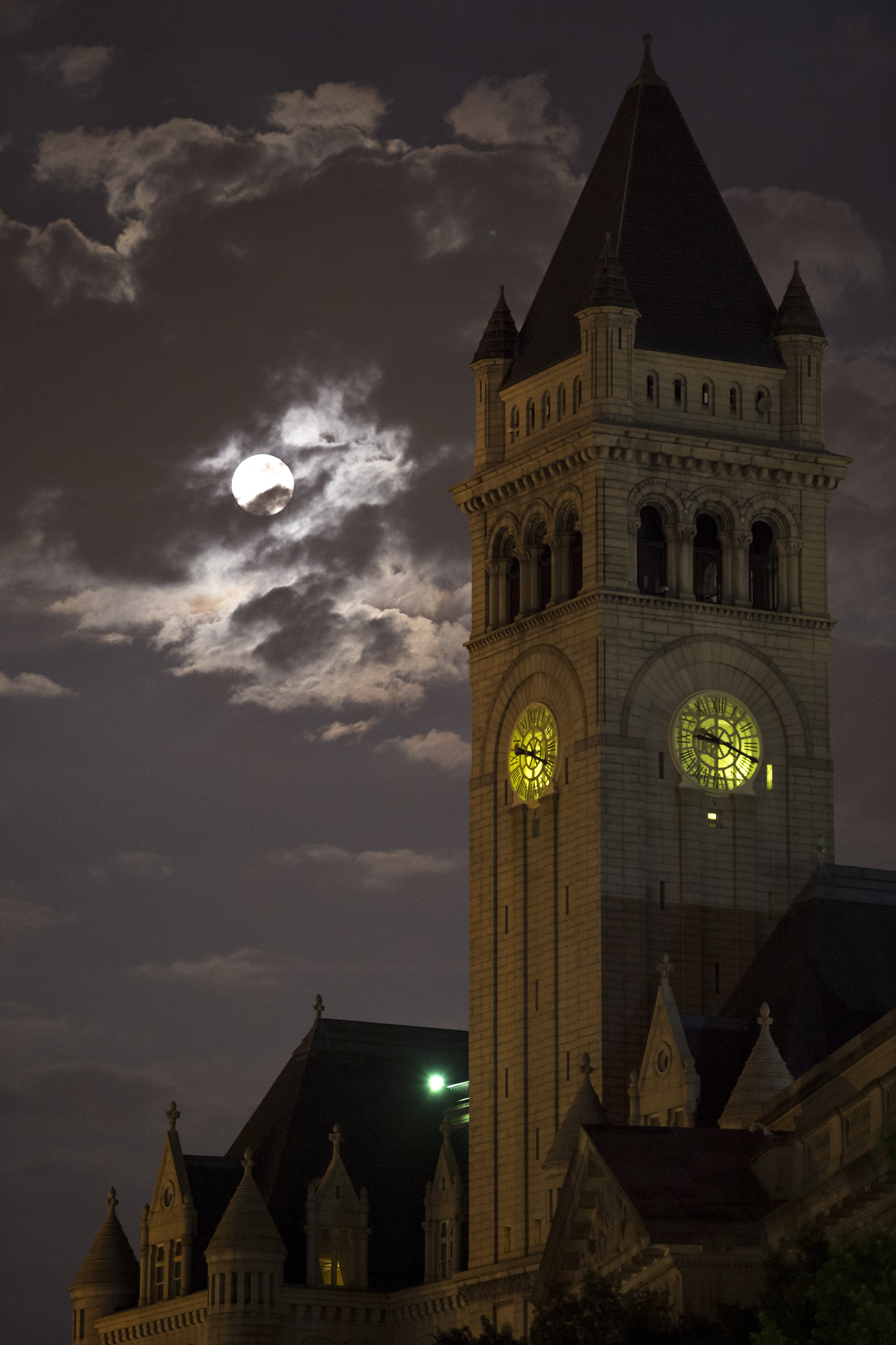
The clock tower at night in 2014

Redevelopment plans included an art gallery, café, bar, fitness center, library, lounge with fountain, meeting rooms, spa, two or three upscale restaurants, several luxury retail shops, a 4,000-square-foot (370 m^{2}) Mar-a-Lago brand spa, and a small museum about the building, its clock tower, and its bells. The Trump Organization agreed to continue to allow the public access to the clock tower and observation platform. The National Park Service agreed to operate the clock tower tours. The exterior of the building (including the multicolor brick and granite pavement designed by Aleksandra Kasuba) would be preserved in its historic state. Pending approval by regulatory authorities, The Trump Organization proposed building a floor over the ground level (turning the mezzanine into a floor), although the grand staircase would remain. Most of the retail would occupy the ground and second floor, while the historic Stamp Counter on the east side of the ground floor would become the hotel registration desk.

Major changes were made to the 86,000-square-foot (8,000 m^{2}) East Atrium and the streets around it. The Trump Organization intended to convert the 34,400-square-foot (3,200 m^{2}) basement level into a 150-space parking garage, with a 31,600-to-35,000-square-foot (2,940 to 3,250 m^{2}) ballroom on the ground level and 20,000 square feet (1,900 m^{2}) of conference room space on the second floor. The ballroom's size would make it the largest in any luxury hotel in the city. The city agreed to extend 11th Street NW into the Federal Triangle south to C Street NW to provide access for automobiles. The Old Post Office Building's entrance on 11th Street NW would again be the structure's main entrance (opening the door on the long-closed side of the building). Pending final regulatory approval, a new steel and glass canopy will be constructed over the new entrance and a "Trump International Hotel" sign suspended inside the entrance arch.

The 12th Street NW entrance would become the secondary entrance, providing public access to the restaurants and retail stores. Awnings would be over windows and the entrance on the ground floor, and a sign for the hotel added over the entrance. Outdoor seating would be added on the 12th Street NW, 11th Street NW, and Pennsylvania Avenue NW sides of the building. C Street NW would not be reopened to automobile traffic. The Trump Organization said it would remove the ahistoric glass and steel ground floor storefront on the C Street side and expand and renovate the public plaza there by adding outdoor seating and a performance space.

With the lease signed, Ivanka Trump said construction would begin immediately after the building was turned over to The Trump Organization.

On November 14, 2016, the National Park Service approved Part 2 of the Trump organization's application for a tax credit in the amount of 20% of the rehabilitation cost of the building, estimated in the original application at $160 million. The final step would be the filing of Part 3 to collect the tax credit on the actual cost upon the completion of the construction.

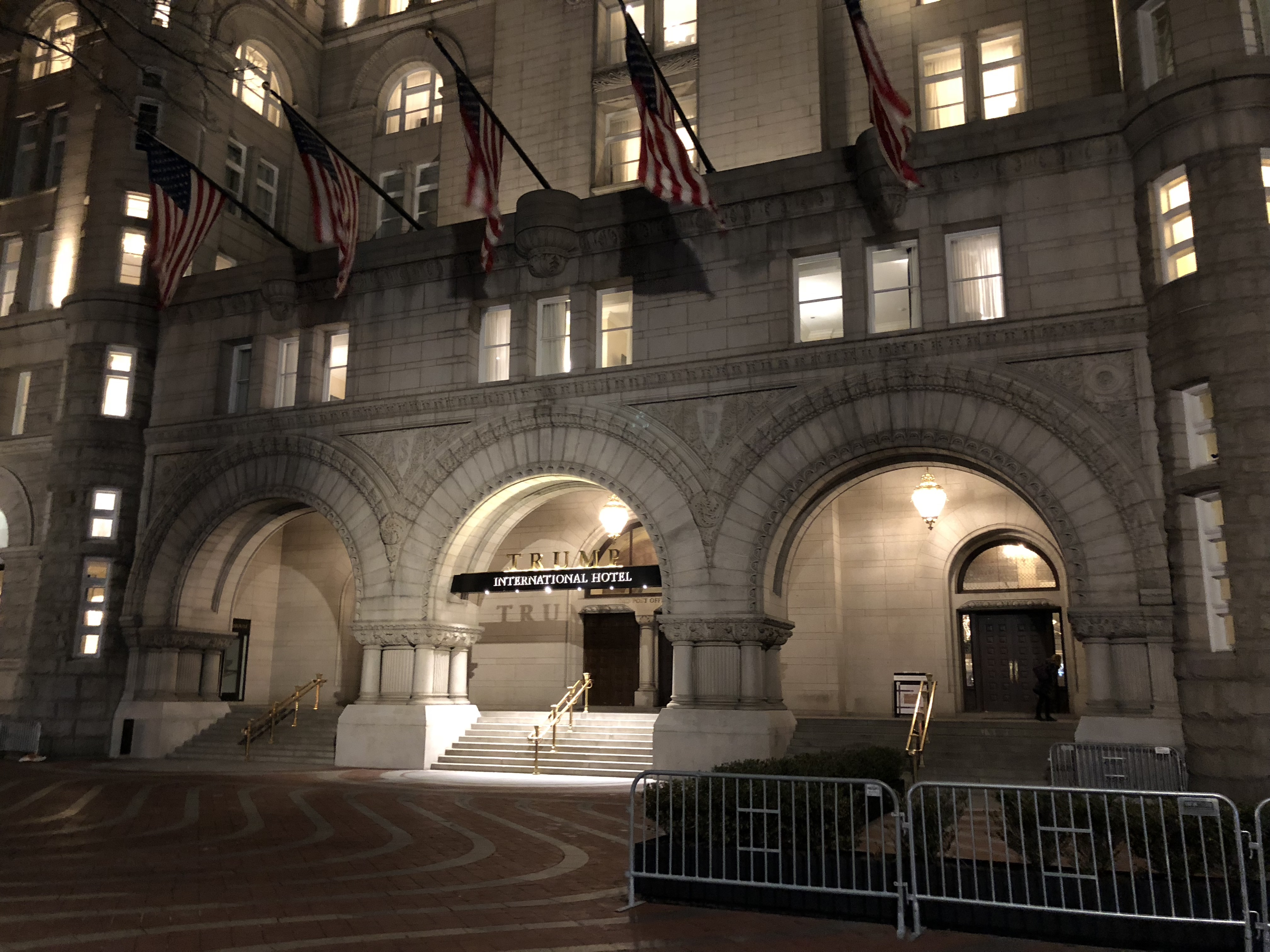
Entrance to Old Post Office Pavilion in 2018 when it served as the Trump International Hotel

Under the 2008 redevelopment law, Congress had 30 days to disapprove the lease or it would become final. Anticipating no problems from the legislature, GSA began relocating the existing federal tenants in the Old Post Office Building.

Another major regulatory hurdle was cleared by The Trump Organization in early July 2013. The staff of the National Capital Planning Commission recommended to the agency that it approve the redevelopment plans. The NCPC staff report suggested that GSA and The Trump Organization continue to work on exterior signage designs to ensure they are appropriate. The full commission approved the staff report and gave preliminary approval to the company's building plans. The NCPC asked the organization to return in fall 2013 with final plans.

On August 5, 2013, Congress allowed the lease between GSA and The Trump Organization to go into force. The Washington Business Journal reported that the lease called for a 263-room (another source said 270-room) hotel and for Trump to spend $250 million on renovations. The D.C. Preservation League (the former Don't Tear It Down) said it supported the Trump redevelopment of the site.

The Trump Organization hired the interior design firm of Hirsch Bedner Associates to work on the interior of the Old Post Office Building. The $200 million renovation began on May 1, 2014, with the closure of the clock tower. Changes to the structure's exterior included the removal of the words "OLD POST OFFICE" from the central arch of the building's main entrance and the placement beneath that arch of a bar containing the words "TRUMP INTERNATIONAL HOTEL".

The Trump International Hotel Washington, D.C. opened to paying guests with a "soft opening" on September 12, 2016. The hotel's grand opening was celebrated on October 26, 2016.

A December 2016 review in Vanity Fair described the hotel as grand on the outside, a complete disaster and "a frightful dump" on the inside. In December 2016, Luxury Travel Intelligence reviewed the Trump Hotel and found major shortcomings in its service and operations. It called the decor "garish", said that it was not suited to the discerning business traveler, and ranked it as the third worst hotel in the world. On February 20, 2018, the hotel was named to the Forbes Travel Guide Five Star list for 2018 and later that year, it was named to Forbes' inaugural World's Most Luxurious Hotels list. A Condé Nast Traveler article in May 2018 praised the restaurants and the service at the hotel. On February 20, 2019, Forbes Travel Guide renewed the Five Star rating for 2019. The hotel has also achieved the number 1 rating on TripAdvisor.com for all Washington hotels.

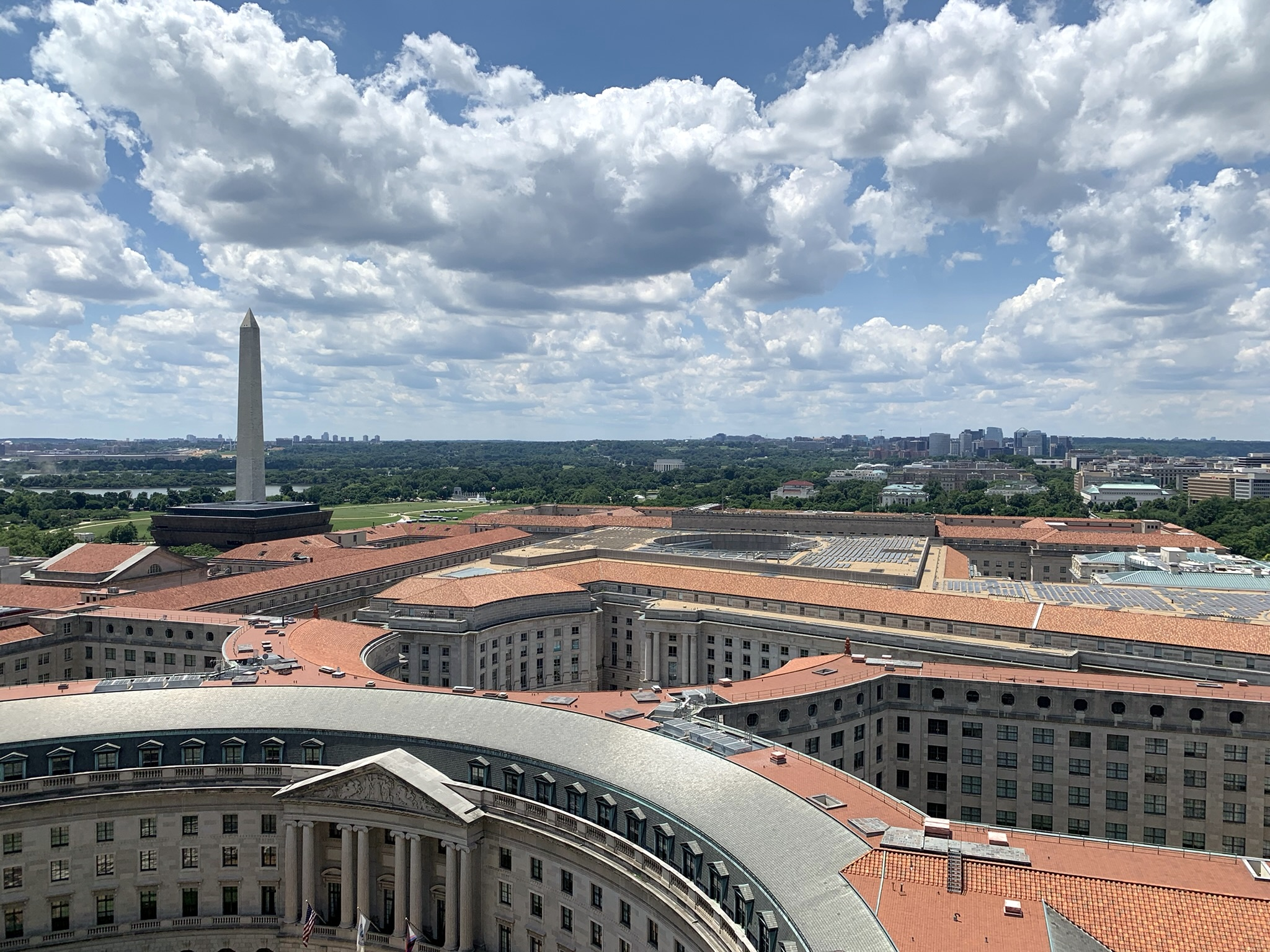
View of the Washington Monument and Northern Virginia in the distance from the clock tower observatory

The Trump Organization initially entered into contracts with chefs José Andrés and Geoffrey Zakarian to open restaurants in the atrium and in the northwest corner of the Organization's planned new hotel. However, both chefs pulled out of the deals after Donald Trump made controversial public comments about Mexicans in June 2015, before the hotel had opened. The ensuing legal disputes were settled in April 2017.

For 16 years until 2015, the Sakura Matsuri-Japanese Street Festival, the largest Japanese Cultural Festival in the United States, took place throughout a spring-time day on Pennsylvania Avenue in front of the Old Post Office Building. The Festival's location enabled the event to be near the route of the annual Cherry Blossom Parade, which traveled nearby along Constitution Avenue during the same day (see National Cherry Blossom Festival).

However, in 2016 and 2017, the Street Festival's organizers were forced to move their event to a distant location in Washington. The Festival's relocation became necessary after the Trump Organization negotiated a deal with the Government of the District of Columbia that requires a 20-foot-wide (6 m) lane on Pennsylvania Avenue to remain open to the Trump International Hotel's customers and valet parking service except during major events such as presidential inaugural parades, thus leaving insufficient space on the Avenue for the festival's activities and for those of other events formerly held near the building.

On the day before Trump's 2017 inauguration, Donald Trump and Michael Pence attended a "Leadership Luncheon" with his cabinet nominees and major donors at the Presidential Ballroom in the Trump International Hotel for which attendees paid $1 million. Ivanka Trump helped resolve disputes between the Inauguration Committee and the hotel's staff.

After Donald J. Trump was inaugurated as President of the United States, the Trump International Hotel became the focus of legal controversy. World leaders stated Trump was encouraging visiting emissaries to stay at Trump hotels. Trump family members, such as Ivanka, profited from their stake in the hotel while Donald Trump was president.

After he left office, the House Oversight Committee continued to investigate, publicly revealing in October 2021 that the Trump International Hotel had received about $3.7 million from foreign governments, potentially violating the Foreign Emoluments Clause of the U.S. Constitution. Additionally, according to the congressional committee, the hotel had a net loss of over $70 million during Trump's presidency. To address this loss, another of Trump's companies, DJT Holdings LLC, loaned over $27 million to the hotel, only a small portion of which the hotel repaid. Most of the loan was eventually converted to capital contributions.

===== Emoluments Clause lawsuits =====
====== CREW v. Trump ======
In January 2017, a lawsuit against Trump was brought by Citizens for Responsibility and Ethics in Washington (CREW) and several prominent legal scholars—including Laurence Tribe of Harvard Law School, former White House Special Counsel for Ethics and Government Reform Norman L. Eisen, Erwin Chemerinsky of the UC Irvine, and Zephyr Teachout of Fordham University. The lawsuit argues that Trump is in violation of the Foreign Emoluments Clause of the United States because his hotels, as well as other businesses, are accepting payments from foreign guests. In January 2021, the U.S. Supreme Court instructed the lower courts to dismiss the case as moot, because Trump was no longer president.

====== District of Columbia and Maryland v. Trump ======
On June 12, 2017, the Attorney General Karl Racine of the District of Columbia and Attorney General Brian Frosh of Maryland filed a joint lawsuit in the United States District Court for the District of Maryland against President Trump alleging both foreign and domestic emoluments clause violations of the United States Constitution. Similar to CREW v. Trump, Attorneys General Racine and Frosh cite The Trump Organization receipt of foreign money at Trump Hotels and other businesses as a violation of the constitution, and that this transaction negatively affects the economy of D.C. and Maryland, as well as the best interests of the American public. In January 2021, the U.S. Supreme Court instructed the lower courts to dismiss the case as moot, because Trump was no longer president.

====== Blumenthal v. Trump ======
On June 14, 2017, led by Senator Richard Blumenthal and Representative John Conyers, Jr., more than a third of the voting members of Congress filed a lawsuit alleging violations of the Foreign Emoluments Clause seeking the right to be informed of and approve of gifts from foreign governments before they are received. The lawsuit makes specific allegations concerning attempts to solicit foreign governments at the Old Post Office building. In 2020, the U.S. Court of Appeals for the District of Columbia held that individual members of Congress lacked standing to bring action against the President where they sought declaratory and injunctive relief for alleged violations of the Foreign Emoluments Clause.

====== Trump response ======
President Donald Trump responded to the emolument clause allegations by outlining a plan where payments from foreign guests would be paid into the U.S. Treasury and to the GSA contract issues by placing his holdings into a trust directed by his children. This plan was criticized by Walter M. Shaub, the Director of the U.S. Office of Government Ethics, who stated that "the plan does not comport with the tradition of our Presidents over the past 40 years" and was at odds with past practice, since "...every President in modern times has taken the strong medicine of divestiture."

===== GSA contract =====
The Trump Organization's lease contract with the GSA, signed in 2013, provides that "no elected official of the government ... shall be admitted to any share or part of this Lease, or to any benefit that may arise therefrom." In a letter to the GSA, Citizens for Responsibility and Ethics in Washington wrote: "Elected government officials are barred from receiving any benefit under the lease, and now that Mr. Trump has been sworn in today as President of the United States, Trump Old Post Office LLC, a company he largely owns, is in violation of the lease's conflicts-of-interest provision." After Trump's election as president, Democrats took the position that he "must fully divest himself of all financial interests in the lease to be in compliance with the legal agreement." In February 2017, Senators Tom Carper and Claire McCaskill (the Democratic ranking members of the Homeland Security and Governmental Affairs Committee and its Permanent Subcommittee on Investigations, respectively) wrote a letter to the GSA inspector general, writing: "Since President Trump took the oath of office, the Trump Old Post Office, LLC appears to be in breach of the plain language of the lease agreement." They requested an inspector general inquiry. In March 2017 the GSA announced that they considered the tenant of the property to be in full compliance with the terms of the lease, following a reorganization of the hotel's organizational structure and the placing of the property in a revocable trust. On August 30, 2017, Bloomberg BNA reported that both the Government Accountability Office (GAO) and the GSA Inspector General's Office of Inspections had confirmed that they were evaluating GSA's management and administration of the lease. In January 2019, GSA General Counsel Jack St. John agreed with the single recommendation from Carol F. Ochoa's 47-page report in which the President's business interest in the Trump International Hotel at the Old Post Office building might constitute a violation of the emoluments clause and this might cause a breach of the lease.

===== Political protests =====
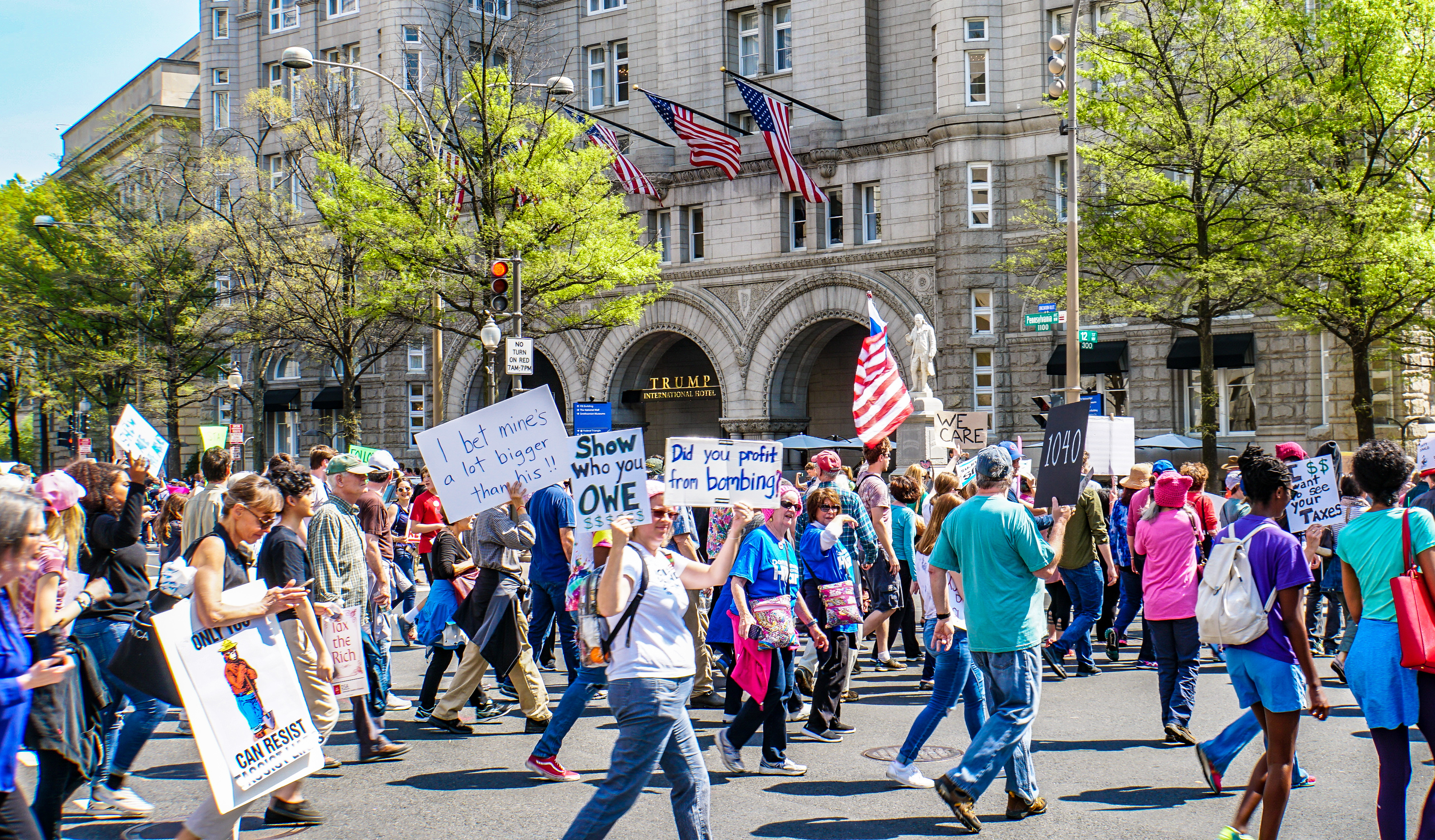
Protesters at Trump Hotel on April 15, 2017

During the presidency of Donald Trump, the Old Post Office became a frequent location of political protests. During the evening of May 15, 2017, artist Robin Bell projected messages onto the hotel's facade that stated, among other things, "Emoluments Welcome," along with an animation of the flags of nations in which Trump had business projects. On January 13, 2018, after Trump reportedly used the word "shithole" at a meeting, Bell projected onto the facade the message "Not a D.C. resident?" / "Need a place to stay?" / "Try our shithole". Following the March for Our Lives anti-gun violence rally on March 24, 2018, many rally-goers left their signs by the hotel.

===== Waldorf Astoria Washington DC =====
In 2021, the Trump Organization agreed to sell the lease on the building for $375 million to the investment firm CGI Merchant Group, which planned to rebrand the hotel as a Waldorf Astoria. The Trump Organization would profit $100 million from the deal. The New York Times reported in July 2025 that the buyer had borrowed $28 million from Trump to cover closing costs, then defaulted on the loan. Trump had invested $100 million in the building and made $79 million from the sale after taxes.

In February 2022, the House Oversight Committee sought to prevent Trump from making the sale. The committee wrote to the GSA, arguing that Trump was suspected of having made "false or misleading information to the federal government" by giving GSA "at least one financial statement with possible material misrepresentations". The committee said Trump should not be "rewarded" for "seeking to profit off the presidency." GSA could have potentially prevented the sale of the lease by terminating the lease before the Trump Organization completed the sale.

The hotel closed on May 11, 2022, after its sale to CGI Merchant Group. The removal of the Trump signage on the building's facade drew extensive international media coverage.

The hotel reopened under its new name on June 1, 2022.

====== Foreclosure and auction ======
On August 5, 2024, CGI Merchant Group's lender foreclosed on the leasehold, due to CGI defaulting on its loan. The lender, BDT & MSD Partners, auctioned the leasehold, but did not receive any bids. The lender submitted their own bid for $100 million, subsequently taking possession of the property. Hilton's contract to manage the property continued. BDT & MSD Partners purchased the property in June 2026.

== Clock tower and bells ==
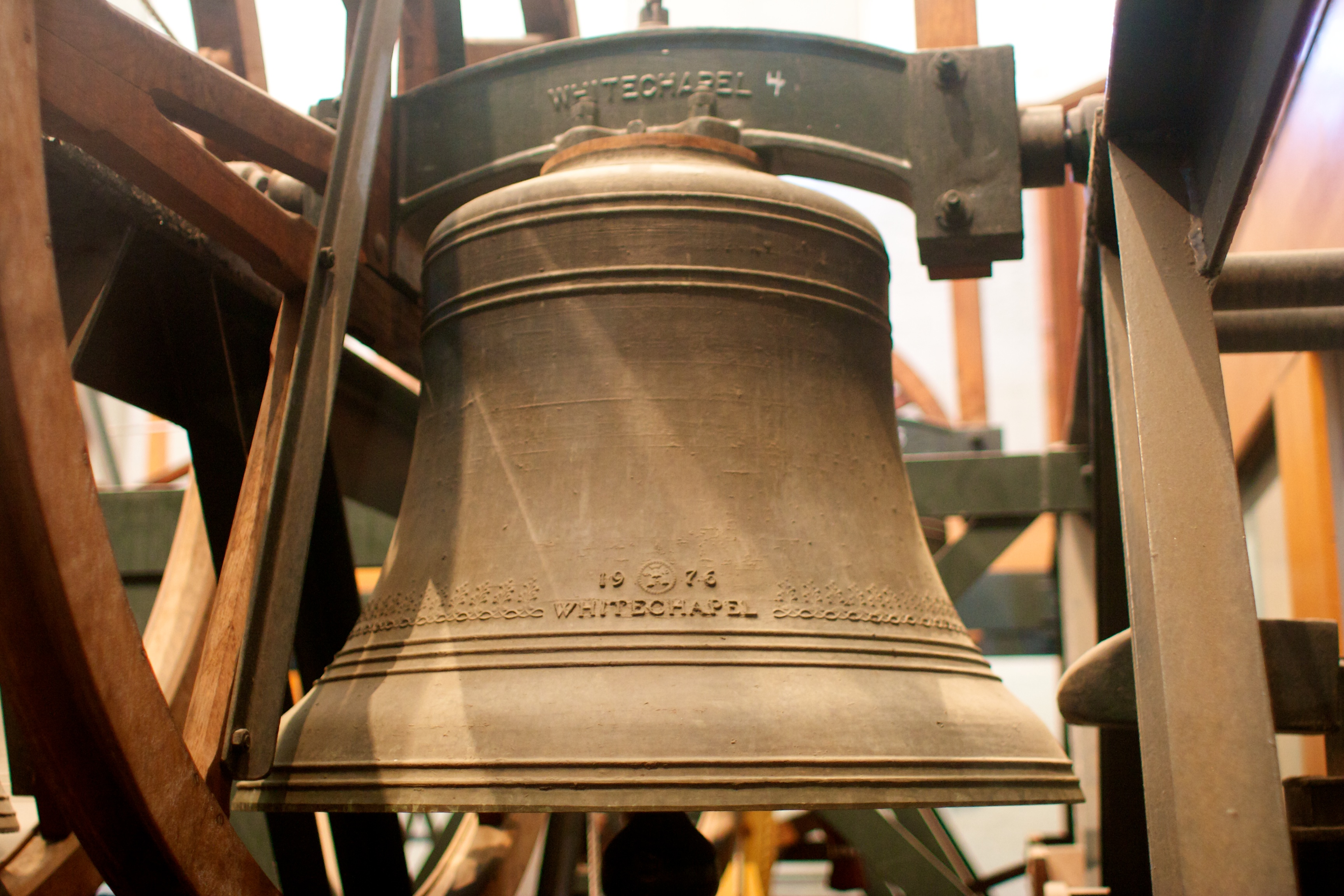
One of the Bells of Congress hanging in the clock tower of the Old Post Office Building in 2012

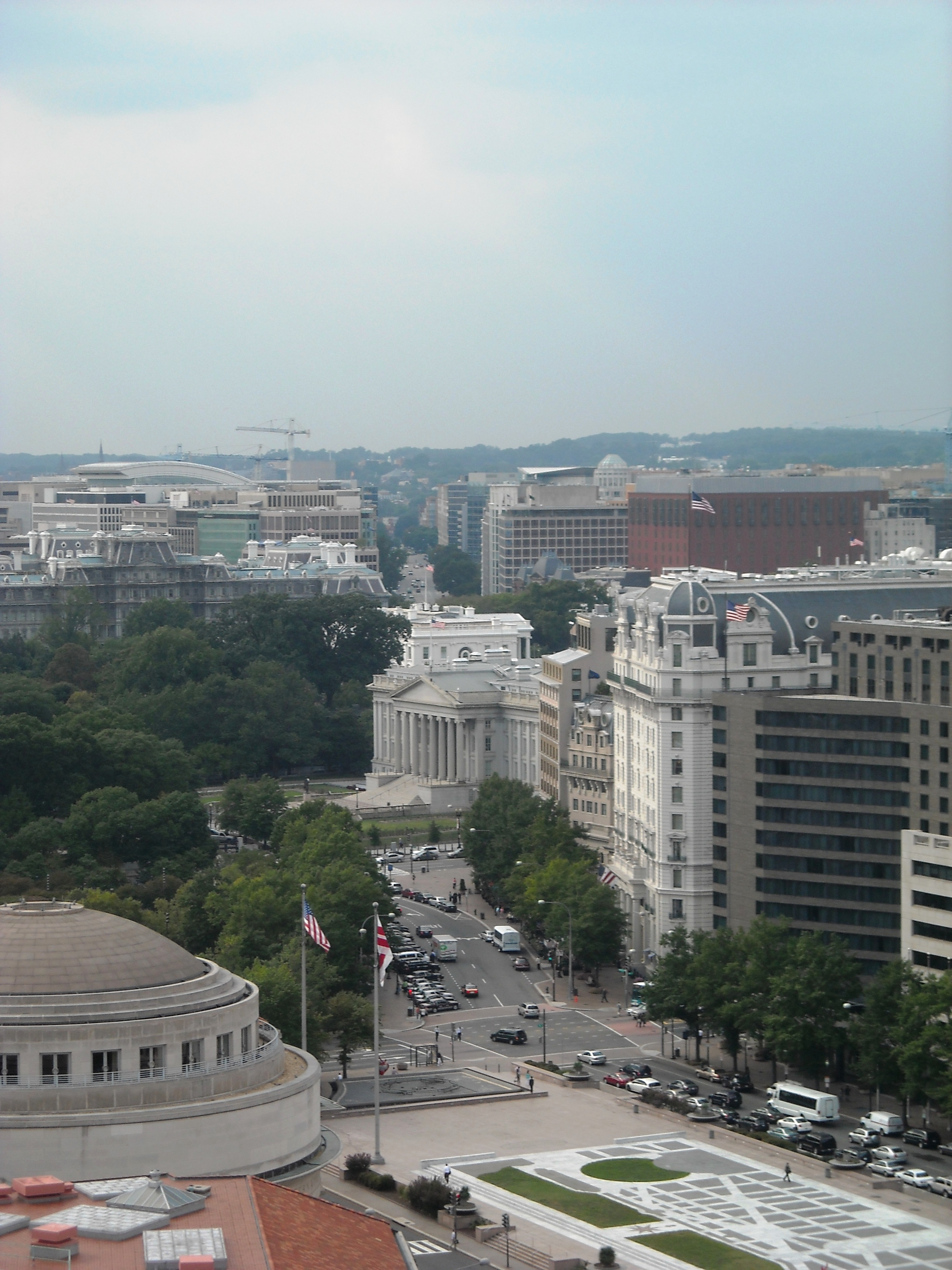
View of the White House, U.S. Treasury Building, and Willard Hotel from the clock tower observatory

The Old Post Office Building's 315-foot (96 m) clock tower is the third-highest building in Washington, after the Washington Monument and the Basilica of the National Shrine of the Immaculate Conception. The tower's 270-foot-high (82 m) observation deck offers panoramic views of the city and its surroundings. The tower includes an exhibit depicting the building's long struggle for survival and a view of the interior workings of the illuminated clock.

The Clock Tower houses the Bells of Congress (also known as the Ditchley Bells), which the Whitechapel Bell Foundry cast and are replicas of bells in Westminster Abbey. Sir David Wills, founder of the Ditchley Foundation, donated the bells to the United States in commemoration of the nation's 1976 Bicentennial. However, the bells were not brought to the United States and installed in the Clock Tower until 1983.

The 10-bell peal consists of bells ranging from 300 to 3,000 pounds (140 to 1,360 kg) and from 2 to 4.5 feet (0.61 to 1.37 m) in diameter. Their composition is 78 percent copper and 22 percent tin. Each bell features the Great Seal of the United States, the Great Seal of the Realm, and an image of the flower London Pride in relief. Because the tower was not designed to hold bells, the architectural firm of Skidmore, Owings and Merrill and the structural engineering firm Cagley & Associates were hired to modify the tower so that it could accommodate the weight of the bells and the stress of their swings.

The Washington Ringing Society sounds the Bells of Congress every Thursday evening for practice night and also on special occasions. The official bells of the United States Congress, they are one of the largest sets of change ringing bells in North America. Tower visitors can see the colored ropes (the 'sally') that the bell-ringers pull to sound the bells but not the bells themselves, although plans are in the works to open a viewing area for the bells as well.

Prior to the 2014 renovation, National Park Service rangers provided tours of the Clock Tower. After stopping for three years during the tower's renovation, the ranger tours resumed in February 2017. The service continued during the United States federal government shutdown of 2018–2019 of "all but the most essential" federal government services, including the National Park Service.

== See also ==
- List of United States post offices
- Architecture of Washington, D.C.

== Bibliography ==
- Appewhite, E.J. Washington Itself: An Informal Guide to the Capital of the United States. Lanham, Md.: Madison Books, 1993.
- Bednar, Michael J. L'Enfant's Legacy: Public Open Spaces in Washington. Baltimore: Johns Hopkins University Press, 2006.
- Benedetto, Robert; Donovan, Jane; and Du Vall, Kathleen. Historical Dictionary of Washington. Lanham, Md.: Rowman & Littlefield, 2003.
- Burke, Susan and Powers, Alice Leccese. DK Eyewitness Travel Guide: Washington, D.C. London: Dorling Kindersley, 2012.
- DeFerrari, John. Lost Washington, D.C. Charleston, S.C.: History Press, 2011.
- Evelyn, Douglas E.; Dickson, Paul; and Ackerman, S.J. On This Spot: Pinpointing the Past in Washington, D.C. 3rd rev. ed. Sterling, Va.: Capital Books, 2008.
- Fodor's Flashmaps Washington, D.C. New York: Fodor's, 2004.
- Glazer, Nathan. From a Cause to a Style: Modernist Architecture's Encounter With the American City. Princeton, N.J.: Princeton University Press, 2007.
- Goode, James. "Introduction: The Creation of Monumental Washington in the 1930s". In Wentzel, Volkmar Kurt and Goode, James. Washington by Night: Vintage Photographs From the 30s. Reprint ed. James Goode, ed. Golden, Colo.: Fulcrum Publishing, 1998.
- Gutheim, Frederick Albert and Lee, Antoinette Josephine. Worthy of the Nation: Washington, D.C., From L'Enfant to the National Capital Planning Commission. 2d ed. Baltimore: Johns Hopkins University Press, 2006.
- Hess, Stephen. "The Federal Executive". In Daniel Patrick Moynihan: The Intellectual in Public Life. Robert A. Katzmann, ed. 2d ed. Washington, D.C.: Woodrow Wilson Center Press, 2004.
- Hodgson, Godfrey. The Gentleman From New York: Daniel Patrick Moynihan: A Biography. New York: Houghton Mifflin Harcourt, 2000.
- Moeller, Gerard Martin and Feldblyum, Boris. AIA Guide to the Architecture of Washington, D.C. Baltimore, Md.: Johns Hopkins University Press, 2012.
- Pennoyer, Peter and Walker, Anne. The Architecture of Delano and Aldrich. New York: W.W. Norton, 2003.
- Scott, Pamela and Lee, Antoinette Josephine. Buildings of the District of Columbia. Oxford, U.K.: Oxford University Press, 1993.
- Schrag, Zachary M. The Great Society Subway: A History of the Washington Metro. Baltimore: Johns Hopkins University Press, 2006.
- Sider, Sandra. "Washington, D.C." In The Grove Encyclopedia of American Art. Joan M. Marter, ed. New York: Oxford University Press, 2011.
- Subcommittee on Public Buildings and Grounds. To Review the Proposed Demolition of the Old Post Office Building and Other Landmark Buildings. Committee on Public Works. U.S. Senate. 92d Cong., 1st sess. Washington, D.C.: U.S. Government Printing Office, April 21, 1971.
- Wentzel, Volkmar Kurt and Goode, James. Washington by Night: Vintage Photographs from the 30s. Reprint ed. James Goode, ed. Golden, Colo.: Fulcrum Publishing, 1998.

Records
Preceded by United States Capitol	Tallest Building in Washington, D.C. 1899–1959; 96m	Succeeded by Basilica of the National Shrine of the Immaculate Conception
