= William Marshall Jr. =

American architect (1925–1997)

- Born: November 24, 1925; Ashland, Kentucky
- Died: November 8, 1997 (aged 71); Norfolk, Virginia
- Occupation: Architect
- Awards: Fellow of the American Institute of Architects
- Practice: Lublin, McGaughy & Associates; McGaughy, Marshall & McMillan; MMM Design Group

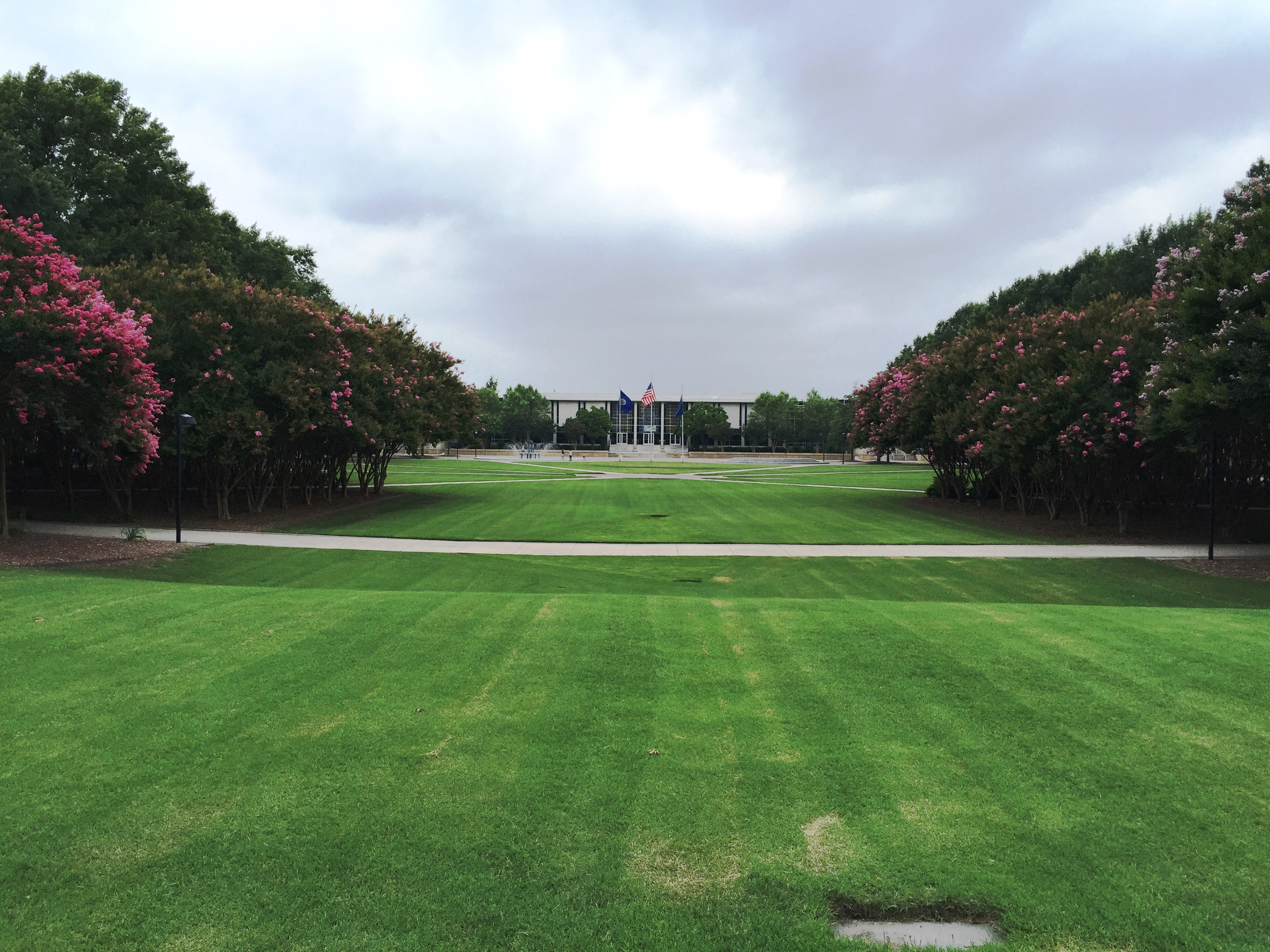
The Webb University Center of Old Dominion University viewed from Kaufman Mall, completed in 1966.

William Marshall Jr. FAIA (1925–1997) was an American architect in practice in Norfolk, Virginia from 1955 to 1984 and was president of the American Institute of Architects for 1975.

== Life and career ==
William Marshall Jr. was born November 24, 1925, in Ashland, Kentucky to William Marshall, a civil engineer, and Lee (Powers) Marshall. The family moved to Virginia shortly thereafter and in 1939 settled permanently in Norfolk. In 1943 he enrolled in the Virginia Military Institute to study engineering, but left in 1944 to enlist in the United States Army. After the war he enrolled in the University of Virginia to study architecture, and graduated with a BS in architecture in 1949. He then enrolled in the MArch program at Columbia University but dropped out after a year to begin work. In 1950 he returned to Norfolk, where he joined the office of Lublin, McGaughy & Associates, architects and engineers, and in 1955 he became a partner. In 1960 the senior partner, Alfred M. Lublin, died, and Marshall became senior architect of the firm. The firm's practice expanded quickly, and by 1962 they had offices in Washington, Honolulu, Orlando, Paris, Livorno and Wiesbaden in addition to the head office in Norfolk. In 1965 the firm was reorganized as McGaughy, Marshall & McMillan. By 1970 they had centralized their foreign practice in an office in Athens with stateside offices in Washington, Richmond, Omaha and Grand Island and in 1981 reorganized as the MMM Design Group with Marshall as president. In addition to conventional architectural and engineering practice, the firm was responsible for master plans for new towns and cities in Africa and Asia. Marshall retired in 1984 but continued to maintain a small consulting practice from an office in Exmore. MMM Design Group survived his retirement by thirty years, but faltered during the Great Recession and ultimately closed in 2014.

Marshall joined the American Institute of Architects (AIA) in 1958 as a member of the Virginia chapter. He served as chapter president for 1969–70 and was a member of several national committees. In 1971 when AIA vice president George Malcolm White was appointed Architect of the Capitol, Marshall was appointed to finish his term. In 1973 he was elected first vice president/president elect for 1974 and president for 1975. As president Marshall focused on strengthening local and state chapters and during the energy crisis advocated for energy efficiency in design and construction. Marshall was elected a fellow of the AIA in 1972 and was elected an honorary member of the Royal Architectural Institute of Canada.

== Personal life ==
Marshall was married in 1951 to Joan Goodyear Ellingston. They had five children, three sons and two daughters. Marshall died November 8, 1997, in Norfolk at the age of 71.

== Architectural works ==
- Southern Shopping Center, 7525 Tidewater Dr, Norfolk, Virginia (1957)
- Master plan and buildings, Joint Forces Staff College, Norfolk, Virginia (1958)
- Chesapeake Municipal Center, (Note: Bernard B. Spigel, architect; Lublin, McGaughy & Associates, associate architect. Originally intended as the Civic Center of Norfolk County which became the city of Chesapeake in 1963.) 306 Cedar Rd, Chesapeake, Virginia (1961, altered)
- Kirn Memorial Library, 301 E City Hall Ave, Norfolk, Virginia (1962, demolished 2009)
- Embassy of Germany, (Note: Egon Eiermann, architect; Lublin, McGaughy & Associates, associate architect.) 4645 Reservoir Rd NW, Washington, D.C. (1964)
- Algonquin House, 7320 Glenroie Ave, Norfolk, Virginia (1965)
- Webb University Center, Old Dominion University, Norfolk, Virginia (1966)
- BB&T Building, 500 E Main St, Norfolk, Virginia (1970)
- Master plan of Marj, Libya (1970)
- Ministry of Defense headquarters, Riyadh, Saudi Arabia (1976)
- Nebraska East Union, University of Nebraska–Lincoln East Campus, Lincoln, Nebraska (1977)
- Master plan of Brega, Libya (1980)
- Old Post Office rehabilitation, (Note: Arthur Cotton Moore/Associates, architect; McGaughy, Marshall & McMillan, associate architect.) 1100 Pennsylvania Ave NW, Washington, D.C. (1983)
- Master plan of Hamad Town, Bahrain (1984)
