= Metropolitan Partnership, Ltd. =

Real estate company in Washington, D.C.

- Type: Limited Partnership
- Industry: Real estate development
- Founded: 1984; 42 years ago
- Founder: Cary Euwer
- Headquarters: Baltimore, Maryland, United States
- Area served: Washington metropolitan area
- Website: metropolitanpartnership.com

Metropolitan Partnership, Ltd. is a company engaged in real estate development in the Washington metropolitan area. It is notable for its bid to redevelop the Old Post Office Pavilion into a 245-room Waldorf Astoria hotel in partnership with Hilton Worldwide. Among its completed projects are the redevelopment of the former headquarters of The Washington Star at 1101 Pennsylvania Avenue, Tysons International Plaza, and Fairfax Square, all designed by architects Skidmore, Owings and Merrill.

== History ==
In 1979, after completing graduate studies at Harvard University, Cary Euwer joined Cabot, Cabot & Forbes in Boston, Massachusetts, where he first worked on 60 State Street. He then set up the firm's Washington, D.C. office and developed 1201 Pennsylvania Avenue.

In 1983, he developed 250 West Pratt Street in Baltimore, Maryland with Skidmore, Owings and Merrill.

In 1984, Euwer founded Metropolitan.

By 1991, the firm had redeveloped the headquarters of The Washington Star at 1101 Pennsylvania Avenue, Tysons International Plaza, and Fairfax Square.

With the development of Fairfax Square, the firm forged relationships with several luxury retailers, including Tiffany & Co., Hermès, Louis Vuitton, Gucci and Fendi.

In 1998, the firm managed the retail re-positioning and construction of the ABC and Disney Studios at 1500 Broadway in Times Square, also with Skidmore, Owings and Merrill.

In 1999, the company partnered with Koll Development Company to develop office buildings for communications and technology firms in Northern Virginia.

In 2007, in partnership with Zaremba Group, the company developed Westchester Commons, a 900,000 square foot shopping mall in Richmond, Virginia.

In 2012, the company bid on a request for proposal from the General Services Administration to redevelop the Old Post Office Pavilion. The proposal submitted by the company included converting the building into a 245-room Waldorf Astoria hotel.

=== 10 Light Street ===
In 2012, the company acquired and began the redevelopment of 10 Light Street in Baltimore, Maryland into 419 apartments. In 2015, the company secured a lease with Under Armour for a 40,000sf Under Armour Performance Center. A penthouse unit at the property was listed for rent for $12,000 per month, the highest rents in Baltimore.

=== 1 Light Street ===
The company also redeveloped 1 Light Street, adjacent to its development at 10 Light Street, into office space after signing a 155,000sf lease with M&T Bank.

=== Former Alex Brown Building ===
In 2017, the company began redevelopment of the former Alex Brown building in Baltimore, Maryland into a 170-seat restaurant called the Alexander Brown Restaurant.
