= Kimpton Hotel Monaco Washington DC =

Hotel in Washington, D.C., United States

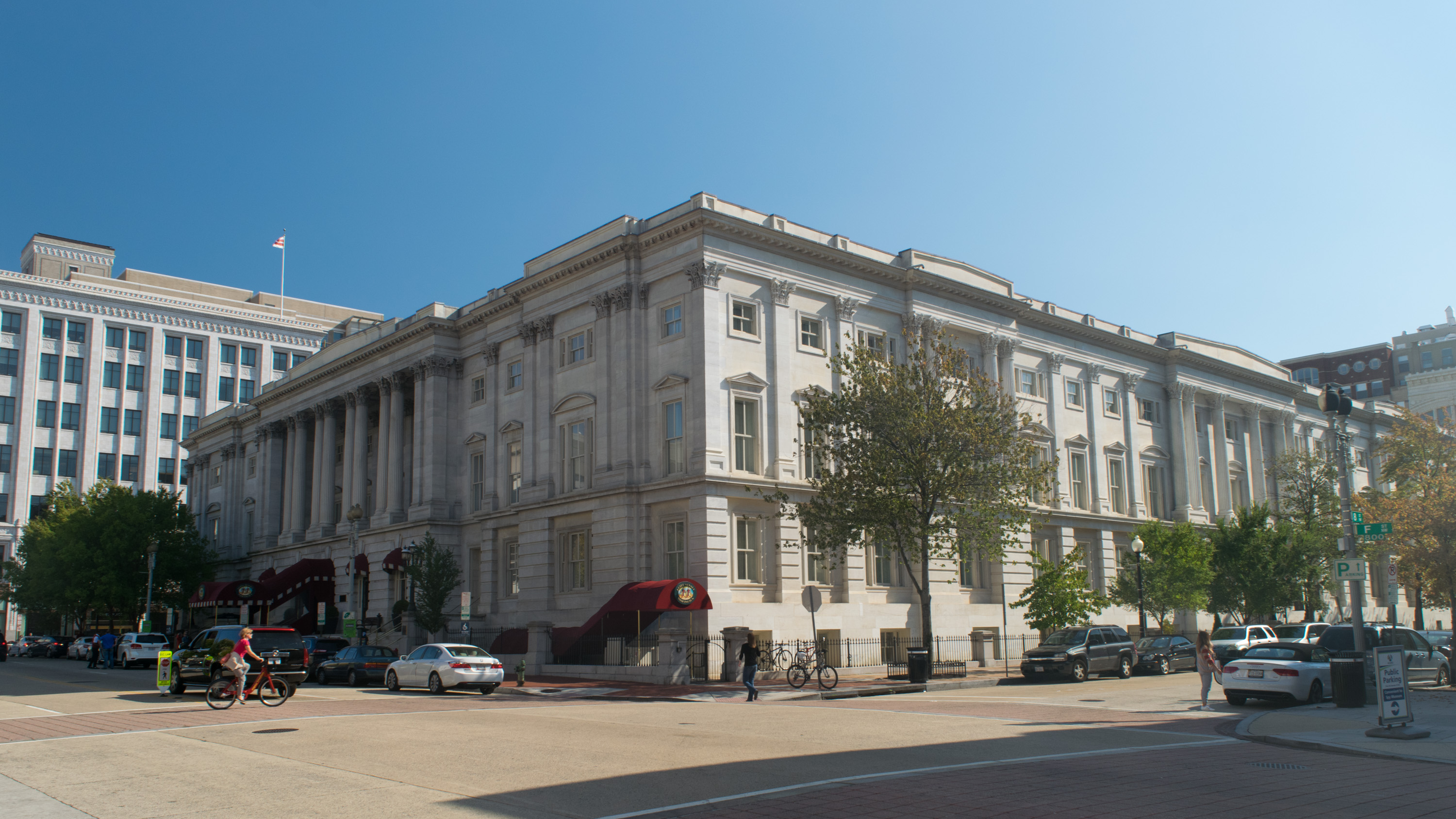
- Kimpton Hotel Monaco Washington DC in August 2008

- Location within Washington, D.C.

General information
- Location: Washington, D.C.
- Coordinates: 38°53′48.8″N 77°1′20.8″W
- Operator: Kimpton Hotels & Restaurants

Design and construction
- Architects: Robert Mills and Thomas U. Walter

Other information
- Number of rooms: 183
- Number of restaurants: 1

Website
- https://www.monaco-dc.com

Kimpton Hotel Monaco Washington DC is a 183-room high end boutique hotel at the corner of 7th and F Streets Northwest in the Penn Quarter neighborhood of Washington, D.C. Kimpton Hotel Monaco DC is one of ten Kimpton hotel properties in the Washington Metropolitan Area and is located across the street from the National Portrait Gallery and the Capital One Arena. The hotel opened in the summer of 2002 and was named one of the eighty best new hotels in the world in 2003 by Condé Nast Traveler. In September 2010, Pebblebrook Hotel Trust acquired the Monaco Washington DC hotel for $74.0 million.

== Architecture ==
Kimpton Hotel Monaco DC is located inside the neoclassical General Post Office building, a National Historic Landmark constructed in 1839 that was the first all-marble building in Washington and patterned after the Roman Temple of Jupiter. The hotel, listed on the Historic Hotels of America, occupies an entire city block between 7th and 8th, and E and F streets. The four-story building is separated by a courtyard. One half of the structure was designed by Robert Mills, designer of the Washington Monument, while the other half was designed by Thomas U. Walter, one of the architects for the United States Capitol.

Kimpton began a $32 million renovation of the General Post Office Building in 2000 after an agreement with the General Services Administration to lease the building for 60 years. The main post office area was transformed into the hotel lobby and the mail-sorting pavilion became the restaurant.

== Room design ==
The hotel rooms feature vaulted 12–18 ft (3.7-5.5 m) ceilings and long windows. The color scheme of each room is eclectic. The drapes are charcoal and white patterned, the walls are yellow, lounge chairs are periwinkle blue, chandeliers are lime green, and damask pillows are a mixture of orange and red. A bust of Thomas Jefferson, the third President of the United States and a good friend of Robert Mills, sits on top of a neoclassic armoire in each room. In addition to standard rooms and suites, the hotel features "Tall Rooms" with 18-foot ceilings, 96-inch (244 cm) beds, and raised showerheads. First floor rooms are mostly below ground with only small windows near the ceiling letting in sunlight. The second through fourth floor exterior rooms face the city, while the interior rooms face the courtyard and restaurant. Each guest is given a complimentary goldfish at check-in which hotel staff feed and maintain during the guest's stay.

== Restaurant ==
Hotel Monaco's restaurant and bar, Dirty Habit, features a glass-walled atrium and a large outdoor patio. It shares its name and design with a hotel restaurant in San Francisco. The restaurant is accessible through an entrance in the hotel lobby and a second entrance on 8th Street that was once a carriageway passage for horses and buggies.

When the hotel opened in 2002, the original restaurant was Poste Moderne Brasserie, which closed in 2016. Poste was known for its sustainable practices and organic garden, and it was the 2009 Mayor's Environmental Excellence Award Winner for Outstanding Achievement by a Restaurant. In 2008, Poste was recognized as the Upscale Casual Restaurant of the Year by the Restaurant Association of Metropolitan Washington. In 2014, First Lady Michelle Obama celebrated her 50th birthday in a private room at Poste.

== Gallery ==
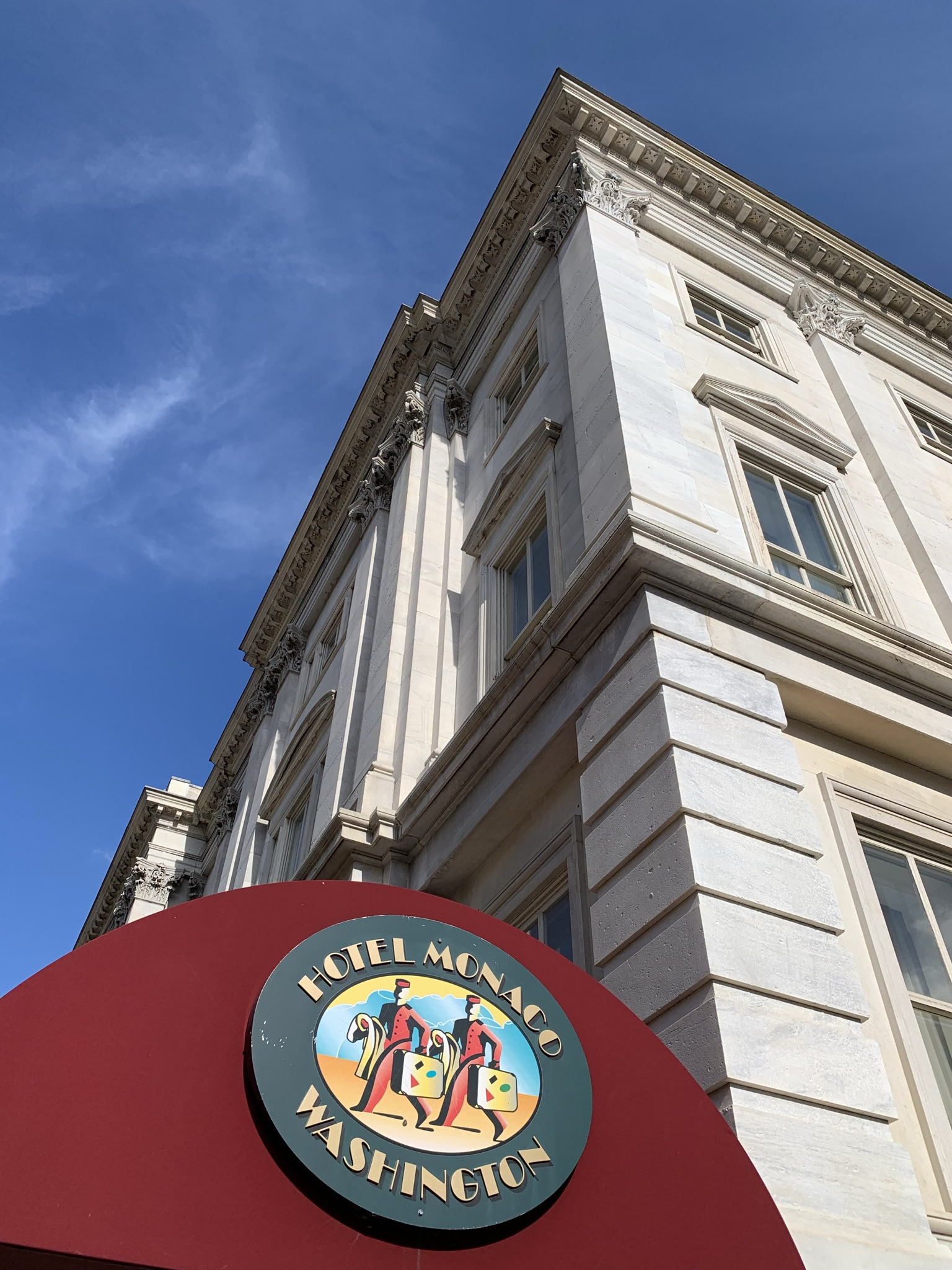
Hotel sign

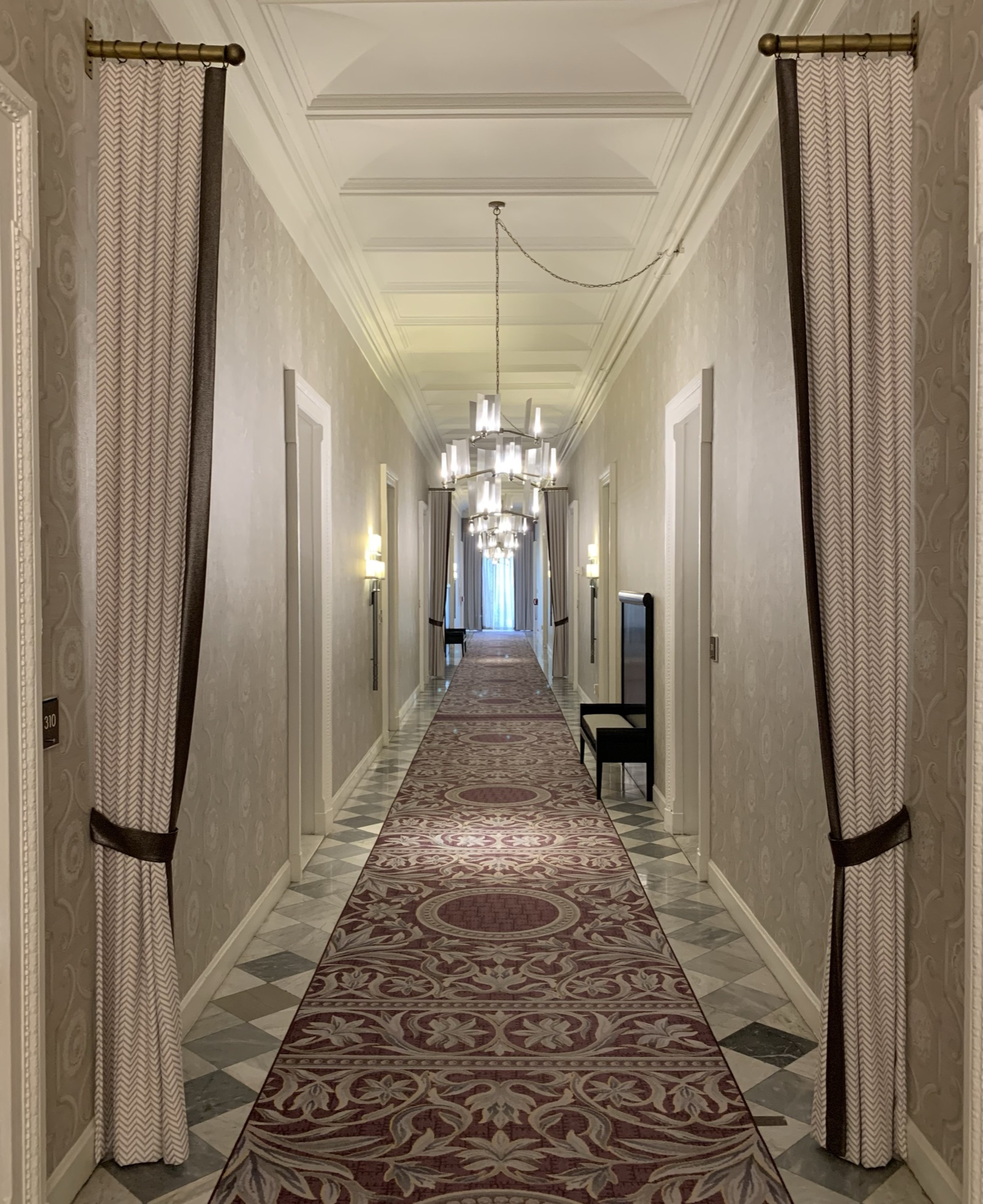
Hotel hallway

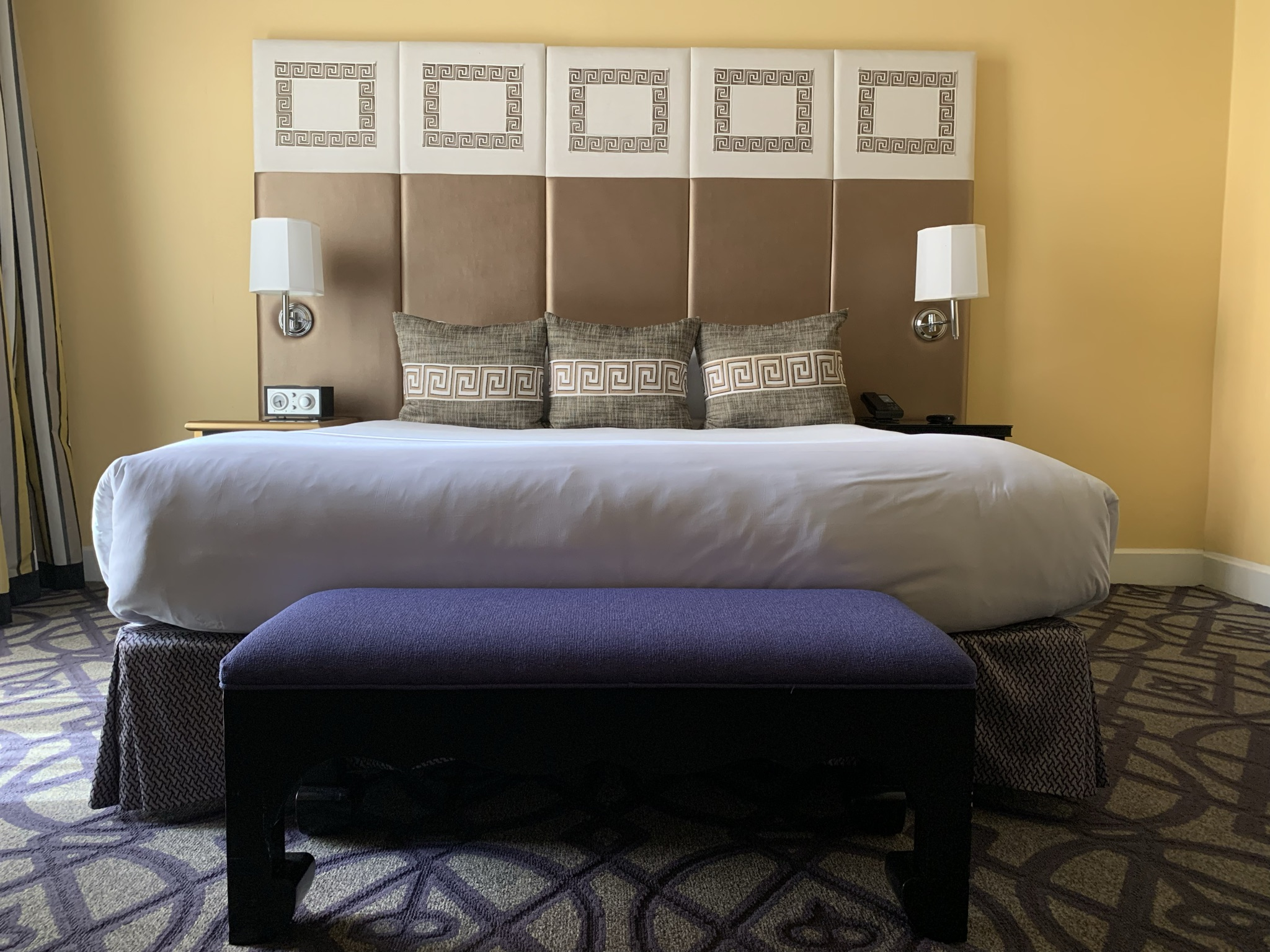
Hotel bed

Hotel ballroom
