= General Post Office (Washington, D.C.) =

- U.S. National Register of Historic Places
- U.S. National Historic Landmark
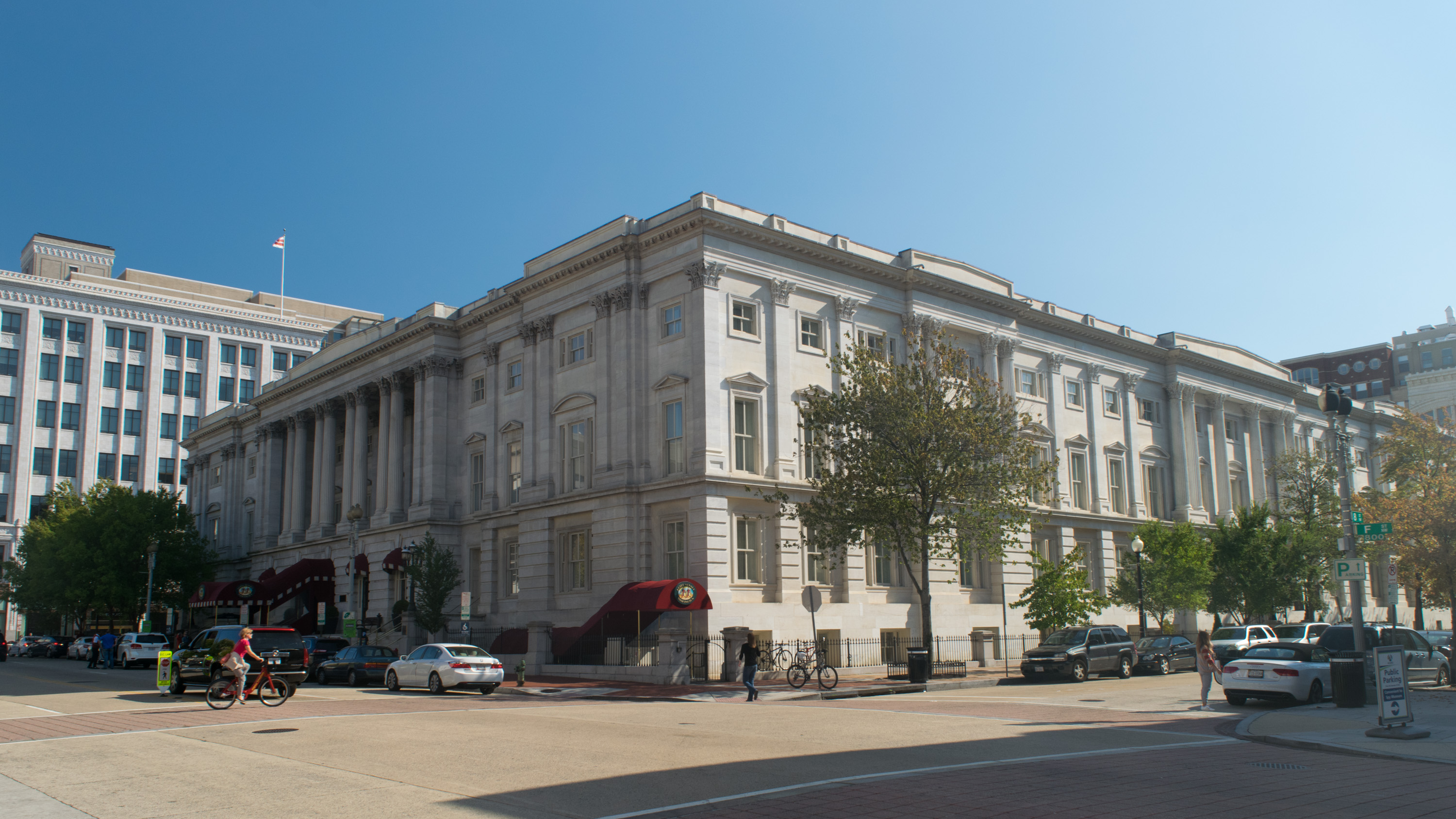
- General Post Office in 2016

- Location within Central Washington, D.C. Location within the District of Columbia Location within the United States
- Location: 700 F Street NW, Washington, D.C., US
- Coordinates: 38°53′48.8″N 77°1′20.8″W
- Built: 1839
- Architect: Robert Mills (architect) & Thomas U. Walter
- Architectural style: Greek Revival
- NRHP reference No.: 69000311

Significant dates
- Added to NRHP: March 24, 1969
- Designated NHL: November 11, 1971

The General Post Office, also known as the Tariff Commission Building, is a historic building at 700 F Street NW in Washington, D.C., United States. Built in 1839 to a design by Robert Mills and enlarged in 1866 to a design by Thomas U. Walter, it is an example of Greek Revival architecture. It was designated a US National Historic Landmark in 1971 for its architecture. The building has housed the Hotel Monaco since 2002.

== Description ==
The former General Post Office building occupies an entire city block in central Washington, bounded by 7th and 8th Streets NW, and E and F Streets NW. Built in two major stages, it is composed of two U-shaped structures surrounding a central courtyard. The southern section, mainly facing E Street, is a marble structure three stories in height, set on a raised basement. Its main facade is nineteen bays wide, with the entrance recessed in an enlarged bay at the center. Bays are articulated by banded piers on the first floor and Corinthian pilasters above. Windows on the second floor are topped by peaked lintels. The northern section has a more elaborate facade fronting F Street, which serves as the main hotel entrance. At its center is a five-bay entrance pavilion, with an arcaded recess above the entrances framed by Corinthian pillars and pilasters. The building's public interior spaces on the south side exhibit characteristics of Robert Mills' design, including barrel-vaulted passageways.

== History ==
The site was originally developed by Samuel Blodgett, Jr. (son of Samuel Blodgett), who enlisted James Hoban to design a hotel, which was the largest privately owned structure in Washington when completed in the early 1800s. The federal government purchased Blodgett's hotel in 1810, to house the US Post Office Department and US Patent Office. During the War of 1812, Superintendent of the Patent Office William Thornton convinced British troops to spare the building when they burned down the District. Following the destruction of the United States Capitol, members of Congress convened in Blodgett's hotel from September 1814 to December 1815.

A fireplace accident set the building on fire in 1836, destroying thousands of patent models and records. President Andrew Jackson sought to rebuild the General Post Office, and Robert Mills designed and oversaw construction, with the new General Post Office completed in 1842. The original building was a U-shape, extending along E Street and part way up 7th and 8th Streets. In 1845, Samuel Morse opened the first public telegraph office in the General Post Office.

Thomas U. Walter oversaw the building's expansion from 1855 to 1866, when the building was extended and connected along F Street to form a complete rectangle. This expansion was interrupted by the Civil War, when Union soldiers used the basement as munitions storage. The US Post Office Department moved out in 1897. The United States General Land Office was a tenant from 1897 to 1917. The US National Selective Service Board was a tenant in 1919, and it was here that US Army General John J. Pershing wrote his report on the American Expeditionary Forces in World War I. The US Tariff Commission was a tenant from 1932 to 1988, eventually occupying the entire building.

The building was vacant from 1988 to 2002, when Michael Stanton Architecture in partnership with the Kimpton Group was selected by the US General Services Administration (GSA) to convert the building into a 184-room hotel, which became the Kimpton Hotel Monaco Washington DC. The Washington Monaco Hotel was honored with the Washington DC Mayor's Award for Historic Preservation, as well as the GSA Heritage Award for Adaptive Use and the GSA Heritage Award for Conservation and Restoration.

== See also ==
- List of United States post offices
- List of National Historic Landmarks in Washington, D.C.
- National Register of Historic Places listings in central Washington, D.C.
