= Adelbert Fischer House =

Coordinates: 40.042153°N 75.201573°W

General information
- Architectural style: Art Nouveau
- Town or city: Philadelphia
- Country: United States

The Adelbert Fischer House is a home in Philadelphia designed by architect Milton Bennett Medary. It was built in 1909. It is one of only several Art Nouveau buildings in Philadelphia. It inspired later works by Robert Venturi and Denise Scott.
