= Federal Triangle =

Collection of buildings in Washington, D.C.

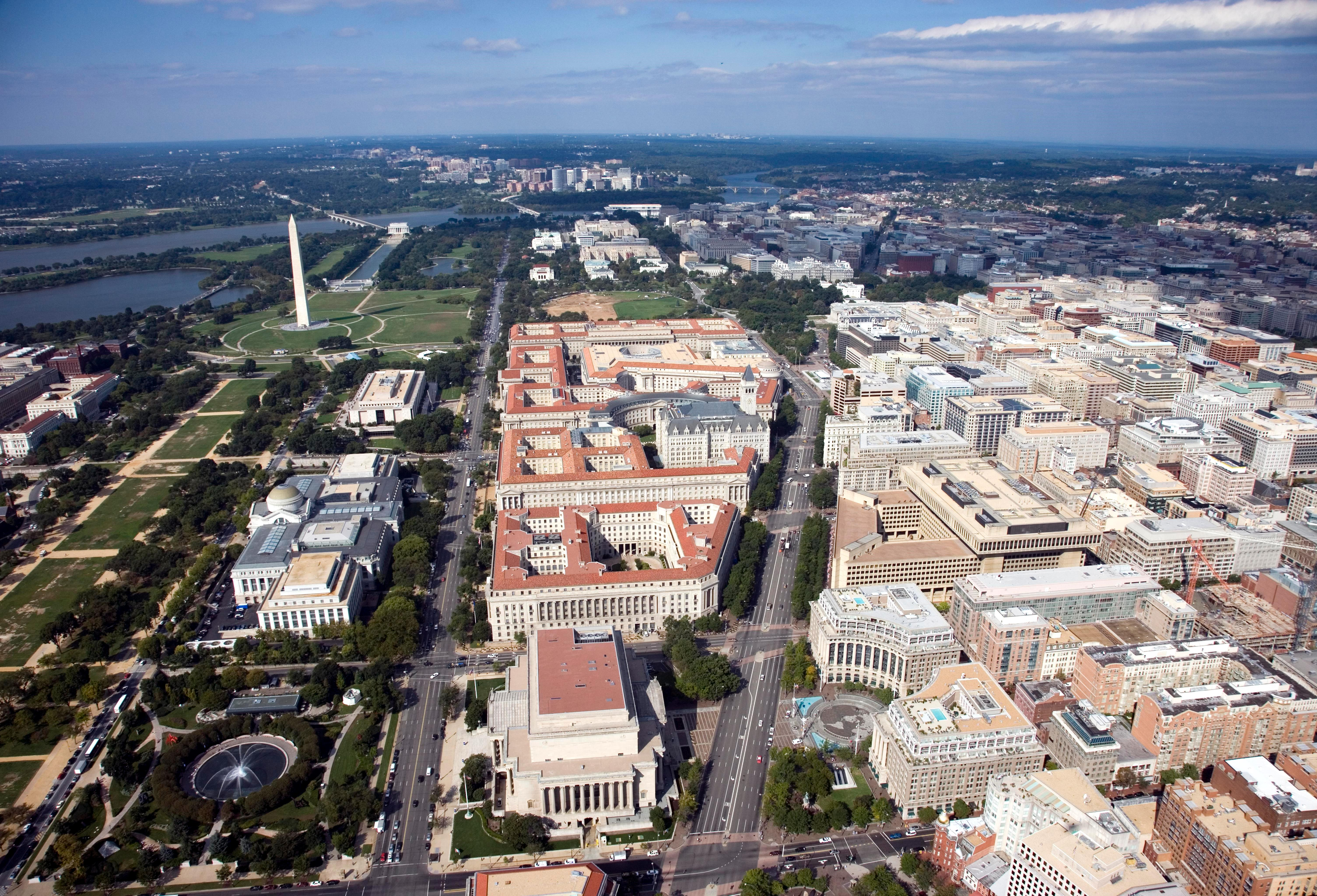
- An aerial view of Federal Triangle (center), the National Mall (on left), and Downtown Washington, D.C. (on right) in September 2006

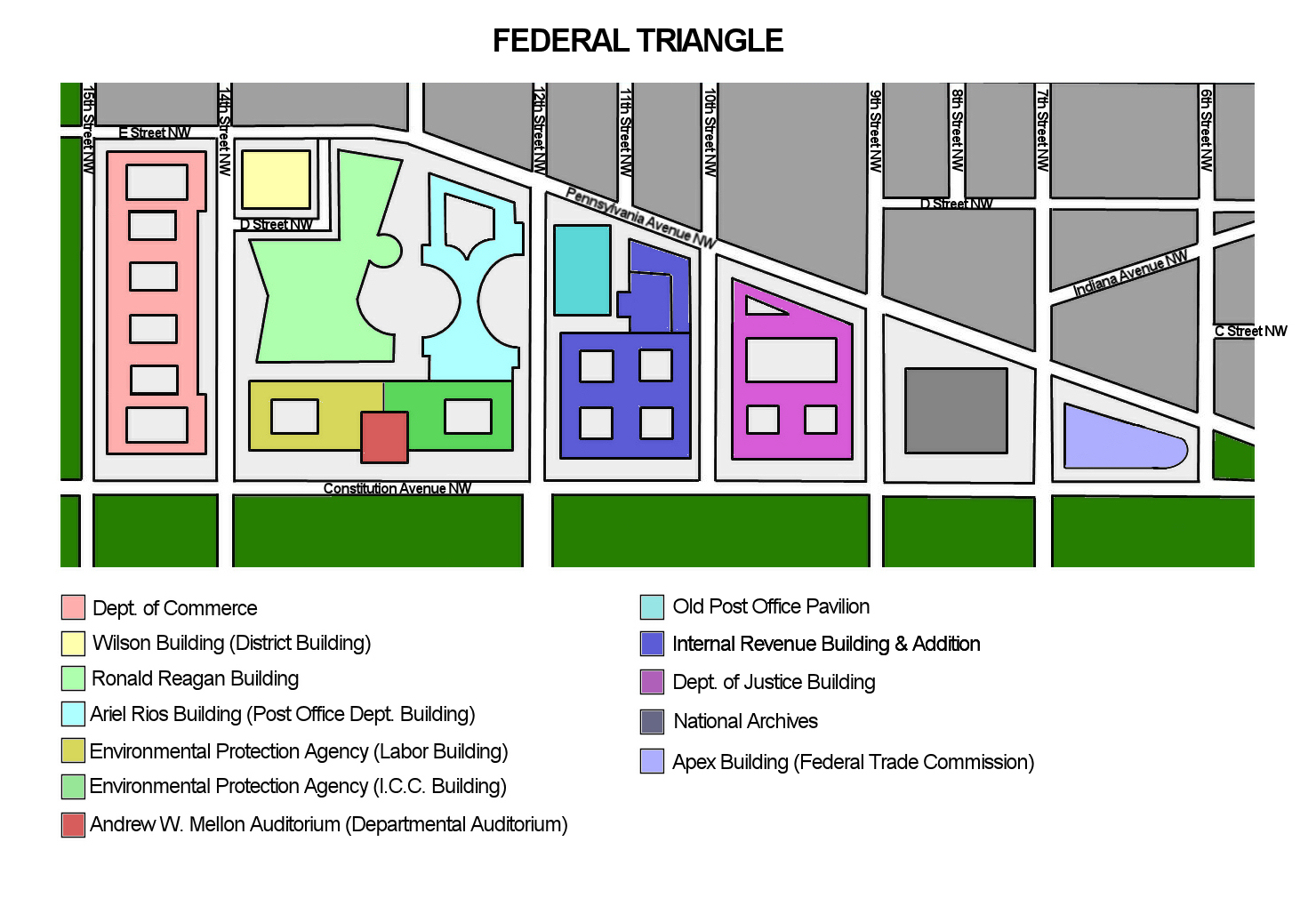
- A diagram of Federal Triangle as of 2009, showing all 10 key buildings in the complex
- Location: Washington, D.C., U.S.
- Coordinates: 38°53′34.8″N 77°01′48″W

Federal Triangle is a triangular area in Washington, D.C., formed by 15th Street NW, Constitution Avenue NW, Pennsylvania Avenue NW, and E Street NW. Federal Triangle is occupied by ten large city and federal office buildings, all of which are part of the Pennsylvania Avenue National Historic Site.

Seven of the buildings in Federal Triangle were built by the U.S. federal government in the early and mid-1930s as part of a coordinated construction plan that has been called "one of the greatest building projects ever undertaken". Two buildings predating this coordinated effort were incorporated into Federal Triangle. One building was built in the 1990s.

Federal Triangle station is the Washington Metro station serving Federal Triangle and its immediately surrounding areas.

== Name ==
The name "Federal Triangle" appears to have been a journalistic invention. The press wrote of a "Pennsylvania Avenue Triangle" as early as November 18, 1926, and use of this name continued as late as June 1929. By 1927, it was more common for the news media to refer to the area as "the Triangle". This name was in use by 1928, even by government officials, and still used as of late 1934.

In 1935, the Associated Press first used the term "Federal Triangle", with both words capitalized. The New York Times first used the term in 1936, although the paper's capitalization of both words did not become standardized until 1939. Definitions of the area varied at first. Early news reports believed the eastern apex of Federal Triangle extended as far east and south as the Ulysses S. Grant Memorial in front of the United States Capitol. But almost all reports referred to Pennsylvania Avenue NW and 15th Street NW as the Triangle's northern and western boundaries.

== Genesis and design ==
=== Plan ===
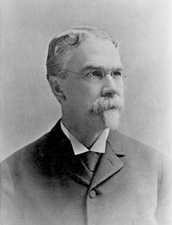
U.S. Senator James McMillan, who led the commission that authored the McMillan Plan, published in 1902, which provided guidance for the development of Washington, D.C.

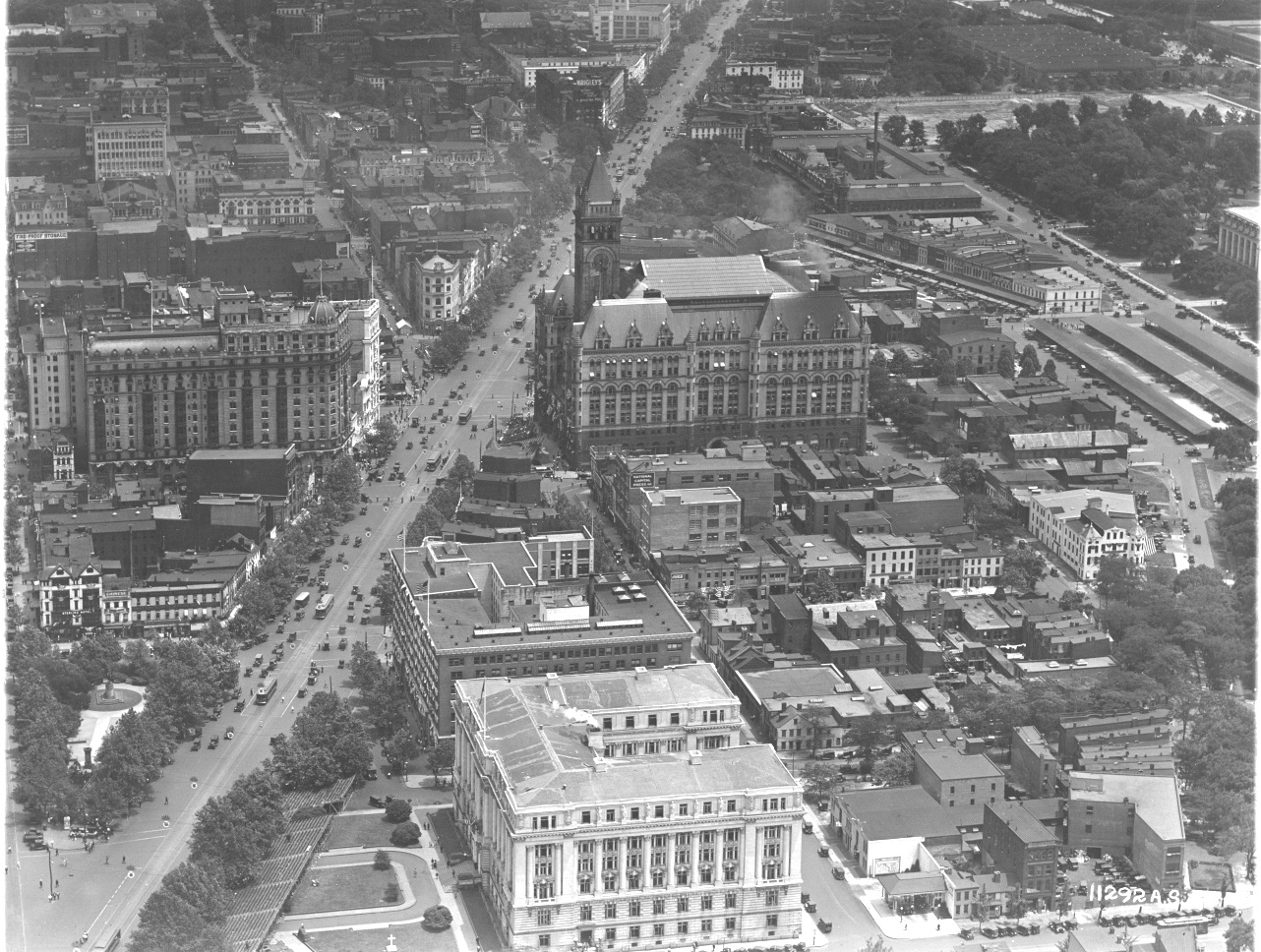
A 1923 photograph of Federal Triangle, including Pennsylvania Avenue (on left), the District Building (in foreground), the Post Office building, and Center Market (in background)

The Senate Park Commission, also known as the McMillan Commission, was formed by the United States Congress in 1900 to reconcile competing visions for the development of Washington, D.C., and especially the National Mall and nearby areas. The commission's plan for development, the McMillan Plan, proposed to replace the residences and other buildings on Lafayette Square with tall, Neoclassical office buildings with facades of white marble for executive branch offices. Demolition proceeded on some nearby buildings: notably, the Hay-Adams Houses, Corcoran House, and a portion of the Decatur House grounds. But the rapid expansion in the size and number of executive-branch agencies in the 1910s, 1920s, and 1930s made the McMillan Plan's development of Lafayette Square impractical, and Congressional and local support for the project waned.

Over the next few years, the president and Congress established several agencies to supervise the approval, design, and construction of new buildings in the District of Columbia: The Commission of Fine Arts in 1910 to approve designs, the Public Buildings Commission in 1916 to make recommendations about the housing of federal agencies and offices, and the National Capital Parks and Planning Commission in 1924 to oversee planning. In the mid-1910s, Congress appropriated and the government spent $7 million to acquire land on Pennsylvania Avenue NW between 14th and 15th Streets NW and several blocks south.

No demolition or construction took place during that period, and the government merely collected rent from the tenants in the area. In 1924, the Public Buildings Commission recommended that a new series of federal office buildings be built near the White House. The plan called for a complex of buildings to be built at Murder Bay, a muddy, flood-prone, malaria-ridden, poverty-stricken region lacking in paved roads, sewer system, and running water and almost exclusively home to numerous brothels and an extensive criminal underclass.

=== 1926 ===
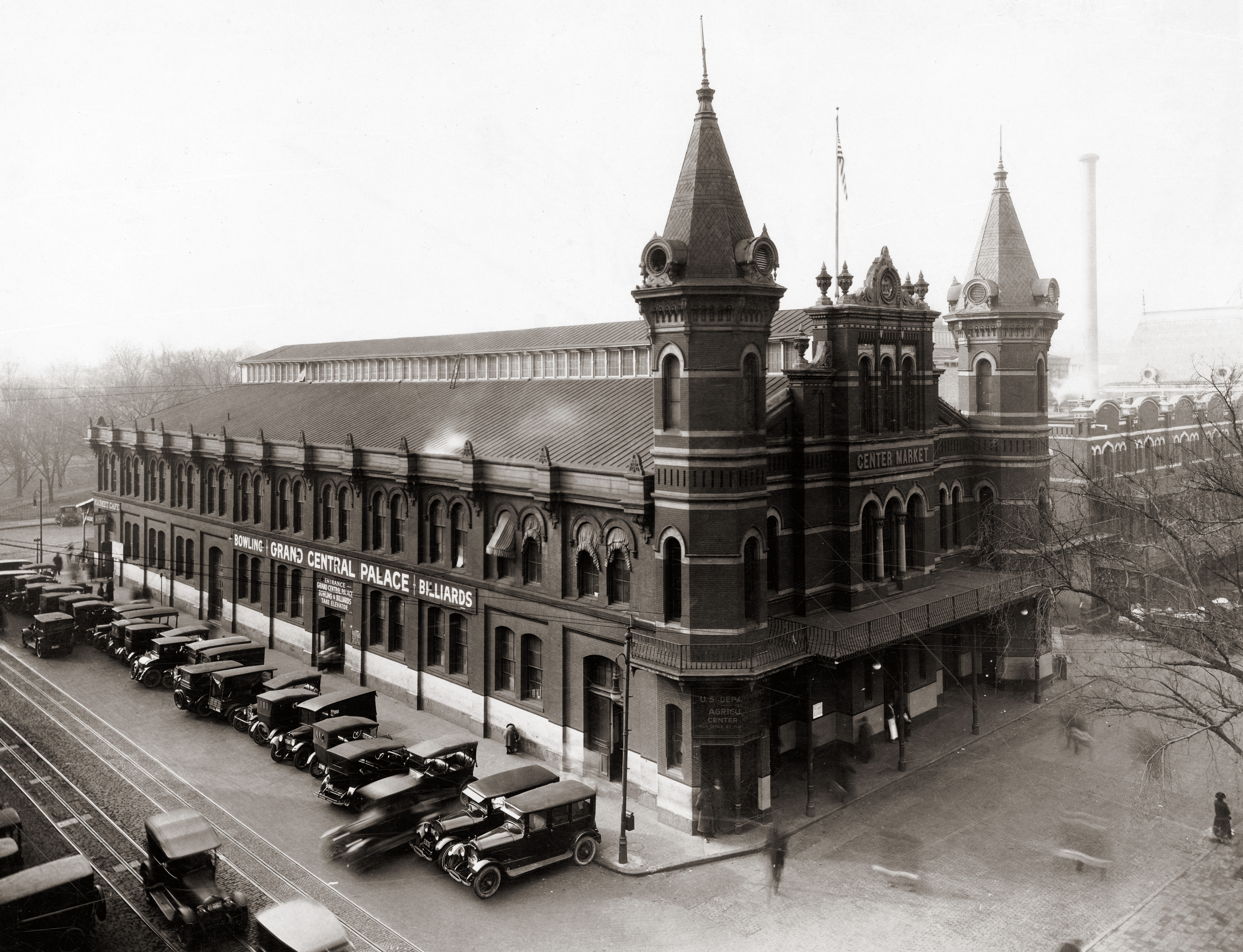
Center Market in the 1920s

Federal Triangle, as the area would be renamed, had its genesis in 1926. An attempt to provide $50 million to fund, among other things, a national archives building and develop federal offices along Pennsylvania Avenue NW was proposed in 1925. The effort saw success in 1926 with the passage by the United States Congress of the Public Buildings Act, which authorized the construction not only of the Federal Triangle complex of buildings but also a new U.S. Supreme Court building opposite the United States Capitol, a major extension of the U.S. Government Printing Office building on North Capitol Street, and significant widening of B Street NW on the north side of the National Mall, eventually renamed Constitution Avenue.

Appropriations were to be made annually, leaving control of the project firmly in Congressional hands. Congress appropriated $50 million, including $10 million annually for five years, for construction of these projects in 1927, with half the funds to be spent solely on Federal Triangle. A second appropriation bill provided $25 million for buying up all additional privately held land in Federal Triangle. On June 5, 1926, the Treasury Department, which had been given authority over the implementation of the building program, announced the Federal Triangle projects (among others) which would move forward and their anticipated cost:

- A National Archives building, with total cost of land and construction to be $6.9 million, including $1 million appropriated in fiscal 1927.
- A new Internal Revenue Bureau building, with total cost of land and construction to be $7.95 million, including $1.7 million appropriated in fiscal 1927.
- A new Department of Commerce building, with total cost of construction to be $10 million, including $600,000 appropriated in fiscal 1927.

Treasury officials said the Archives building was their top priority, followed by the Internal Revenue building, two Department of Agriculture projects, and the Commerce building last. At that time, no provision was made to construct a new building for the Department of Justice and no sites were named for construction of the three announced buildings. Preliminary plans for the Commerce building were presented to the Commission on Fine Arts and Public Building Commission in mid-June. On July 7, the Treasury Department and Commission of Fine Arts announced sites and sizes for the three previously announced structures. The Department of Commerce building would contain 1 million square feet (93,000 square metres) of office space and be sited on the south side of B Street NW (now Constitution Avenue NW) on the National Mall.

The Internal Revenue building would contain 650,000 square feet (60,450 square metres) of office space and take up two whole city blocks between 10th and 12th Streets NW and B and C Streets NW (cutting off 11th Street NW). The National Archives would contain 2.3 million square feet (213,900 square metres) of office space, and take up one city block between 12th and 13th Streets NW and B and C Streets NW (cutting off the last block of Ohio Avenue NW). The government owned three of the four plots needed for the Internal Revenue site, but none of the land beneath the proposed Archives building.

Purchasing both sites, officials estimated, would cost $700,000 each. Treasury officials also proposed at this time adding a Justice building on Pennsylvania Avenue between 14th and 15th Streets NW, and a Labor building (facing 15th Street) between 14th and 15th Streets NW and D Street NW and Ohio Avenue NW. Preliminary plans for these buildings were expected to be presented in three months.

The purchase of land delayed the construction program considerably over the next several years. Center Market, designed by architect Adolf Cluss and built in 1872, was the largest of the District of Columbia's markets, serving tens of thousands of people a day at a time when general stores and greengrocers were uncommon in the city. It was also a hub for transportation in the District of Columbia, as the city's trolley lines converged there. At the time it was built, it was the largest food market in the United States—with space for more than a thousand vendors, the city's first cold-storage vaults, its own ice storage facility, and its own artesian well.

Center Market occupied two blocks between 7th and 9th Streets NW on the north side of B Street NW. As early as August 1926, planners recognized that relocating Center Market and purchasing land from owners eagerly seeking inflated prices from the federal government would delay the Federal Triangle project significantly. Early negotiations with private landowners in the area collapsed early on when owners demanded exorbitant prices for their properties, and the city and federal government began condemnation proceedings in late August 1926 against owners on B Street NW between 10th and 13th Streets. Federal legislation authorizing expanded, faster condemnation powers for the Federal Triangle areas was sought in November 1926, and passed a month later.

In January 1927, condemnation (under the old eminent domain law) of the final block necessary for the Internal Revenue building began. The Commission of Fine Arts placed a ban on all non-federal construction in the area in February 1927. The relocation of Center Market began in July 1927. The final lot for the Internal Revenue site was not condemned and purchased until October 1927. Negotiations for the privately owned land at the Archives site began in late November 1927. Funds were furnished in February 1928 to buy the Southern Railway building at the southwest corner of 13th Street NW and Pennsvylania Avenue NW, which already housed a number of federal agencies (it was purchased in 1929).

After six months, D.C. city officials began to consider a new location for Center Market. The new 1926 federal condemnation law was first used in October 1929 to condemn a set of parcels on the south side of D Street NW between 13th and 13½ Streets NW. A second set of parcels (Pennsylvania Avenue NW and B, 12th, and 13th Streets NW) was condemned under the new law in December 1930. The first land for the National Archives (later the Justice Department) building site was not acquired until July 1930 even though the site had been selected for development in November 1926. Center Market was not relocated until early 1931, more than four years after the process began. Additional land for the Justice and Post Office buildings was condemned in March and December 1931.

Another major effort had to be made to condemn and remove railroad tracks from Federal Triangle, which had converged on the Center Market site. Although the Treasury Department had ordered the tracks lifted by April 1, 1931, this effort did not begin in earnest until early 1931. Negotiations over the price of the land and equipment broke down in February 1931, and the tracks had still not been removed by January 1932. Delay occurred in obtaining the Post Office land as well. Several parcels of land were not condemned until July 1, 1931—a single day before demolition on adjacent parcels of land began. The land for the Apex Building site was finally obtained through condemnation in July 1931.

The initial Federal Triangle building plan was significantly revised by the Public Buildings Commission in November 1926. President Calvin Coolidge refused in September to permit the Commerce building to be placed on the Mall. A few weeks later, the Commission of Fine Arts decided that the Commerce building should be relocated to 14th and 15th Streets NW, extending from D Street NW to B Street NW (cutting off Ohio Avenue NW and C Street NW). The National Capital Parks and Planning Commission established a committee, composed of William Adams Delano, Milton Bennett Medary, and Frederick Law Olmsted Jr., to study the street plan in the Federal Triangle area and recommend appropriate closures or alterations, if any.

While the Public Buildings Commission studied the Commerce site, and even considered halving the size of the building so that two structures could be built along 15th Street, plans for the Archives building were approved and a contract signed for razing of the Internal Revenue site. After these deliberations, the Public Buildings Commission announced on November 17, 1926, that several new buildings would be added and new sites for proposed buildings announced, including:

- A new Department of Justice building, to be located between Pennsylvania Avenue NW and D Street NW, and 14th and 15th Streets NW.
- A new "General Supply" building, to be located between 14th and 13th Streets NW between D and C Streets NW.
- A new Independent Offices building, to be located between 12th and 13th Streets NW and B and C Streets NW (cutting off the last block of Ohio Avenue NW; this was the original proposed site of the National Archives in June 1926).
- A new Department of Labor building, to be located between 13th and 14th Streets NW and B and C Streets NW.
- A new General Accounting Office building, to be located between 9th and 10th Streets NW and B and C Streets NW.
- Moving the Department of Commerce site from the National Mall to between 14th and 15th Streets NW between C and B Streets NW.
- Moving the National Archives site northward to between 12th and 13th Streets NW and Pennsylvania Avenue NW and C Streets NW (cutting off D Street NW).
- Retaining the previously announced site of the Internal Revenue building.

The Public Buildings Commission also announced it would build an 1,800-car parking lot next to the Department of Commerce building, and would proceed with construction of the Commerce and Archives first, as they were the top priority. Three months later, the estimates for construction of the Commerce building was increased to $16 million from $10 million and for the Internal Revenue building to $10.5 million from $2.5 million. Work on the Commerce building site was expected to begin by March 31, 1927. Government officials, other experts, and the press believed that the demolition of the District Building and Old Post Office Pavilion and the closure of many streets in the area would occur.

=== 1927 ===
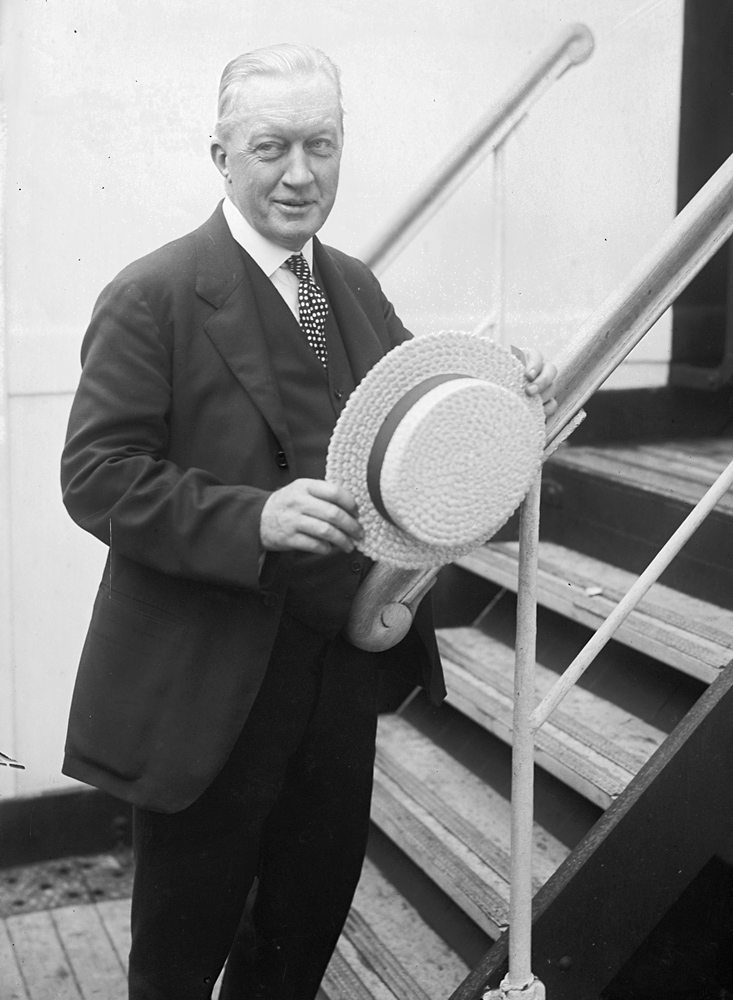
John Russell Pope, one of the key architects of Federal Triangle

Work on all buildings was postponed in May 1927. On May 6, an ad hoc committee composed of Olmsted; Medary; Charles Moore, chair of the Commission on Fine Arts; and Louis E. Simon, Supervising Architect of the U.S. Treasury, recommended relocating the Justice building from 15th Street NW to a lot further east so that traffic congestion at 15th and Pennsylvania might be alleviated. This ad hoc committee met again three days later to not only consider the Justice building relocation but also to consider a plan to create a single building ringing Federal Triangle rather than six to eight individual structures.

The Public Buildings Commission considered the same plan on May 16. The Commission on Fine Arts approved relocating the Justice building the following day. Disagreements among the three planning bodies proved so fundamental that a new Board of Architectural Consultants was created on May 19, 1927, to advise the groups on the development of Federal Triangle. The Board consisted of the Supervising Architect of the U.S. Treasury (Louis E. Simon) and six private architects, including Louis Ayres, Edward H. Bennett, Arthur Brown Jr., William Adams Delano, Milton Bennett Medary, and John Russell Pope.

The Board of Architectural Consultants first met on May 23, at which time it considered a plan to create a single building ringing Federal Triangle rather than six to eight individual structures. As the Board of Architectural Consultants began its deliberations, the Commission on Fine Arts approved a plan to locate the Justice building on the north side of B Street NW between 7th and 9th Streets NW (where Center Market stood).

About two weeks later, the Public Buildings Commission approved the single structure plan. This plan envisioned a central plaza, defined by 13th, 14th, B, and D Streets NW, surrounded by a traffic circle, with the buildings lining the exterior of the traffic circle. Few streets would be closed. Rather, arches would connect each building to its neighbors, with only 12th Street NW remaining unbridged.

In June 1927, the final design of Federal Triangle began to come together. The Board of Architectural Consultants approved the construction of the Commerce and Internal Revenue structures as stand-alone buildings on the sites last proposed in late June. In July, the Board proposed eight buildings, sited as follows:

- Archives (surrounded by Interstate Commerce on the north, east, and south)
- Commerce (west side of 15th Street NW between B and D Streets NW)
- General Accounting (13th, 14th, B, and C Streets NW)
- Independent Offices (6th, 7th, and B Streets NW and Pennsylvania Avenue NW)
- Internal Revenue (B, 10th, 12th, and C Streets NW)
- Interstate Commerce (9th, 10th, and B Streets NW and Pennsylvania Avenue NW)
- Justice (7th, 9th, and B Streets NW and Pennsylvania Avenue NW)
- Labor (B, 13th, 14th, and C Streets NW)

The Board did not address the future of the District Building, Old Post Office Pavilion, or Southern Railway Building, but had tentatively agreed to continue with the "Louvre plan" of a ring of buildings joined by arches.

The first design contract for any of the buildings in Federal Triangle was statutorily required by Congress in 1926 as part of the Public Buildings Act. A new headquarters for the Department of Commerce had been proposed in 1912 and a contract for the design work awarded to the architectural firm of York and Sawyer. Although this building was never built, Congress honored the contract and named the firm again as the Commerce building's designer.

By March 1927, government officials had already decided that the Commerce building should be 1,000 feet (305 metres) long—making it the then-largest building in the District of Columbia. The May 1927 work moratorium put these plans on hold. In September 1927, the design of the Internal Revenue building was handed over to Louis Simon at the Treasury Department, and the Commission of Fine Arts met to discuss proposed plans for both the Commerce and Internal Revenue buildings. At the same time, the commission received bids on demolition of existing structures in the Triangle.

After review by the Board of Architectural Consultants, the Public Buildings Commission gave final design approval on November 1, 1927, to the Commerce and Internal Revenue buildings. The previous sizes of both buildings was reaffirmed, as was the "Louvre plan" for a unified ring of buildings surrounding a traffic circle and plaza. The Commission on Fine Arts adopted a requirement that the planned Federal Triangle buildings have a "uniform appearance" and height (six stories), limiting the Board's deliberations. Secretary Mellon imposed a requirement that all the buildings be built in the Neoclassical architectural style. By mid-December 1927, the design of the Archives building had been approved, and the Board of Architectural Consultants was meeting again to study once more the general layout of Federal Triangle.

=== 1928 ===
By March 1928, newspapers had reported that the Commerce and Internal Revenue buildings would be constructed first, followed by the Archives, then Justice, and then a newly added Post Office building. Plans continued for the demolition of the District Building and Southern Railway headquarters (although the latter would be the last to be razed, as it would be used as temporary office space for displaced federal workers). Although the Commerce building plans (a 1,051-foot-long [320 m] building with 1,000,000 square feet [93,000 m^{2}] of office space, the largest office building in the world) had stabilized by March 1928, some designers suggested that both 15th and 14th Streets NW be submerged in tunnels beneath the structure.

About the same time, the Internal Revenue building's square footage was reduced by almost a quarter to 500,000 square feet (46,500 square metres). In July, Congress appropriated $210,000 for design work for the Independent Offices, Interstate Commerce, Justice, and Labor buildings, and Secretary Mellon altered the work schedule yet again to focus on these structures. The Board of Architectural Consultants met to consider ways in which the construction program might be sped up, and devised plans to have four approved buildings (Commerce, Internal Revenue, Justice and Labor) completed by 1932. By October 1928, the Board of Architectural Consultants had agreed with prior decisions that no office building should be constructed on the National Mall, and that this space should be reserved for museums.

Plans for the eastern apex of Federal Triangle were complicated by an ongoing effort to create a George Washington Memorial. A George Washington Memorial Association was organized in 1898 to establish in the District of Columbia a university bearing Washington's name. Efforts to do so were unsuccessful, but in 1904 the Association signed an agreement with D.C.-based Columbian University to change its name to George Washington University and build a large memorial hall on the university's campus. Plans for the memorial hall did not move forward, so the Association joined with the Smithsonian Institution to build a similar structure on the former site of the Baltimore and Potomac Railroad's Pennsylvania Station.

In 1914, a design competition was held, and architects chosen. In 1921, the cornerstone was laid, and some of the foundation and a marble stairway built on a plot of land across B Street NW (where the National Gallery of Art sits today) in 1924. In 1929, even as the Federal Triangle project was moving forward, the George Washington Memorial Association was conducting fund-raising for the construction of the building at the proposed National Archives site. Press reports indicate that the building had already been displaced from the Apex building site. The fund-raising effort eventually failed, and the foundation and stairs were razed in 1937 to make way for the National Gallery of Art.

=== 1929–1931 ===
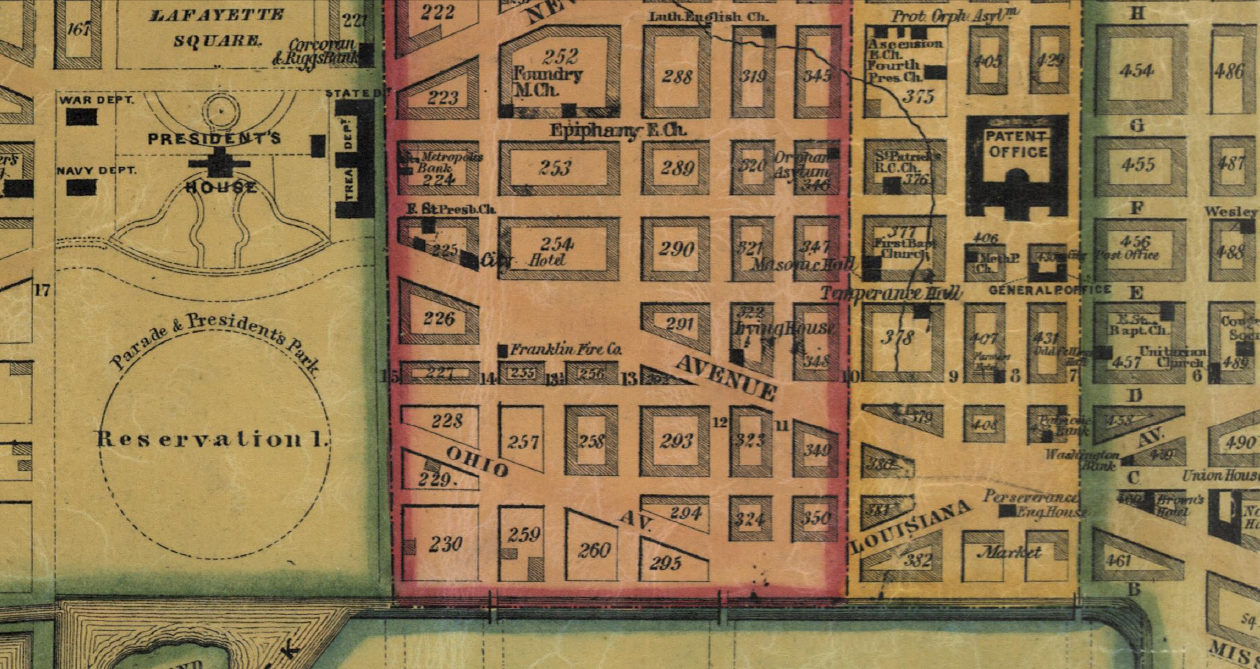
A map of Washington, D.C., published in 1851 but still extant as of 1926, showing the area around Federal Triangle as originally planned and built in accordance with the L'Enfant Plan

Architectural models of the proposed Federal Triangle development were unveiled in late April 1929. Design work on the Independent Offices, Justice, and Labor buildings also began at that time. After these models were unveiled, the Board made changes to the Federal Triangle construction plan to reflect the March and April changes made by Hoover and Mellon. Now only seven large structures were planned, and assigned to the following board members for design:

- Apex Building (formerly the Independent Offices building, and now assigned to house the United States Coast Guard) - Bennett
- Commerce Department building - Ayers (of the firm York and Sawyer)
- Internal Revenue Service building - Simon
- Justice Department building - Medary
- Labor Department/Interstate Commerce Commission (ICC) building, and Departmental Auditorium - Brown
- National Archives building - Pope
- Post Office Department building - Delano

Two major changes to the complex came in early 1930. The Board and other planning groups had long agreed to site the Justice Department building on the block bounded by 7th, 9th, and B Streets NW and Pennsylvania Avenue NW. This plan changed in March 1930. Architect John Russell Pope made a proposal to have the Justice and Archives switch sites so that the Justice building would have more space. Although the change would entail major design alterations in both buildings, Secretary Mellon favored the idea. The Commission on Fine Arts approved the plan.

In late March 1930, Mellon met with the Board of Architectural Consultants to discuss the idea. Although this initial meeting left the issue unresolved, the Board later agreed to Mellon's wishes in April and the two buildings switched plots. At the end of April, President Hoover asked Congress to appropriate $10.3 million, the most yet, to build a new Post Office Department building between 12th and 13th Streets NW, from Pennsylvania Avenue NW south to C Street NW.

Parking and traffic issues proved immensely vexing for the planners of Federal Triangle. The original L'Enfant Plan setting out the streets of Washington, D.C., still existed in the Federal Triangle area. Both C Street NW and D Street NW still ran from 15th Street NW to 15th Street NE. Ohio Avenue NW ran in a northwest–southeast line from the intersection of D and 15th Streets NW to the intersection of B and 12th Streets NW, soon to be renamed as Constitution Avenue NW and 12th Street NW. Louisiana Avenue NW still ran in a southwest–northeast direction from 10th and B Streets NW to 7th and D Streets NW, along what is currently the diagonal portion Indiana Avenue NW.

The McMillan Plan was developed before the widespread use of the automobile, and now the Board of Architectural Consultants had to decide how to accommodate the "horseless carriage" while also making Federal Triangle pedestrian-friendly. The Board began studying traffic issues in late 1927. A major study of parking needs and solutions was conducted in 1931, and traffic and parking patterns assessed again after the Department of Commerce building opened in early 1932. To achieve some of the traffic and parking goals, the east–west streets and diagonal avenues were eliminated, leaving only the north–south streets through the area, and 12th and 9th Streets NW were submerged in tunnels beneath the National Mall.

In the first major change to the Board's "final" plans, the Grand Plaza was abandoned in favor of a parking lot. The Board considered a number of other solutions to the need to accommodate the more than 7,500 cars expected to arrive every day (including an underground bus terminal and underground parking garage under the Grand Plaza), but in the end only approved a small number of underground parking spaces beneath the Apex Building.

=== Design influences ===
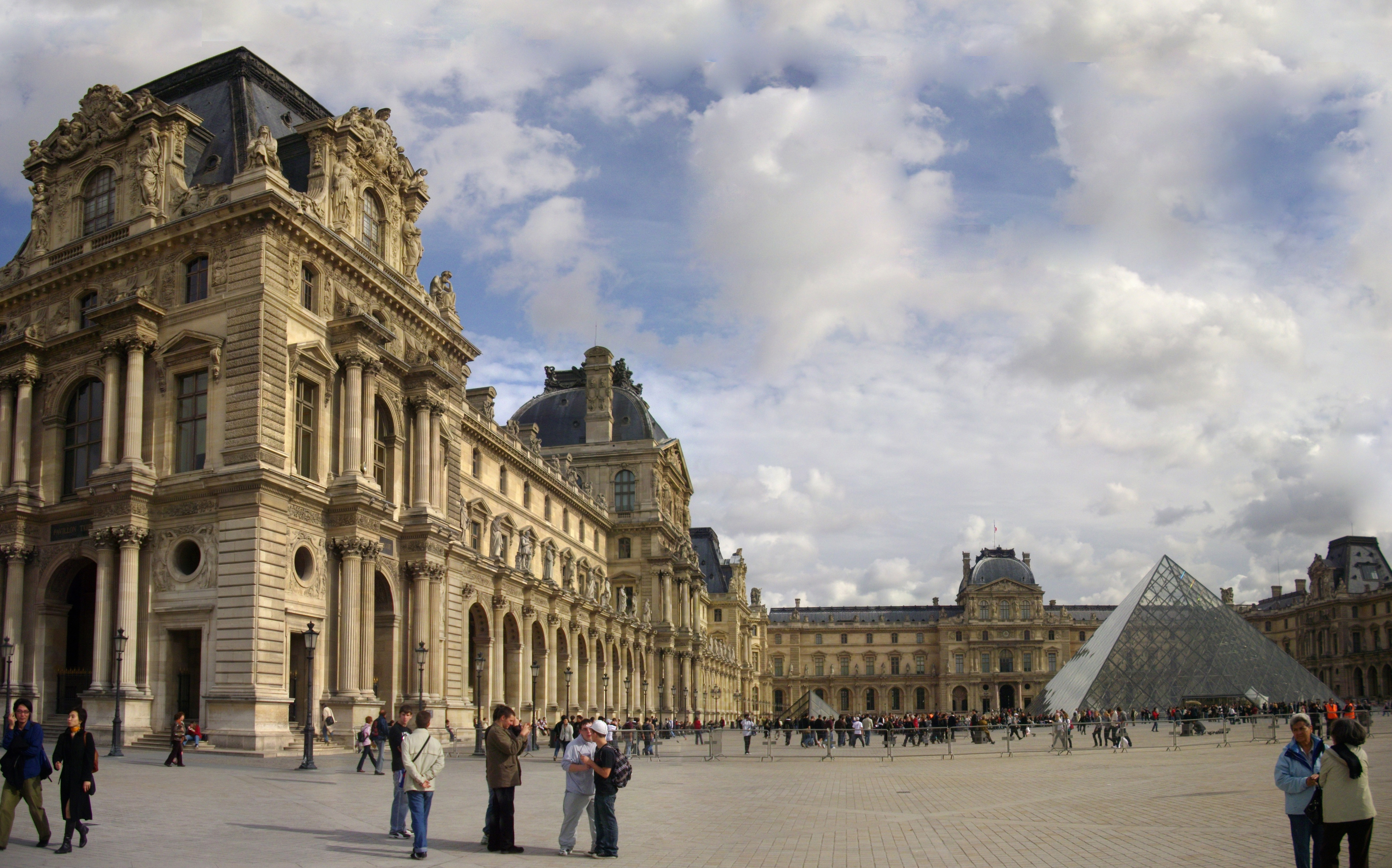
The Louvre Palace in Paris served as an inspiration for the Federal Triangle complex.

The design of Federal Triangle was significantly influenced by the Louvre-Tuileries Palace complex in France and the concentration of government buildings in Whitehall in the United Kingdom. But planning for the complex was also deeply influenced by the City Beautiful movement and the idea of creating a civic center to achieve efficiency in administration as well as reinforce the public's perception of government as authoritative and permanent. For the architectural style of the buildings, the Board relied heavily on the McMillan Plan's recommendation of the Neoclassical style.

Both the Board and Treasury Secretary Andrew W. Mellon rejected the Modern style then heavily in vogue. Rather than a mass of tall, imposing buildings, two unifying open spaces, intended for ceremonial use, and under discussion by the Board at least by March 1928, would be utilized. The first would be a Circular Plaza, inspired by the Place Vendôme, bisected by 12th Street NW, and which would require the demolition of the Old Post Office Pavilion. The second would be a rectangular Grand Plaza on the east side of 14th Street NW between the proposed Department of Commerce building (west side of 14th Street NW) and the proposed Post Office Department building, on the east side of 13th Street NW. The construction of the Grand Plaza would have required the demolition of the District Building.

The Board received significant input from the Commission of Fine Arts, which strongly advocated implementation of the McMillan Plan, the National Capital Parks and Planning Commission, and the Washington Board of Trade. One guiding principle for the project was that office space for at least 25,000 federal workers must be included. Another was that, although the buildings would be modern steel frame structures, they would each be the same height and faced with limestone. The National Capital Parks and Planning Commission had the least influence over the overall design of the project, primarily because it had only recently been formed.

Although the Board unveiled its proposed design for the project in 1929, the design still lacked a unifying architectural look. Subsequently, John Russell Pope was asked in September 1929 to bring a more uniform style to the buildings. Nonetheless, within this more uniform approach, a variety of styles could be used, and were: Italian Renaissance for the Department of Commerce building, Corinthian for the National Archives building, and Ionic for the Post Office Department. Meanwhile, the Board worked with sculptors, painters, and others to design more than 100 statues, fountains, bronze doors, murals, plaques, and panels, both interior and exterior, throughout the complex. Modern architectural styles were not completely ignored in the design effort. Most of the doors and grillwork throughout the Federal Triangle complex were Art Deco in style.

== Construction of original seven buildings ==
=== Beginning: Hoover administration ===
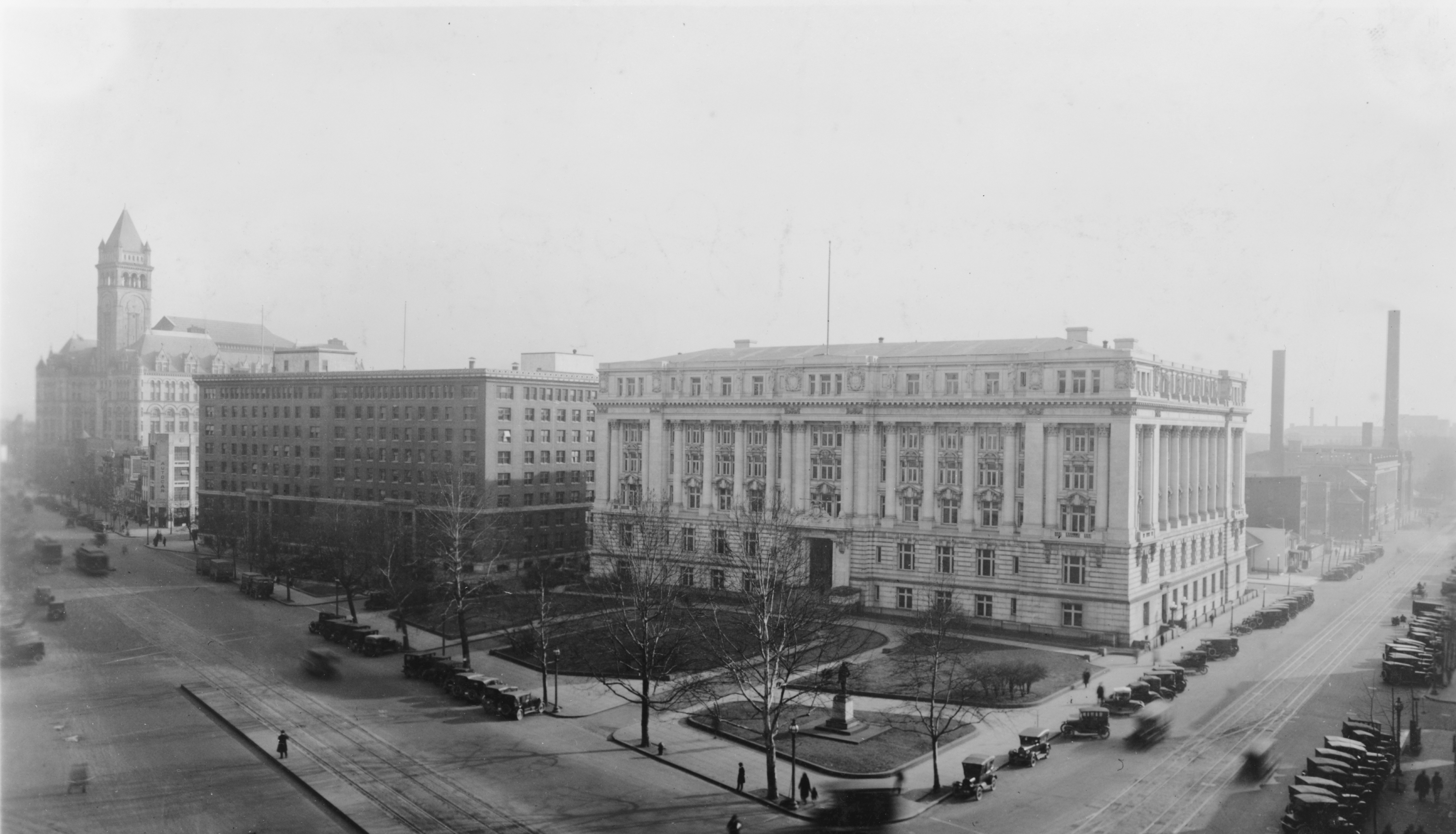
The Old Post Office Pavilion (left), Southern Railway Building (middle), and District Building on Pennsylvania Avenue in Washington, D.C., in December 1932

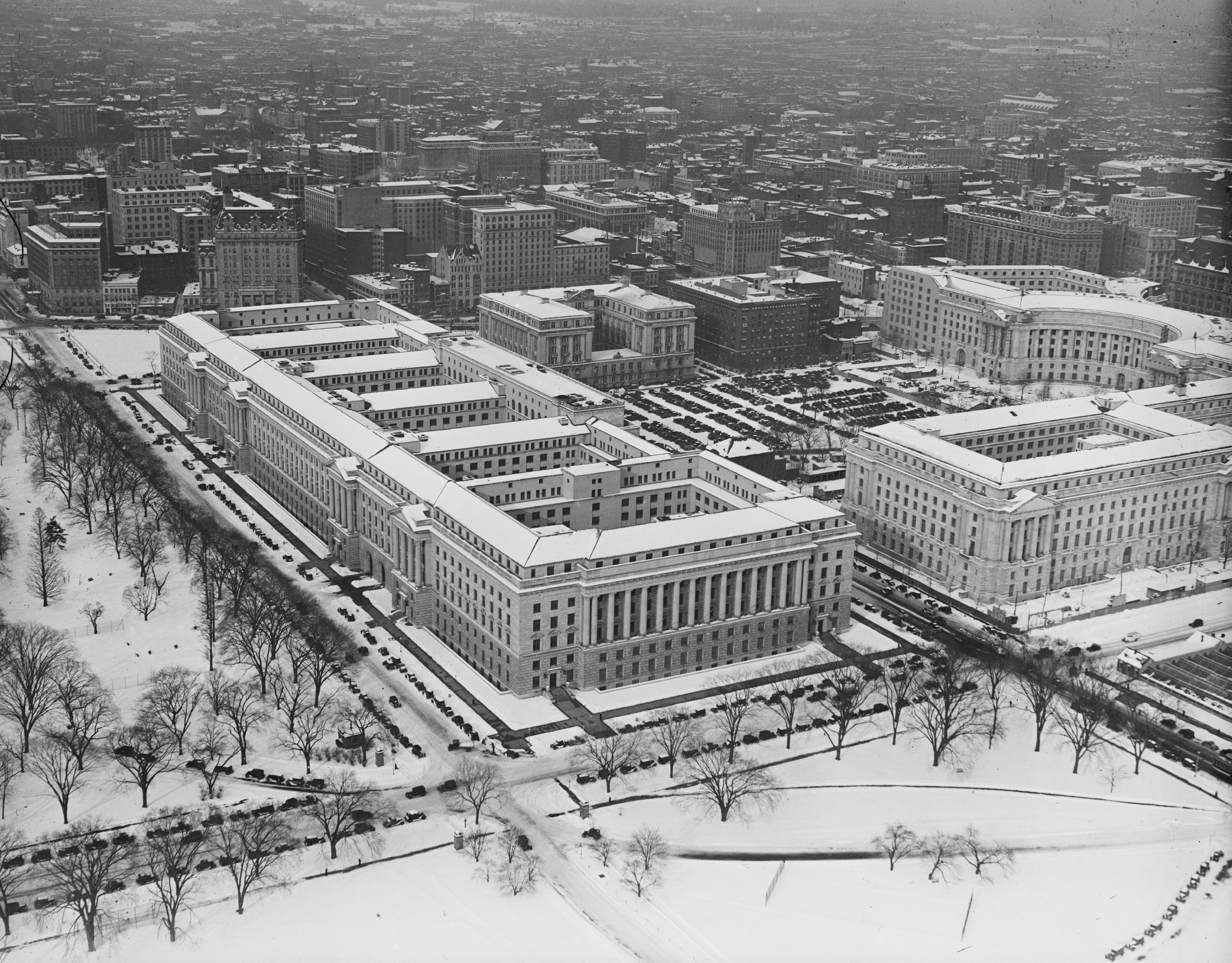
A 1934 aerial photo of the western portion of Federal Triangle

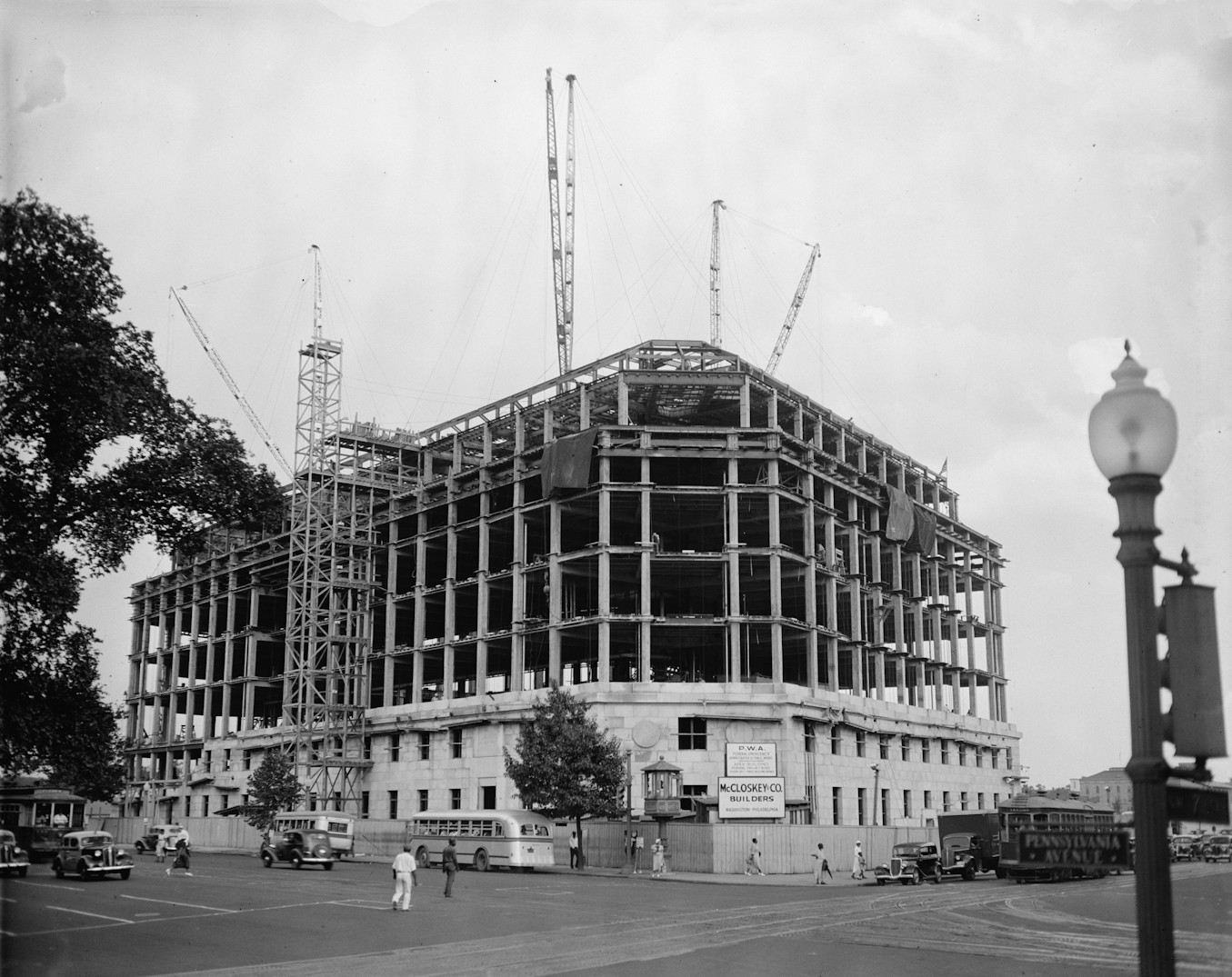
The Apex Building on Federal Triangle under construction in 1937

The U.S. Treasury Department signed a contract to raze the buildings on the site of the planned Internal Revenue Service building in October 1926. The length of the Commerce building was set at 1,000 feet (300 m) in March 1927, and survey work at the site began on March 31, 1927 (even though final plans for the project were still unclear). Work on all buildings was postponed in May 1927. Work began again in September 1927, with demolition work on the Commerce and Internal Revenue sites. Excavation of both sites began on November 21, 1927. Additional demolition contracts were awarded for both sites in April 1928, and foundation work for the Internal Revenue building began in June 1928. Some 8,000 pilings were driven into the soft ground to support the foundation. Work on Internal Revenue's superstructure began on March 8.

The cornerstone of the first building to be constructed, the Internal Revenue building, was laid by Treasury Secretary Andrew W. Mellon on May 25, 1929. While digging its foundation, workers uncovered a dock which was at least 100 years old. Indiana limestone was used for the facing, and Tennessee marble for the columns. The sites of all the Triangle buildings had been established in their revised positions by May 1929, with two exceptions: The positions of the Justice and Archives buildings remained as originally planned (with Justice in the east), and the apex space remained unallotted. President (and former Commerce Secretary) Herbert Hoover laid the cornerstone of the Commerce building on June 10, 1929, using the same trowel President George Washington had used to lay the cornerstone of the U.S. Capitol. The construction contract for the Commerce building (set at $13.567 million) had been signed in March, and the contract for its limestone facade—according to at least one newspaper account, the largest stone contract in world history—was awarded in April. By then, the cost of the Commerce building had risen to $17.5 million. Due to the formerly marshy condition of the soil and several submerged streams nearby, more than 18,000 pilings had to be set to support the Commerce building. Water pressure from the submerged Tiber Creek made it too difficult to drive the piles, so a deep-sea diver descended into the underground Tiber Creek and drilled a hole 20 feet (6.1 metres) deep into the earth. A hose was inserted into the hole, and water pumped from the earth until the water table dropped and the driving of the piles could be accomplished. The October 1929 stock market crash and subsequent Great Depression led newly elected President Herbert Hoover to increase spending on existing public works as a means of stimulating the economy. No funds had been authorized yet for the Archives, Independent Offices, Justice, or Labor buildings, and Hoover secured an additional $2.5 million a year for 10 years from Congress for this purpose. Work on the Justice and Independent Offices/Labor buildings now proceeded.

Treasury officials hoped to have the Post Office building under construction and ground broken for the Justice building by December 1930. But a major design change and funding choices were made in 1930. Pope convinced the Commission on Fine Arts to switch the positions of the Department of Justice and National Archives, giving the Justice building more space. Congress also amended the Public Buildings Act to permit private (not just federally employed) architects to bid on design contracts, and agreed to fund the construction of the Justice, Labor/ICC, National Archives, and Post Office buildings.

1931 saw much of the Federal Triangle project near completion. In March 1931, Congress appropriated $3 million to begin construction of the Apex Building, the last structure to be funded. Demolition began on the site the following November. The Internal Revenue building was completed and occupied in June. It was finished a year ahead of schedule, and contained more than 672,000 square feet (62,500 square meters) of office space (3.4 percent more than originally planned). But work had yet to begin on the Justice, Labor, or Post Office buildings. Work on the ICC building finally began in April 1931 when the two blocks for the site began to be razed, and 13th Street NW was permanently blocked off at that time. The first work on the Post Office site began in July with demolition as well. Demolition of existing structures on the Archives site ended in August 1931, and ground was finally broken on September 5. Meanwhile, razing of the ICC/Labor site was also completed by the first of September, and excavation work began shortly thereafter.

In 1932, the Commerce building opened and construction began on three additional buildings at Federal Triangle. The Department of Commerce building opened on January 4, 1932. The finished building had 1,605,066 square feet (148,271.1 square metres) of office space (more than 60 percent larger than originally planned), and its foundation was more than three feet thick in places in order to withstand the hydraulic pressure put on it by the submerged Tiber Creek. Water from the Tiber was utilized as an air conditioning system, to cool the building. July saw the construction contract for the $7.67 million Justice Department building signed. Although some funds for Federal Triangle projects had not been appropriated yet, work still went ahead using funds from other projects which were behind schedule. On September 26, 1932, the 143rd anniversary of the founding of the U.S. Postal Service, President Hoover laid the cornerstone of the Post Office Department building (although the foundation had already been laid, and the steel superstructure of the building was already three stories high). Once again, Hoover used the trowel which George Washington had used to lay the Capitol's cornerstone. Congress had appropriated $10.3 million for the new structure, which was designed to accommodate more than 3,000 workers. Its eight stories would be laid on a granite foundation and the sides clad in limestone. On December 1, 1932, the contract for construction of the limestone National Archives building (whose estimated construction cost was $5.284 million) was awarded to the George A. Fuller Company (which had constructed the New York Times Building and the Flatiron Building). Hoover laid two cornerstones on December 15 for the Labor/ICC building, the third building to begin construction that year. Workers who were Freemasons assisted the President in laying the cornerstones. Hoover personally oversaw the dedication of the cornerstone at the Labor end of the building. His words were broadcast over loudspeaker to the workers at the ICC end of the structure, who placed the ICC cornerstone simultaneously at the President's instruction (becoming the first time in Washington history that a single person dedicated two cornerstones at the same time). William Green, President of the American Federation of Labor, attended the laying of the cornerstone for the Labor building. Once more, Hoover used the trowel used by Washington to lay the cornerstone of the Capitol. Two weeks later, on December 30, the concrete foundation of the Archives building was poured.

Two days before George Washington's birthday, U.S. President Herbert Hoover laid the cornerstone of the National Archives building on February 20, 1933. The structure's cost was set at $8.75 million. Just three days later, he laid the cornerstone of the Department of Justice building with a trowel made from wood and cooper nails from the USS Constitution. Chief Justice Charles Evans Hughes, Associate Justice Harlan Fiske Stone, Associate Justice Owen Roberts, Associate Justice James Clark McReynolds, Solicitor General Thomas D. Thacher, and Attorney General William D. Mitchell all attended the ceremony. Five months later, a small fire at the Post Office construction site was extinguished by a security guard before it could do any damage. Late in 1933, the northern addition to the Internal Revenue building (the land had been condemned in December 1930) began to rise.

=== Completion: Roosevelt administration ===
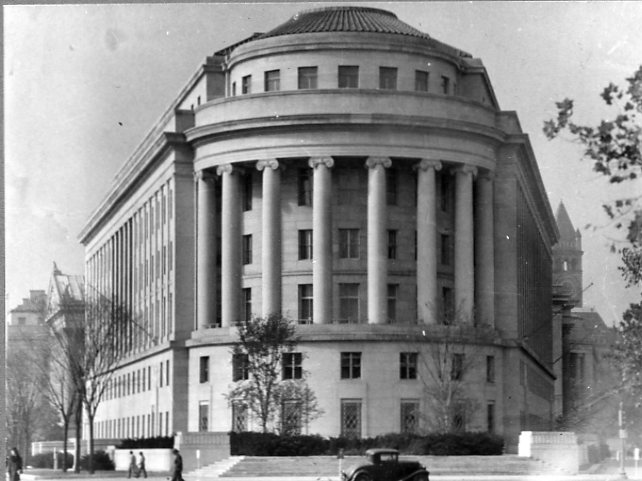
The completed Apex Building in 1940

Only one building remained to be constructed under the new administration of President Franklin D. Roosevelt. By December 1933, the President was preparing his proposal to Congress for full funding of the Apex Building construction project. But the Apex Building itself almost was not built, as Pope and others argued that it tended to hide the planned National Archives building. Still others thought the site should be used for the proposed Jefferson Memorial. Through Roosevelt's personal intervention, the building was saved—but nearly all its external ornamentation was stripped, and plans for a terraced fountain nearby eliminated, although a small fountain was built in what eventually became known as Patrick Henry Park. Construction of the building was re-approved on January 18, 1934. The building's final cost was estimated at just over $12 million.

In 1934, one building began construction and another finished. The Apex Building site began to be cleared in April. The Post Office building was occupied on May 6, and Postmaster General James Farley dedicated the Post Office Department building on June 11, 1934. Its final cost was $10.83 million, about half a million dollars over budget. Construction in the rest of the Triangle, however, seemed stalled. Although some structures had been razed on the site, no appropriation had been made for the Apex Building. The government had also cleared land northeast of the Internal Revenue building (as planners considered adding yet another building to the Triangle), but Congress was increasingly opposed to demolishing either the Old Post Office or the District Building. City officials considered selling the District Building to the federal government as a means of raising cash to build a new city hall, but federal officials balked at the idea. President Roosevelt dedicated the newly opened Department of Justice building on October 25, 1934. Chief Justice Hughes, all the Associate Justices of the Supreme Court, Attorney General Homer Stille Cummings, and a large number of foreign ambassadors also attended the dedication. The $11 million structure had more than 550,000 square feet (51,200 square meters) of office space. By November 1934, the addition to the Internal Revenue building was nearing completion, and government officials were contemplating the razing of the District Building, Old Post Office Pavilion, and Southern Railway Building.

The Labor/ICC and Archives buildings were opened in 1935. Numerous strikes (see below) had delayed the opening of the building for almost a year. In April 1934, Secretary of Labor Frances Perkins asked for additional (if minor) design changes. Pressing needs for office space meant that a portion of the ICC building was occupied before the structure was finished. Minor alterations were made to the Labor building (such as creating a private rather than shared bathroom for the female Secretary) in January 1935. Secretary of Labor Frances Perkins dedicated the two buildings at a ceremony in the Departmental Auditorium on February 26, 1935, attended by AFL President William Green. The Labor building's final cost was $4.5 million and the ICC portion of the structure cost $4.45 million. The two buildings were connected by the 2,000-seat Departmental Auditorium (renamed the Andrew W. Mellon Auditorium in 1987). Meanwhile, construction forged ahead on the Archives building. Already considered too small to hold all the materials in its possession, a proposal had been made to add another story to the building. This proposal was rejected in March 1935. The National Archives building was occupied in November 1935, but had no formal dedication. Although the Archives structure had been one of the top priorities of almost all planners, it was one of the last buildings to be opened. Archives staff began moving into the building in November 1935, and the exhibition rotunda was opened to the public in November 1936. Records were not transferred in large numbers to the building until April 1937.

The Apex Building was the last to be constructed and dedicated. A major impetus for the building's construction came in June 1935, when the Federal Trade Commission's (FTC) headquarters at C Street NW and 21st Street NW was razed to make way for the Federal Reserve Board Building. The FTC petitioned the Commission on Fine Arts to permit it to occupy the Apex Building. Testing for the foundation began in September 1936, and was completed shortly thereafter. With design work long completed and President Roosevelt expressing his wish that the structure be built, a $3.1 million contract for the building was signed on December 29, 1936. Using the George Washington trowel, President Roosevelt laid the cornerstone for the building on July 12, 1937. The building's $3.665 million cost was paid for out of Public Works Administration funds, and officials estimated it would be ready for occupation by January 1, 1938. Demolition of the old foundation for the unbuilt Washington Memorial occurred in July 1937, and much of the Apex Building's steel superstructure was rising by then as well. The great depth of the building's foundation meant that the crane operator lifting the steel beams into place was out of sight in the basement, and a series of telephone links from observers on the street relayed instructions to him. By December 1937, the building was two months ahead of schedule.

Reliefs are found on numerous buildings throughout the complex

A relief of a female figure.

A relief of a male figure.

One of the most important aspects of the new building was the group of massive sculptures to be installed on either side of the structure. A jury of four nationally known sculptors (Paul Manship, Adolph Alexander Weinman, Lee Lawrie, and William E. Parsons) selected the artist in January 1938. The winner was Michael Lantz, an award-winning instructor in sculpting then employed by the Works Progress Administration. The Apex Building had no dedication. The commission and staff moved into the 125,000 square foot (11,625 square metres) building on April 21, 1938.

Artwork, exterior details, landscaping, and other finishing touches on the construction of Federal Triangle occupied the period from 1938 to 1947. Landscaping issues of the Grand Plaza and Circular Plaza were considered in January 1934. To protect Federal Triangle from flooding by the Potomac River (as had happened in 1871), the north and west grounds of the Washington Monument were raised in the summer of 1938 by about six feet (two metres) in order to form a dike against any future floodwaters. The final art installation in the complex was the Oscar Straus Memorial Fountain, designs for which were first considered in December 1933. Plans for the memorial were brought before President Roosevelt for his approval the same month. Discussion continued into 1934. The Federal Triangle project was considered complete with the installation of the Straus Memorial in 1947.

But the Great Plaza was never built. Instead, the area was turned into a parking lot.

== Federal Triangle and the Bonus Army ==
In June 1932, thousands of homeless World War I veterans, their families, and their supporters occupied the recently condemned assemblage of buildings at the Federal Triangle site as part of the Bonus March on the capital to win better veterans' benefits.

On July 28, 1932, President Hoover ordered General Douglas MacArthur to remove the "Bonus Army" from the site. At 4:45 p.m., MacArthur led 1,200 infantry, 1,200 cavalry, and six battle tanks, commanded by Major George S. Patton, to Federal Triangle to remove the Bonus Army. More than 20,000 civil service workers, leaving their offices for the day, watched as the U.S. Army attacked its own veterans.

Patton personally led a cavalry charge, with sabers drawn, into the mass of homeless people, and several hundred rounds of vomit gas were launched at the marchers. A Bonus marcher was killed on the site of the Apex Building. The Federal Triangle site was cleared and these members of the Bonus Army marched to Anacostia—where, at 10:14 p.m., MacArthur led a second attack on the 43,000 protesters and burned their camp to the ground.

== Labor issues during 1930s construction ==
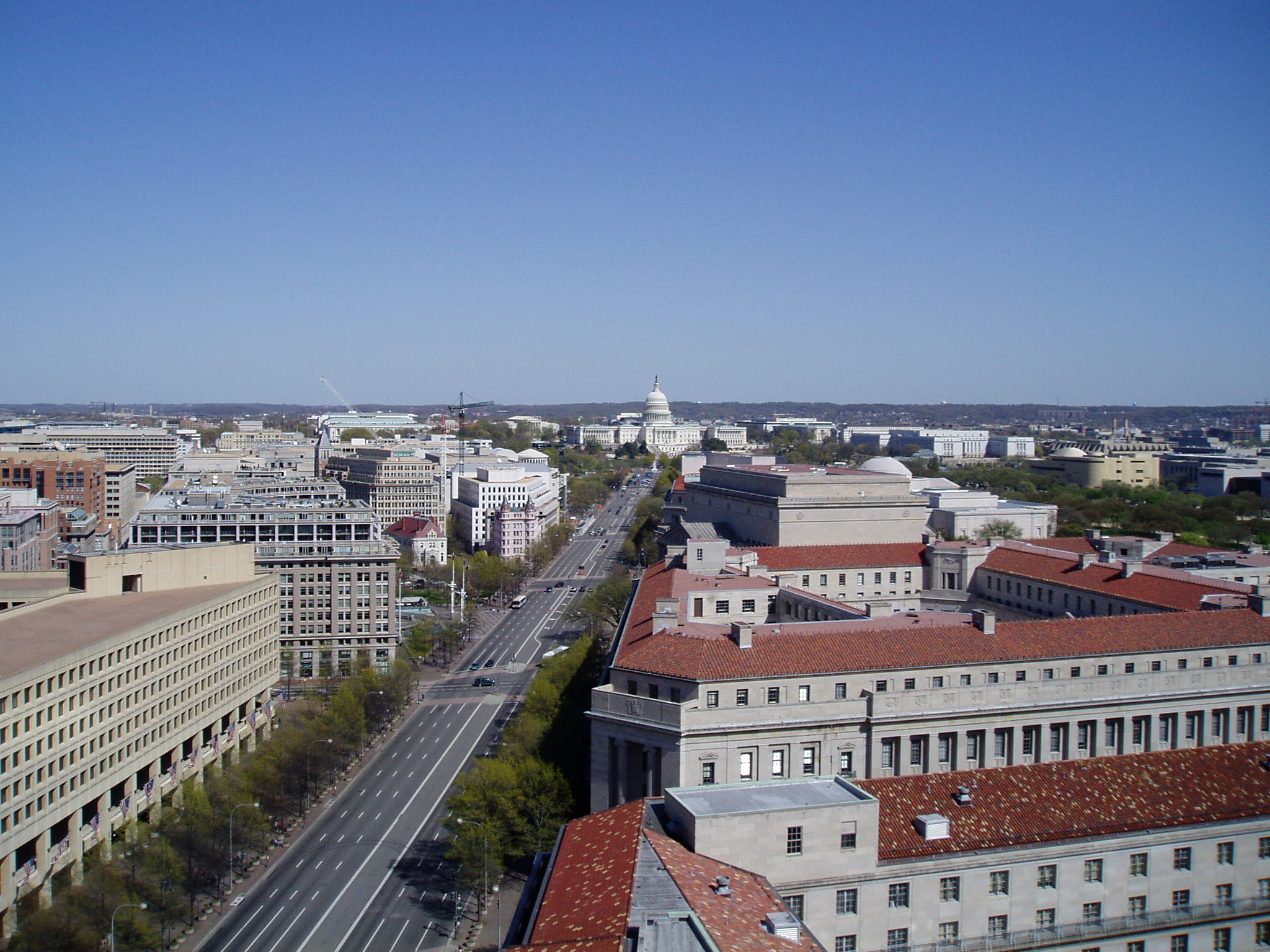
A photo of Pennsylvania Avenue NW and the red rooftops of Federal Triangle, the Internal Revenue Building addition, the U.S. Department of Justice, the National Archives (square-topped building), the rotunda belongs of the National Gallery of Art, and the U.S. Capitol in the distance

Architectural detail of an arched walkway

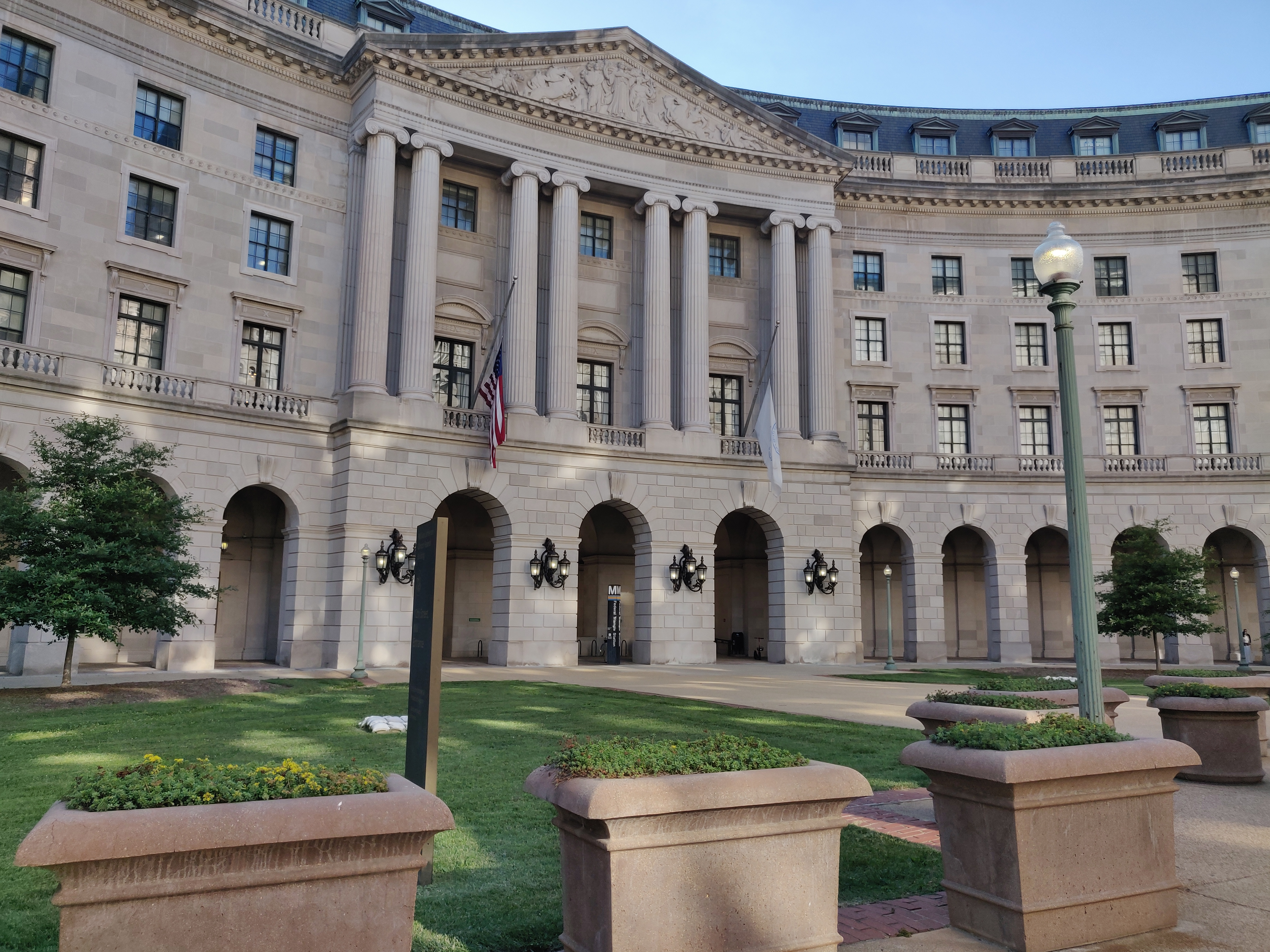
The William Jefferson Clinton Federal Building, completed in 1934

Labor-management troubles occurred throughout construction of the initial seven buildings in the Federal Triangle complex in the 1920s and 1930s. Much of Washington, D.C.'s, construction workforce was unionized many years before the project began. All the building contractors employed by the federal government signed three-year contracts with the major labor unions representing their workers in September 1929, in the hope that this would eliminate any disruptions during the building program. But this hope proved false.

The first problem occurred in July 1930, when the lathers union went on strike to win a $2 per day (16.7 percent) pay increase, halting work for a short period of time on the Archives, Interstate Commerce, Justice, Labor, and Post Office sites. A second strike occurred in late summer 1931 over a new federal wage law. The Davis–Bacon Act was passed by Congress and signed into law by President Hoover on March 3, 1931.

On August 4, 1931, painters working on the Internal Revenue building went on strike, arguing that out-of-town workers were being imported into the city to work on the building and being paid $5-to-$7 a day rather than the prevailing local wage rate of $11 a day. Both the Treasury and Labor Departments stepped in to arbitrate the strike. The dispute was settled a few days later when the Labor Department found that the contractor had paid the correct wages, and that no workers were being paid overtime.

The construction project's labor troubles worsened in 1933. With the Depression deepening, contractors were pressing for a 27.3 percent wage cut with their unions, particularly the carpenters' union. On January 6, 1933, a fire swept through the upper floors of the unfinished ICC building. The fire was ruled arson and a "disgruntled carpenter" was suspected. Two weeks later, the operating engineers and steamfitters unions engaged in a jurisdictional strike against one another, stopping work at the Post Office construction site, but the AFL intervened and arbitrated a solution to the dispute.

The earlier wage dispute had not been resolved, and by February a general strike among all unionized workers at the Federal Triangle complex seemed likely. Employers said they would fire all unionized workers if a strike occurred and replace them with strikebreakers. The two sides agreed to let the Treasury Department arbitrate their dispute, and on February 13 the government ruled in favor of the unions—averting a job action. The employers went to court, and in April 1933 the carpenters union agreed to the 27.3 percent wage cut.

The second major wage dispute of 1933 broke out in May. On May 26, more than 500 members of the plasterers' union went on strike to prevent a $2 (14.3 percent) pay cut, halting all work on the seven active Federal Triangle constructions sites. The employers and the American Institute of Architects both argued that the higher wage would inhibit economic recovery in the construction industry. To prove their point, the employers locked out the workers; the strike collapsed, and plasterers went back to work on July 22.

August 1933 saw the eruption of a series of labor-management disputes and inter-union squabbles that put construction of the Federal Triangle complex on hold for several months. The first event was when the Journeyman Stonecutters Association of North America walked out on a jurisdictional strike against the iron workers' union on August 21, idling 225 men working on the Post Office building. The dispute was over which union would ride with crane operators to coordinate the movement of loads with workers on the ground. The strike lasted at least until September 7, with both sides seeking a decision from the American Federation of Labor.

On September 1, 75 carpenters walked off the job in a jurisdictional dispute with the iron worker's union. This dispute, which occurred at the Labor/ICC building, was over which workers would be permitted to install decorative enclosures around radiators. With work on the Labor/ICC buildings already two months behind schedule due to the earlier labor disputes, the employers threatened to stop all work if the carpenters' union struck and throw another 1,000 men out of work. The employers shut down on September 15. Twenty security guards were stationed at the Labor/ICC building to prevent vandalism.

On September 18, a third jurisdictional strike occurred when the boilermakers' union walked off the job at the Federal Triangle central heating plant to protest the use of iron workers in the erection of smokestacks for the facility. Construction of the smokestacks continued, but construction of the boilers was halted. A fourth jurisdictional strike erupted on September 20, when 80 members of the bricklayers' union walked off the job at the heating plant to protest the use of laborers to caulk windows, stone, and roof tiles. Although the bricklayers remained on the job for the moment, government officials feared that sympathy strikes would occur, stopping work at all seven construction sites. The carpenters rejected a call for the government to arbitrate the strike, and the employers asked for Senator Robert F. Wagner (a proponent of organized labor) to help settle the disputes. On September 26, the AFL ruled that the smokestack work properly belonged to the iron workers, and ordered the boilermakers back to work. But the carpenters' union initiated a new protest, arguing that the installation of pulley linings in elevators belonged to them and not to the elevator constructors' union. And the Washington Building and Construction Trades Council threatened to call a general strike of all construction workers if the bricklayers were not pulled off the job installing boiler insulation and the asbestos workers' union allowed to do the job instead. Senator Wagner also said on Sept. 28 that he believed a resolution to the carpenters/iron workers dispute (which had led to the layoff of 1,000 workers at the Labor/ICC building) could be reached. But the boilermakers did not return to work, leaving 450 workers laid off. Meanwhile, government officials said that the caulking, insulation, and pulley work disputes would be resolved soon, and would not in any case cause further disruptions at construction sites. Another major work disruption threatened the Federal Triangle complex when the iron workers' union demanded that contractors initiate two four-hour shifts per day rather than one eight-hour shift per day in order to spread work among more men. When contractors balked, the union struck at the Post Office and Justice building sites. That strike lasted two days before about half of the employers capitulated. But it continued for the remaining employers at the Justice and Post Office buildings. Finally, on October 11, 1933, frustrated and angry Labor Department officials said that unless the jurisdictional disputes were ended quickly, the government would seek authorization from Congress in January to force the unions back to work and resolve the disputes itself. The threat worked: On October 13, all parties to all jurisdictional disputes agreed to return to work while continuing to seek resolution to their problems via other channels. Federal officials excoriated the carpenters' union for holding up a $40,000-a-week payroll for four weeks over an $800 job. Eleven days later, the iron workers' union agreed to return to the eight-hour shift.

The labor peace was short-lived. Four unions refused to do work on the Post Office conveyor belt system in mid-November, and the dispute over elevators spread to the Labor/ICC building in February 1934 (delaying the building's opening indefinitely). On February 14, 1934, 225 carpenters engaged in a jurisdictional strike against the cement finishers' union at the Labor/ICC building over the installation of tile flooring. The dispute was elevated to AFL President William Green, Green awarded the job to the cement finishers on March 17. But just three weeks later, the plasterers' union led a jurisdictional strike against the stonecutters' union at the Labor/ICC building because the stonecutters were installing acoustical marble columns. Contractors, angry at the repeated inter-union squabbles, announced they would no longer employ reduced-hour shifts or give pay raises. The carpenters' union called for a general strike of all unions at the Labor/ICC building on May 25, a strike which spread to the city's ice cream plants. That secondary strike ended June 4. But the general construction strike began to spread to other federal projects throughout the city, leading to an increasing number of calls for the strike to be settled by arbitration. As the work stoppage spread, the carpenters' union's contract with the construction companies expired on May 30. The employers declared on June 12 that they would no longer adhere to any closed shop agreements with the carpenters, and instead would impose the open shop and employ any carpenter (union or non-union) in order to finish the work on existing construction projects. The construction unions declared they would pull every worker off every job if non-union construction laborers were hired, and the D.C Metropolitan Police Department made preparations to patrol streets and job sites to prevent any violence from erupting. Non-union workers were hired, and the carpenters' union went on strike at all job sites throughout the city amidst fears that the carpenters might strike all federal construction projects nationwide. Three union members were injured on June 13 as picketers clashed with security guards hired by the employers. But the strike did not spread to the other unions, and the Washington Building and Construction Trades Council and D.C. Commissioner George E. Allen attempted to mediate an end to the strike. The carpenters rejected the arbitration attempt, and bands of roving picketers moving among construction sites led to traffic tie-ups, frightened citizens, and rumors of violence. The "open shop strike" ended on June 20, 1934, when the carpenters agreed to a new contract providing for a five-day, 40-hour work week and $1.25 an hour in pay. But no agreement was made regarding the open shop. The plasterers' union ended their strike in June 1934, and went to local district court to resolve the jurisdictional dispute.

The final labor dispute to affect the Federal Triangle complex construction was a jurisdictional strike over the installation of library shelving at the National Archives building in November 1935.

== Federal Triangle's first half-century ==
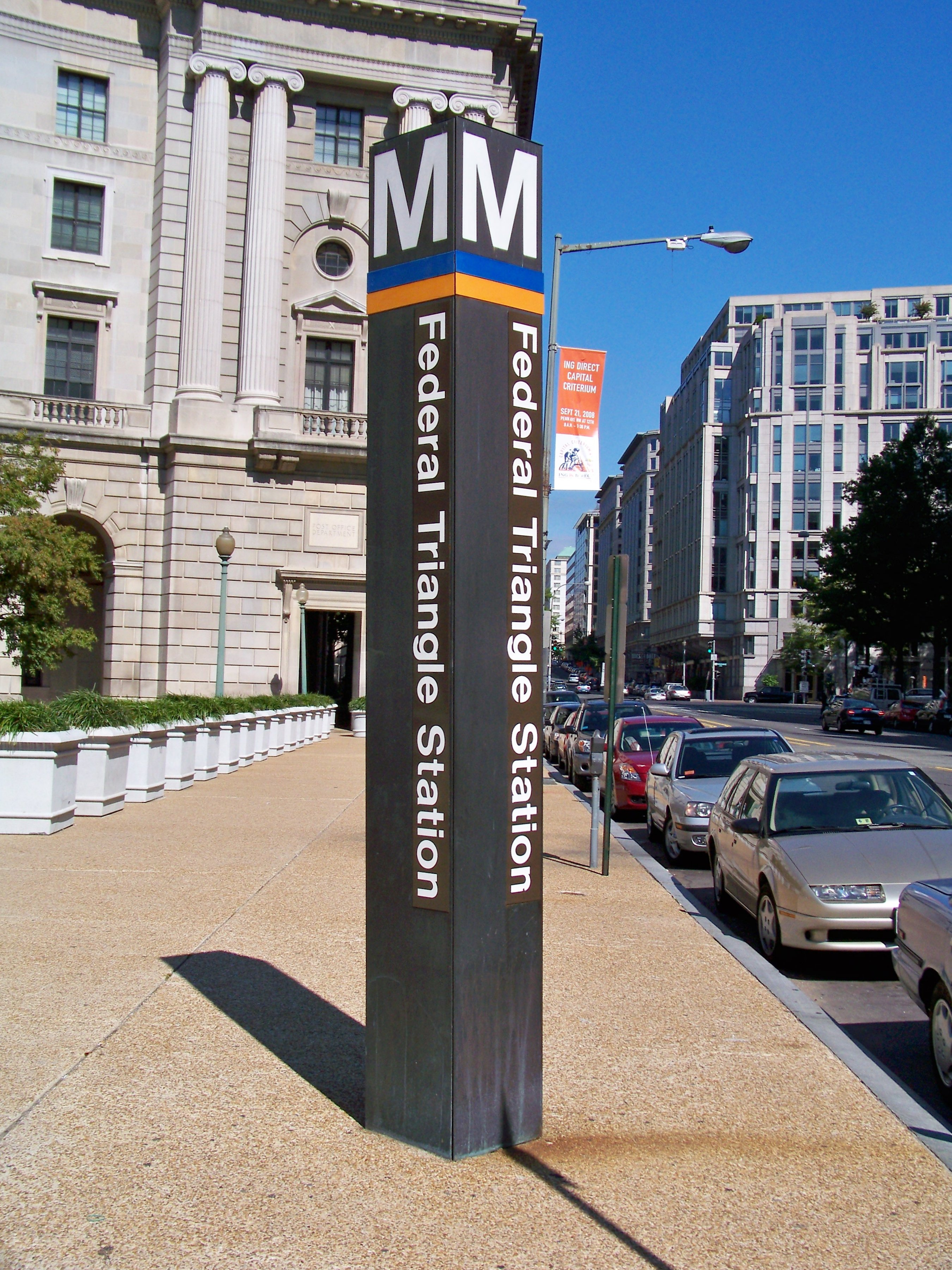
Federal Triangle station, the Washington Metro stop of Federal Triangle, opened in July 1977

The continuing existence of the District Building, Old Post Office Pavilion, and Southern Railway building as well as parking issues became points of contention during Federal Triangle's first 50 years. District of Columbia officials said in 1958 that they were willing to have the District Building torn down and Federal Triangle "finished" if the city was properly compensated, but a lack of federal funds defeated the move.

In 1995, the D.C. and federal governments signed an agreement in which the federal government would construct a new top floor and renovate the building (at a cost of $47 million) in return for a 20-year lease on 130,000 square feet (12,090 square metres) of space in the structure. In 1970, plans were developed to demolish most of the Old Post Office Pavilion, leaving only the bell tower. Opposition to the plan emerged. In 1971, plans were made to restore the building instead. In 1973, the General Services Administration (GSA) developed a plan save the Old Post Office Pavilion, and the National Capitol Planning Commission agreed to the project. An $18 million renovation began in 1977. The renovation was completed in 1983 to highly positive reviews.

In the late 1980s, plans were laid to double the size of the Old Post Office Pavilion's retail space to 75,000 square feet (6,975 square metres) in order to attract more shoppers to the building. Utilizing the provisions of the Public Buildings Cooperative Use Act of 1976, the retail space expansion was financed and completed in 1992. Despite the federal government's intention to demolish the Southern Railway Building and construct a federal office building on the site to complete the Federal Triangle complex, the building stood until 1971. It was demolished in that year, and turned into a parking lot.

As many critics had anticipated during Federal Triangle's construction in the 1930s, parking issues grew much worse due to the development's existence. In the late 1950s, a proposal was made to build a commuter and long-distance bus terminal at Federal Triangle as well as a large office building on the space of the parking lot, but the $60 million it would take to build the terminal was never provided. The parking issue became so vexing that the Eisenhower administration ordered its own parking study in 1959.

There were several attempts to remove the parking lot in the interior of Federal Triangle and build the long-planned Great Plaza. The first such move came in 1955, when the Commission of Fine Arts asked the federal government to build the plaza, but nothing came of the proposal. A second effort was made in 1972, with the goal of building the Great Plaza in time for the national bicentennial in 1976, but the required $36.7 million in federal funds were not forthcoming. The parking lot was leased to a private company in 1979.

Several other outstanding issues regarding Federal Triangle's development were also raised, and occasionally resolved, in the next half-century. The closure and elimination of Ohio and Louisiana Avenues NW led each state's representatives to seek to rename other streets in the District of Columbia after those states. Ohio Drive NW came into existence in 1949, after Congress passed legislation authorizing the name change of the drive along the Tidal Basin. Another issue remaining from Federal Triangle's development regarded the condemnation of railway tracks in the area. The Mount Vernon, Alexandria and Washington Railway argued that it had not been properly compensated for the loss of its tracks in the area, and in 1943 sought federal relief.

Some improvements were made to Federal Triangle. In 1952, the Andrew W. Mellon Memorial Fountain was dedicated within the eastern tip of the Triangle. A new cooling plant was built in 1960. Beginning in 1970, all the buildings were floodlit at night in order to reduce the level of crime in the area.

In 1972, the Federal Triangle Washington Metro station was approved at Federal Triangle, and the station on Metro's Blue and Orange lines opened on July 1, 1977. Major heating, cooling, and electrical upgrades were made to the Archives, ICC, and Labor buildings and the Departmental Auditorium in 1984.

After the terrorist bombing of the Alfred P. Murrah Federal Building in Oklahoma City on April 19, 1995 (which killed 168 people), security at Federal Triangle was tightened measurably and many of the pedestrian areas and buildings restricted to federal employees or those with official business. A major renovation for the Labor, ICC, and Post Office buildings was conducted in 1998.

== Ronald Reagan Building construction ==
=== Context ===
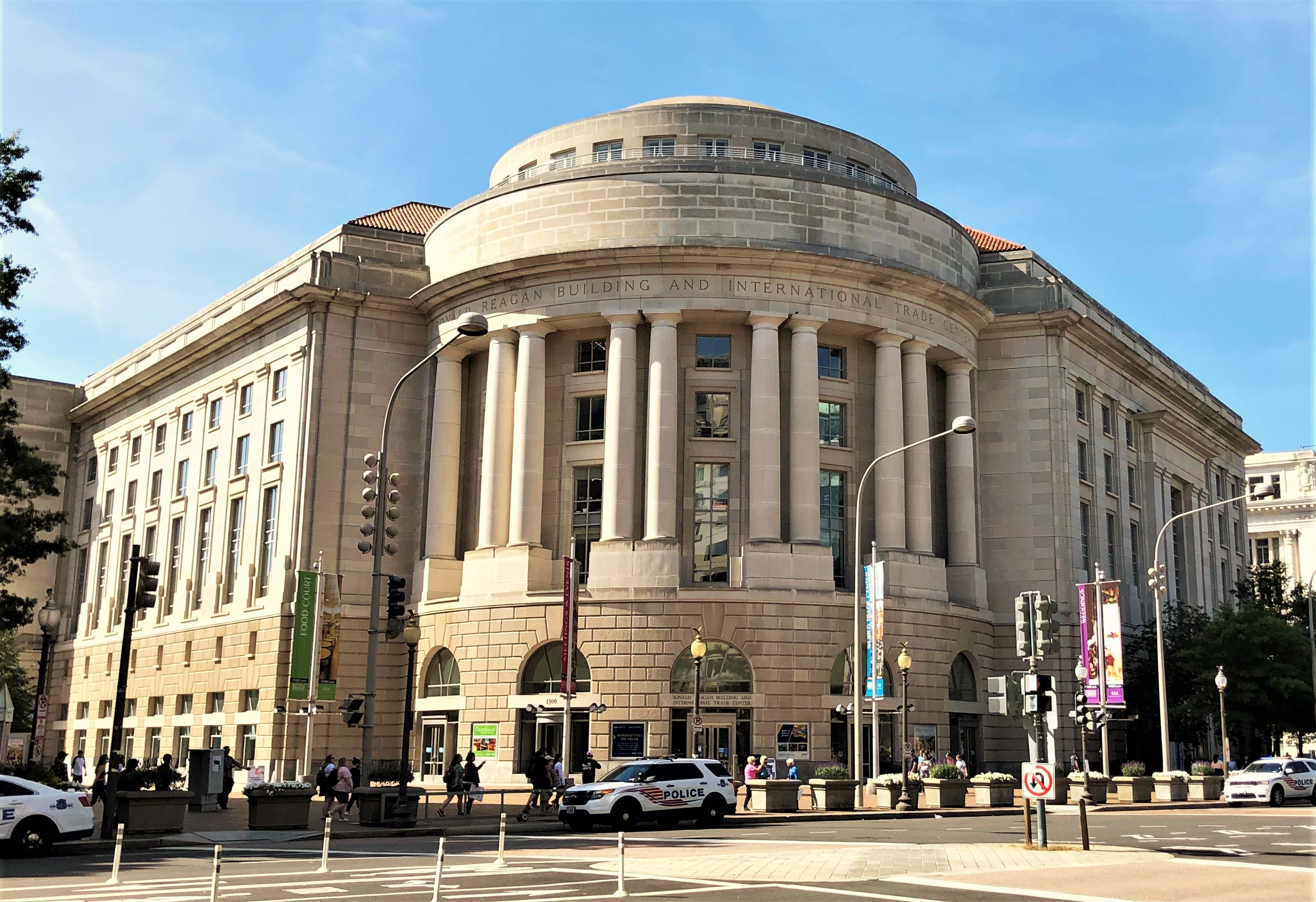
The Pennsylvania Avenue entrance to the Ronald Reagan Building

Even as parking and traffic issues continued to cause controversy at Federal Triangle in the 1960s and 1970s, efforts were under way to remove the parking lot and "finish" Federal Triangle by building a large office building on the site. The first effort came in 1972, when the Nixon administration proposed building a $126 million office building on the lot in time for the national bicentennial in 1976. This proposal was never seriously contemplated or funded. One outcome of the Nixon proposal, however, was "the Weese Plan." The Nixon administration commissioned the architecture planning firm of Harry Weese & Associates to come up with a master plan for the continued development of Federal Triangle.

The Master Plan, which became known as "the Weese Plan", did not only propose a massive new federal office building on the parking lots of the Triangle. It also proposed a new series of pedestrian paths throughout the complex, titled "Federal Walk." Federal Walk would not only be a network of sidewalks designed to showcase the architecture of Federal Triangle. It included destinations such as spots for tourists to wait for tours of the interiors of each building, outdoor art, places for rest and contemplation, and even cafes and restaurants. Federal Walk was gradually implemented in piecemeal fashion over the next 15 years, although it still remained incomplete as of 1997. GSA held a competition in 1982 to select a design for a 10-story office building to replace the parking lot, but planning bodies refused to approve the plan.

Plans for construction of an office building on the Federal Triangle parking lot site found support in 1986. The Federal City Council, a private civic organization which had been promoting the construction of a $200 million international trade center in the District of Columbia, advocated construction of its proposed building at Federal Triangle. Reagan administration officials favored the plan, and in October 1986 the proposal received the backing of the General Services Administration. The idea received support from Democrats in Congress as well, especially from Senator Daniel Patrick Moynihan, a former Kennedy administration aide who had long championed completion of Federal Triangle.

There was some opposition to the idea from planning officials and others, who were dismayed at the loss of parking in the downtown area and who feared that the trade center's proposed 1,300 to 2,600 underground parking slots would not be built due to poor soil conditions. A bill was passed (almost unanimously) by Congress on August 7, 1987, to provide $362 million for the construction of an "International Cultural and Trade Center" on the parking lot at Federal Triangle. The plan was to provide office space for both the Justice and State departments. The legislation also provided that although the U.S. government would finance the building, a private developer would construct it. The federal government would lease space from the private developer for 30 years, after which ownership of the building would revert to the government.

The bill required the building to be financially self-supporting within two years of its completion. The rental prices throughout the lease's term would remain stable. It was only the fifth time the government had signed a "lease-to-own" agreement. With 1.4 million square feet (130,200 square metres) of office space and 500,000 square feet (46,500 square metres) of space for trade center activities, the planned trade center would be larger than any other federally owned building except for The Pentagon.

The bill also required that the trade center be "designed in harmony with historical and government buildings in the vicinity, ... reflect the symbolic importance and historic character of Pennsylvania Avenue and the Nation's Capital, and ... represent the dignity and stability of the Federal Government." A nine-member panel was established to approve any plans, and included the Secretaries of State, Agriculture, and Commerce; the Mayor of the District of Columbia; and five members of the public. The building was expected to be completed in 1992. President Ronald Reagan signed the Federal Triangle Development Act into law on August 22, 1987.

=== Design and construction ===
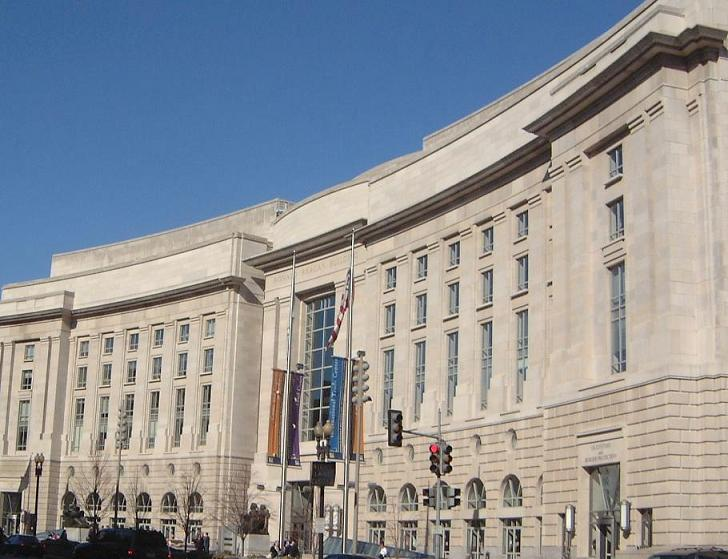
The 14th Street NW facade of the Ronald Reagan Building in 2006

Preliminary design specifications required that the final building be no taller than the existing Federal Triangle structures, be constructed of similar materials, emphasize pedestrian traffic, and have a "sympathetic" architectural style. An architectural model by the firms of Notter Finegold & Alexander, Mariani & Associates, and Bryant & Bryant depicted a building with a long, uninterrupted facade along 14th Street NW and two colonnaded hemicycles on the east side (matching the Post Office Department building's hemicycle).

The preliminary design specs were criticized for not more clearly specifying the architectural style, for bringing another 10,000 new workers to Federal Triangle each day, and for reducing the required number of parking spaces by 30 percent to just 1,300. The five public members of the design committee were named on April 6, 1988, and were former Senator Charles H. Percy, chair; Harry McPherson, president of the Federal City Council; Donald A. Brown, chair of the Federal City Council's International Center Task Force; Michael R. Garder, a member of the Pennsylvania Avenue Development Corporation; and Judah C. Sommer, a local attorney.

Groundbreaking on the now-$350 million building was scheduled for 1989, and completion in 1993. Disagreements broke out in mid-1988 over which federal agencies should take up residence in the structure, and whether they should be trade- or foreign-policy related. Seven designs were submitted in June 1989, each incorporating a base-middle-crown structure and enclosed in traditional materials (limestone facade, vertical glass windows, terra-cotta roof tiles). Each design incorporated a new home for the Woodrow Wilson International Center for Scholars (a Smithsonian Institution entity), an outdoor memorial to President Woodrow Wilson, and exhibition and retail space.

Construction began in mid-1989. Contractors estimated the cost of the building at between $550 million and $800 million, far higher than the anticipated $350 million original price tag. The design committee picked the $738.3 million design submitted by Pei Cobb Freed & Partners in October 1989. A consortium led by New York developer William Zeckendorf Jr. was chosen to build and operate the building and lease it to the government. One of the firms which had lost this contract subsequently challenged the bidding process.

=== Cancellation, completion, and opening ===
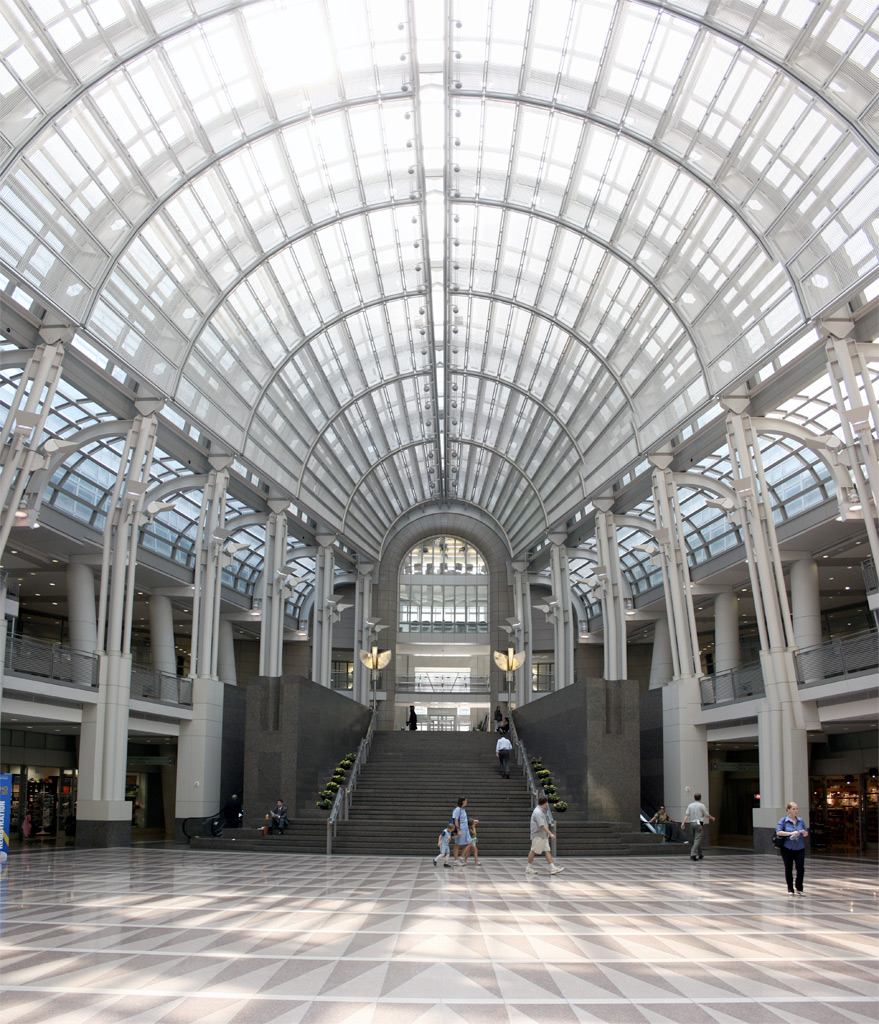
The interior atrium of the Ronald Reagan Building on Federal Triangle serves as a major event space.

Significant cost increases led to the project being mothballed by the George H. W. Bush administration. The General Services Administration refused to sign the draft lease, arguing that the building's rental costs were too high and would cost (rather than save) the government $18 million to $24 million a year. Although Pei Cobb Freed agreed to investigate design changes to make the project less costly, at least one member of Congress declared the project dead. In September 1990, the architectural team made changes which cut $82 million from the cost of the building (including the elimination of two theaters, scaling down the reception hall, using plaster rather than stone, substituting aluminum for bronze in the trim, and reducing the size of interior doors), reducing the price tag to $656 million.

Delta Partnership, a development consortium led by New York developer William Zeckendorf Jr., was chosen to operate the building and lease it to the government. Another design change came in January 1991, when the number of parking spaces rose by 12.6 percent to 2,500 spaces. But the changes did not resolve the controversies enveloping the project. Design committee member Donald A. Brown quit the committee in late 1991, complaining that the Bush administration was meddling in the project's design. Two days later, Eleanor Holmes Norton, D.C.'s delegate to Congress, repeated these charges. On January 19, 1992, even as the foundation for the trade center was being dug, the GSA said the building would not achieve financial self-sufficiency. A separate report commissioned by the Bush administration reached similar conclusions.

On January 25, 1992, the Bush administration cancelled the international trade center construction project. Days later, a United States district court ruled that Delta Partnership had been chosen in violation of federal contracting guidelines, although the court also refused to overturn the award after finding no bias in the award process. Construction experts decried the decision, saying that the building's costs could balloon to more than $1.2 billion if construction were resumed at a later time.

The decision to cancel the building was reversed on December 2, 1993, by the Clinton administration. Although the building was originally designed to be a major tourist destination and provide a boost to economic development in the downtown area, the building was repurposed to be a simple office building. Rather than a mix of federal and private renters, federal agencies were now scheduled to occupy 80 percent of the office space. By January 1995, the structure was two years behind schedule.

By September 1995, a tentative occupancy date of December 1996 had been set. The building was named for former President Ronald Reagan in October 1995. There were still occasional design glitches. For example, the GSA approved two major sculptures for the Woodrow Wilson Plaza in 1994, abruptly ordered a halt to work on the sculptures in June 1996, and then ordered work to proceed again in July 1996.

Construction slipped further, and by January 1997 occupancy was scheduled for the following summer. Construction continued to fall behind schedule, with completion not expected until summer 1998. Nonetheless, federal officials planned to move more than 480 Environmental Protection Agency employees into the building in July 1997. By this time, security concerns had led to several additional design changes (including a reduction in the number of parking spaces to just 1,900), and the cost of the structure had risen to $738 million.

The Ronald Reagan Building opened on May 5, 1998. President Bill Clinton and former First Lady Nancy Reagan dedicated the building. Three large pieces of artwork were included in the building. The first, by sculptor and D.C. native Stephen Robin, is a gigantic rose with stem and a lily, both made out of cast aluminum and lying on stone pedestals. The second, by African American D.C. native Martin Puryear, is a Minimalist tower of brown welded metal titled "Bearing Witness" which stands in Woodrow Wilson Plaza. The third, located inside the building's atrium, is a multi-story neon installation by Keith Sonnier titled "Route Zenith." The structure's final cost was $818 million.

== Critical assessment ==
"Federal Triangle was the most important government construction project of the 1930s in Washington." It was the largest construction project in the United States in the 1930s; only the construction of Rockefeller Center in New York City came close. It "remains one of the most important design and construction projects" in American history.

The original seven buildings won critical praise for their beauty from the news media when they first opened. The Washington Post said the Internal Revenue building was "a credit to any city" and declared the "marble work to be among the most beautiful in the United States." At its dedication, The New York Times called the Department of Justice building "one of the most beautiful public buildings in the world".

Praise was most heavily lavished on the Commerce building. It was not only the largest office building in the world, but the "greatest of office buildings" and one which represented the aspirations of the nation. It had "dignity without severity", one report said, and was "a magnificent architectural end". It had the "world's most extensive and impressive applications of bronze", "embellished with a wealth of detail, delicately modeled, carefully tooled, finely chased and exactingly finished." Even the interior decorating scheme was highly noted for its "fine architectural effect".

But younger architects in the 1930s criticized the style and size of the buildings at Federal Triangle for being "elitist, pretentious, and anachronistic". Architecture critic William Harlan Hale strongly criticized the Neoclassical style for being unimaginative and anti-democratic: "New Deal indeed! What was there new, or modern, or imaginative, or efficient, or economical in trying to give modern Washington the character of Imperial Rome? What was there either aesthetic or intelligent in cloaking the offices of a modern democracy as the temple of a classic tyrant, the gallery of a Renaissance prince, or the palace of a French monarch? ...we have learned quite a lot about the principles of modern architecture, just as we have learned a lot about some other things; and today, after so short a time, it looks pretty much like a relic out of the dim past." By the 1940s, some critics said the buildings were too reminiscent of Nazi and Soviet architecture.

Initial assessments of the Ronald Reagan Building's design were overwhelmingly positive. Washington Post critic Benjamin Forgey highly praised the Pei Cobb Freed design when it was first made public. Forgey found the final building even more praiseworthy, finding it full of "character and extraordinary potential," "brilliant," "vital," "welcoming," "clever" and "dynamic." Forgey particularly praised the bold stroke of the building's diagonal structure (which extends from the rotunda at the north end of Woodrow Wilson Plaza to the juncture of 13th Street NW and Pennsylvania Avenue NW) and the conical atrium on the building's east side.

Federal employees working in the building gave it "rave reviews" and at its dedication was one of the most sought-after places to work in the city. But six months later, another Washington Post reporter declared the Ronald Reagan building "much too large," "confusing" to get around in, "awkwardly configured," and with "dismal views". The facade, the critic felt, was "relentlessly austere" and represented "a lost opportunity to lighten the Federal Triangle's imperial, ponderous architectural spirit".

== Current buildings ==
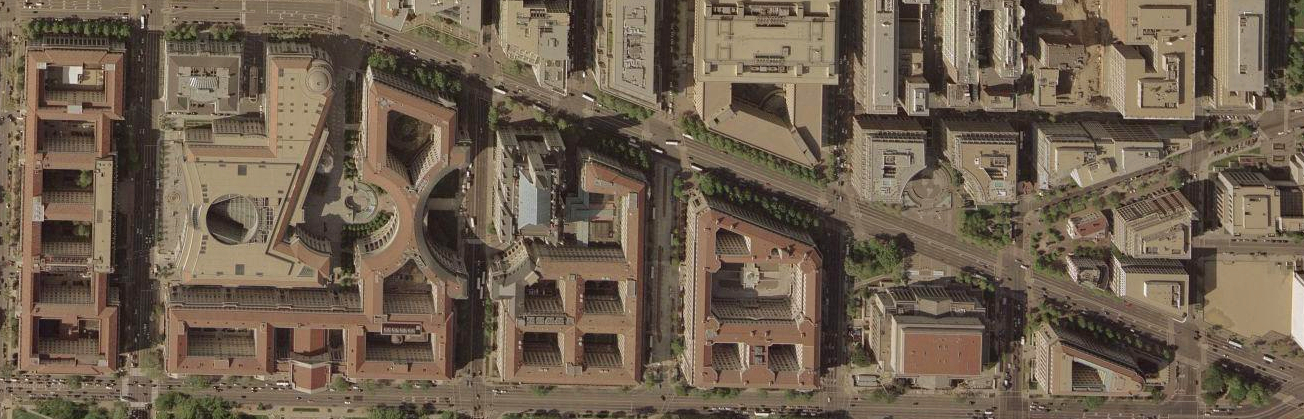
An aerial view of Federal Triangle in 2002

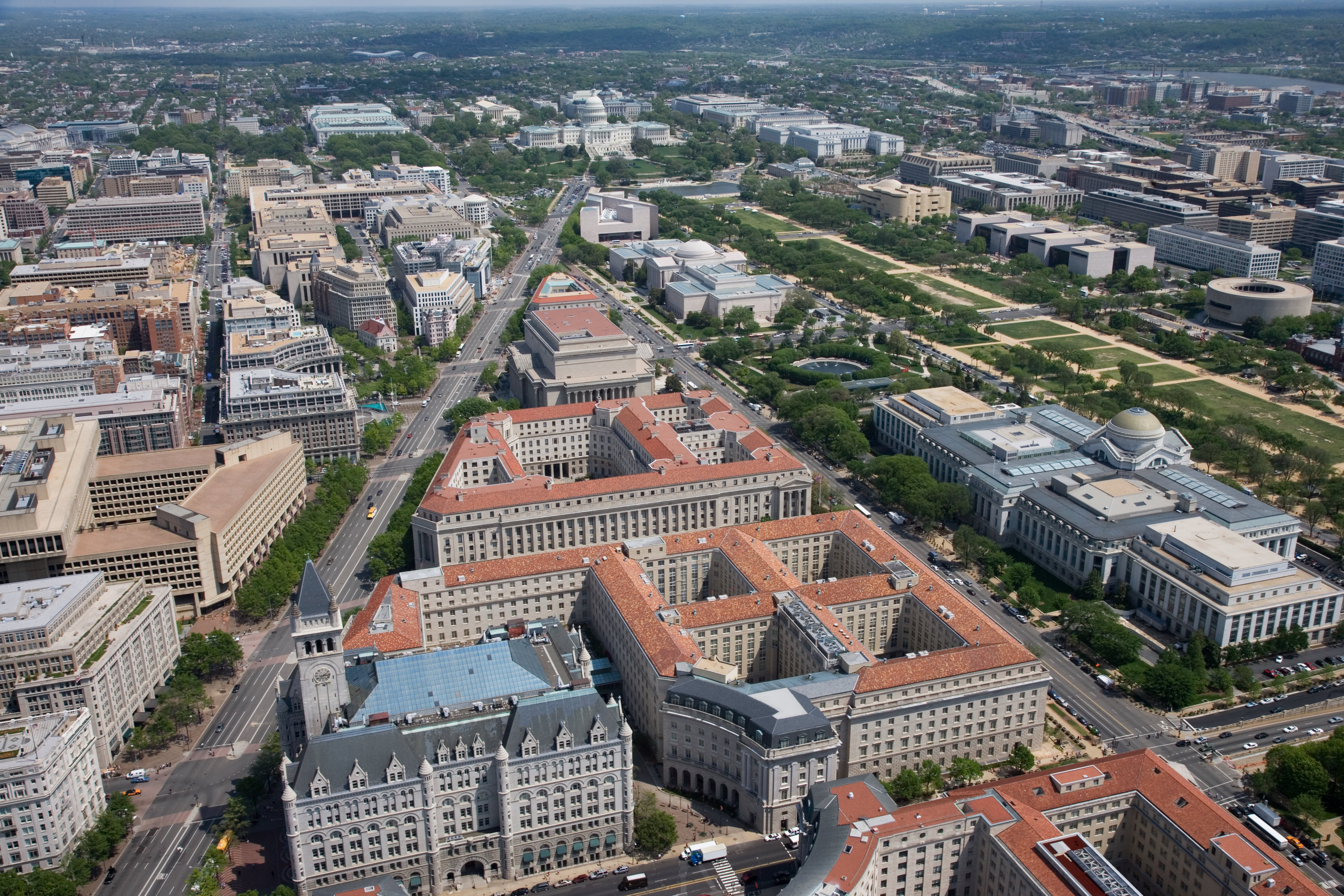
Federal Triangle facing east in 2006

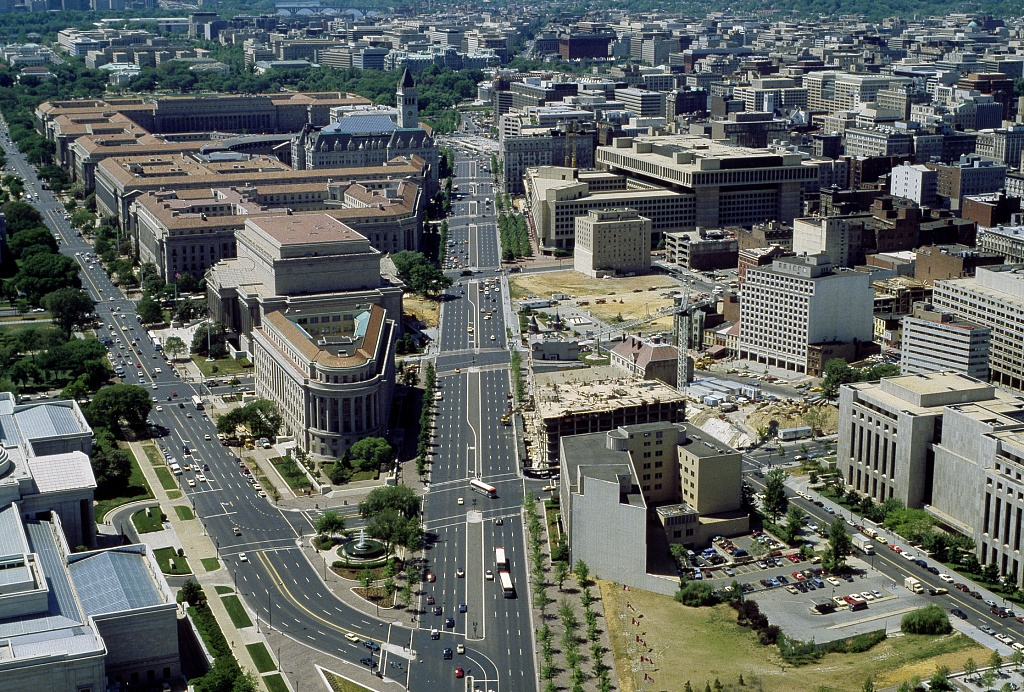
Federal Triangle facing west in the late 1980s

As of 2009, Federal Triangle included two existing buildings and eight buildings built specifically for the development. The structures include:

- Apex Building, which houses the Federal Trade Commission
- William Jefferson Clinton Federal Building, originally the Post Office Department Building but renamed in 1982 for Ariel Rios and renamed again for Bill Clinton in 2013, which houses the Environmental Protection Agency
- Department of Labor/Interstate Commerce Commission building, which now houses the Environmental Protection Agency
- Herbert C. Hoover Building, the headquarters of the U.S. Department of Commerce, the White House Visitor Center, and formerly the National Aquarium
- Internal Revenue Service Building, the headquarters of the Internal Revenue Service
- John A. Wilson Building, houses the offices and chambers of the District Council and the Mayor of Washington, D.C.
- National Archives Building
- Old Post Office, houses the Waldorf Astoria Washington DC hotel
- Robert F. Kennedy Department of Justice Building, the headquarters of the U.S. Department of Justice
- Ronald Reagan Building and International Trade Center, which houses both private-sector and government offices, including headquarters for the U.S. Agency for International Development and U.S. Customs and Border Protection

These buildings are contributing structures to the Pennsylvania Avenue National Historic Site.

== See also ==
- Architecture of Washington, D.C.
