= Solitude Farm =

Historic house in Pennsylvania, United States

- U.S. National Register of Historic Places
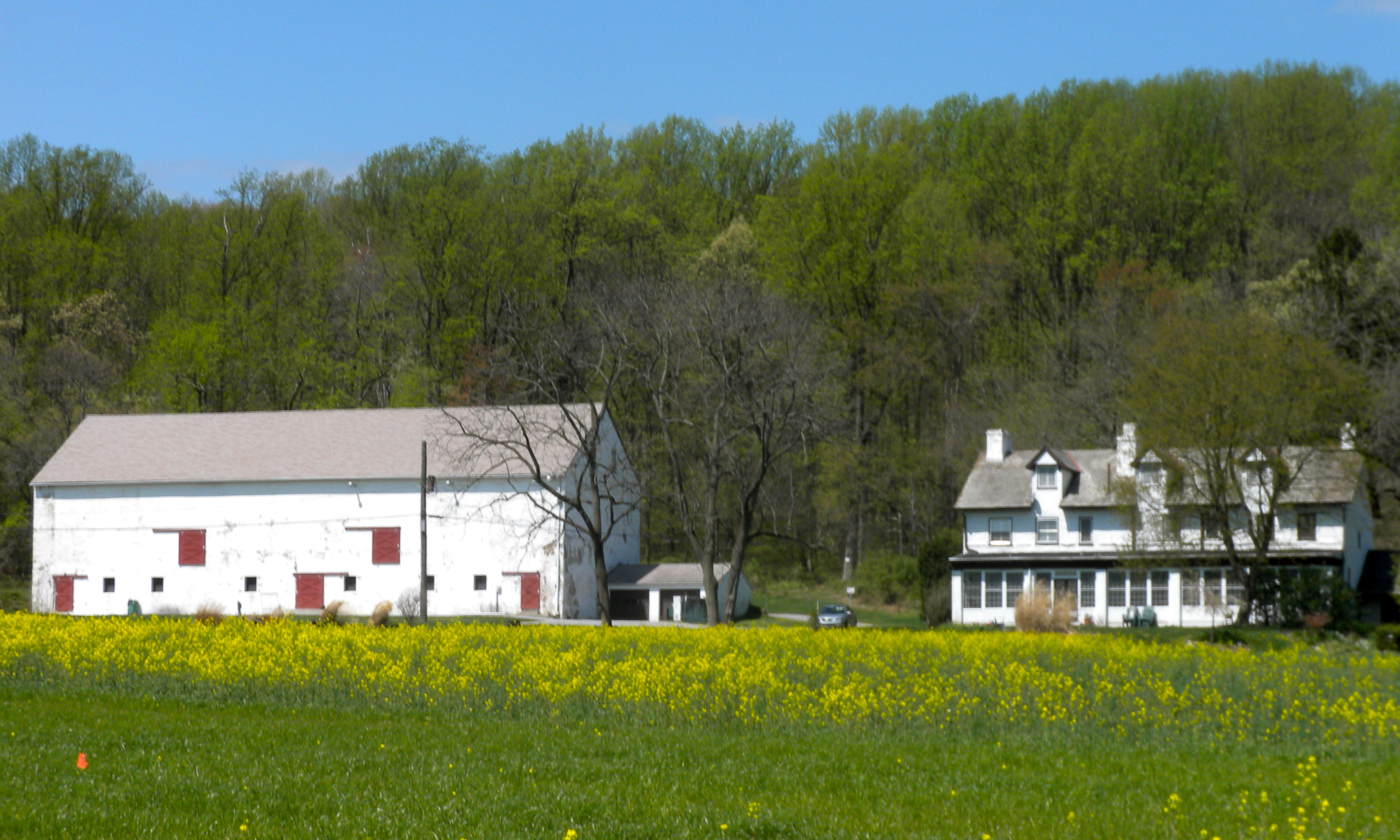
- Solitude Farm, April 2010

- Location within Pennsylvania Location within the United States
- Location: Church Farm Rd., West Whiteland Township, Pennsylvania
- Coordinates: 40°2′53″N 75°36′11″W
- Area: 9.6 acres (3.9 ha)
- Built: c. 1750, 1761, 1904
- Architect: Medary, Milton
- Architectural style: Colonial, Georgian
- MPS: West Whiteland Township MRA
- NRHP reference No.: 84003303
- Added to NRHP: August 2, 1984

The Solitude Farm is an historic home that is located in West Whiteland Township, Chester County, Pennsylvania, United States.

It was listed on the National Register of Historic Places in 1984.

== History and architectural features ==
The original house was built in two sections circa 1750 and in 1761. The original section is a two-story, rectangular, stuccoed stone structure with a kitchen wing. In 1904, Philadelphia architect Milton Bennett Medary (1874–1929) rehabilitated the house to add diamond-paned dormer windows and a porch. Also located on the property are a contributing stone barn, garage, and outbuildings.
