= Milton Bennett Medary =

American architect (1874–1929)

- Medary c. 1927
- Born: Milton Bennett Medary; February 6, 1864
- Died: August 7, 1929 (aged 65)

Milton Bennett Medary Jr. (February 6, 1874 – August 7, 1929) was an American architect from Philadelphia, practicing with the firm Zantzinger, Borie and Medary from 1910 until his death.

== Biography ==
Medary attended the University of Pennsylvania for one year before joining the Philadelphia architecture firm of Frank Miles Day in 1891. While at the university, he entered a student competition and designed, (with Frank Miles Day and William C. Hays), the 1894 student union, Houston Hall. Credit for this design, however, was given to a faculty member, Frank Miles Day with Medary listed as an associate architect.

Medary remained with Frank Miles Day until 1894, when he founded his own firm in Philadelphia, Field & Medary. That firm would become Zantzinger, Borie & Medary in 1910. He was employed in 1904 to rehabilitate Solitude Farm in West Whiteland Township, Pennsylvania.

Medary began design work in 1908 on the Washington Memorial Chapel in Valley Forge, Pennsylvania. Its exterior was completed in 1917 and its interior in 1921, under Zantzinger, Borie & Medary. He designed the Fiske Portal (1922–23), a new doorway for St. Mark's Episcopal Church in Philadelphia. Sculptor and cabinetmaker Edward Maene, metalworker Samuel Yellin, and stained glass designer Nicola D'Ascenzo collaborated on the doors and the polychromed "Christ in Majesty" tableau above them. His firm designed the Fidelity Mutual Life Insurance Company Building (1926–28) in Philadelphia (now an annex of the Philadelphia Museum of Art), and the Bok Singing Tower (1927–29), in Lake Wales, Florida.

Medary was a design consultant to several universities, the Theodore Roosevelt Memorial Association, and Mount Vernon. His buildings include the Pennsylvania Athletic Club, Bryn Mawr Hospital, and, with Paul Cret, the Detroit Institute of Arts. Medary served as chairman of the United States Department of Labor's Housing Corporation during World War I and was selected in 1927 by Secretary of the Treasury Andrew Mellon to serve on the Board of Architectural Consultants, which advised the department on the design of the Federal Triangle development.

Medary served on the National Capital Park and Planning Commission and on the U.S. Commission of Fine Arts in Washington, D.C.; he was president of both the American Institute of Architects (AIA) and its Philadelphia chapter, a Fellow of the American Institute of Architects, and was affiliated with the Foundation for Architecture and Landscape Architecture and with the Pennsylvania Academy of Fine Arts. Medary was honored by the AIA with a gold medal in 1929 and by the Art Club of Philadelphia with a gold medal in 1927, and was awarded an honorary doctorate by the University of Pennsylvania in 1927.

== Death ==
He died in 1929 of heart failure. With him was his wife, Hannah, and daughter Rachael. His sons, Richard Medary and Milton Bennett Medary III, then students at the University of Pennsylvania were traveling in Europe. Another daughter, Mrs. William Norris, lived in Rio de Janeiro.

== Gallery ==
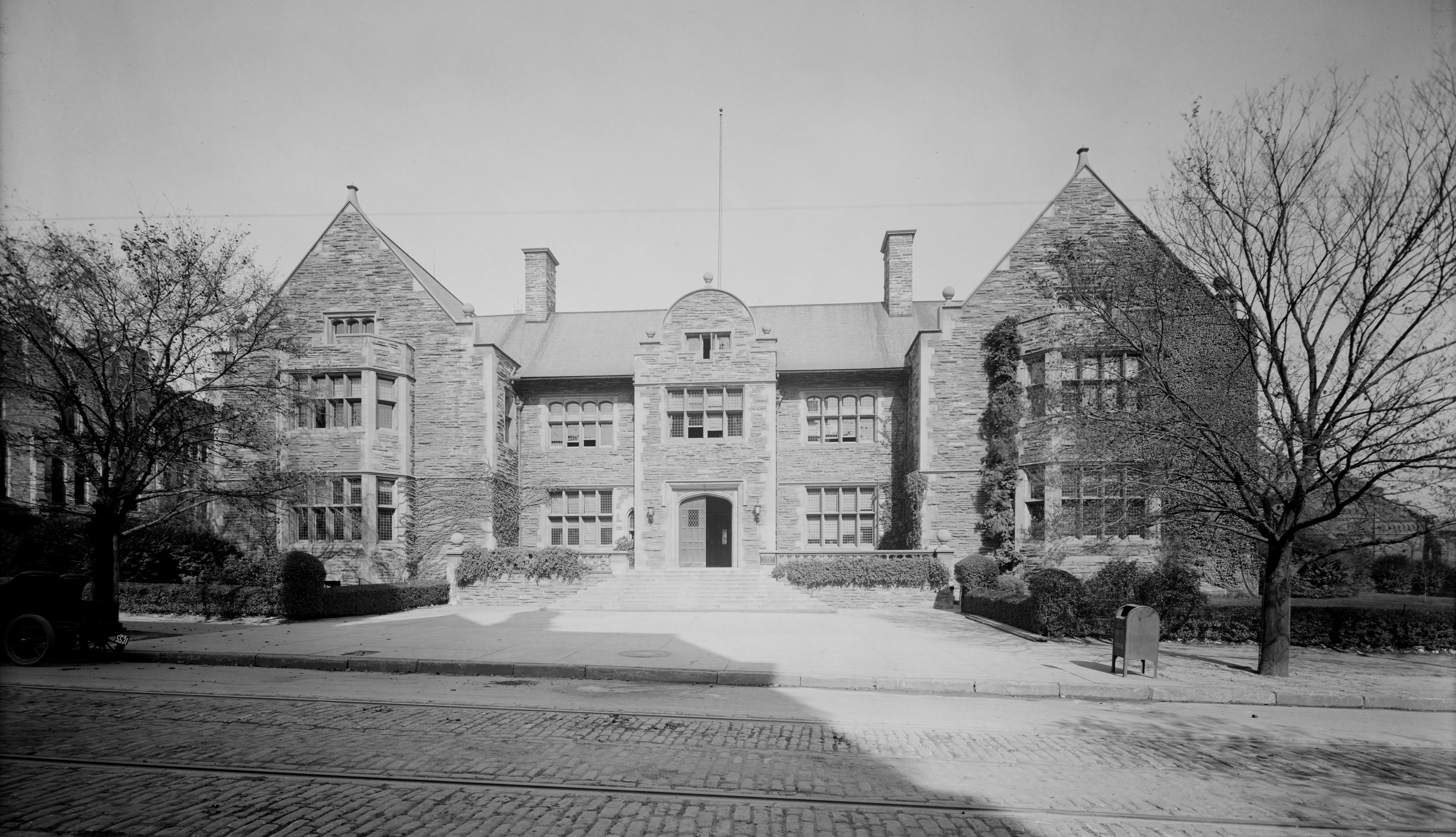
Houston Hall (1894–96), University of Pennsylvania, Philadelphia

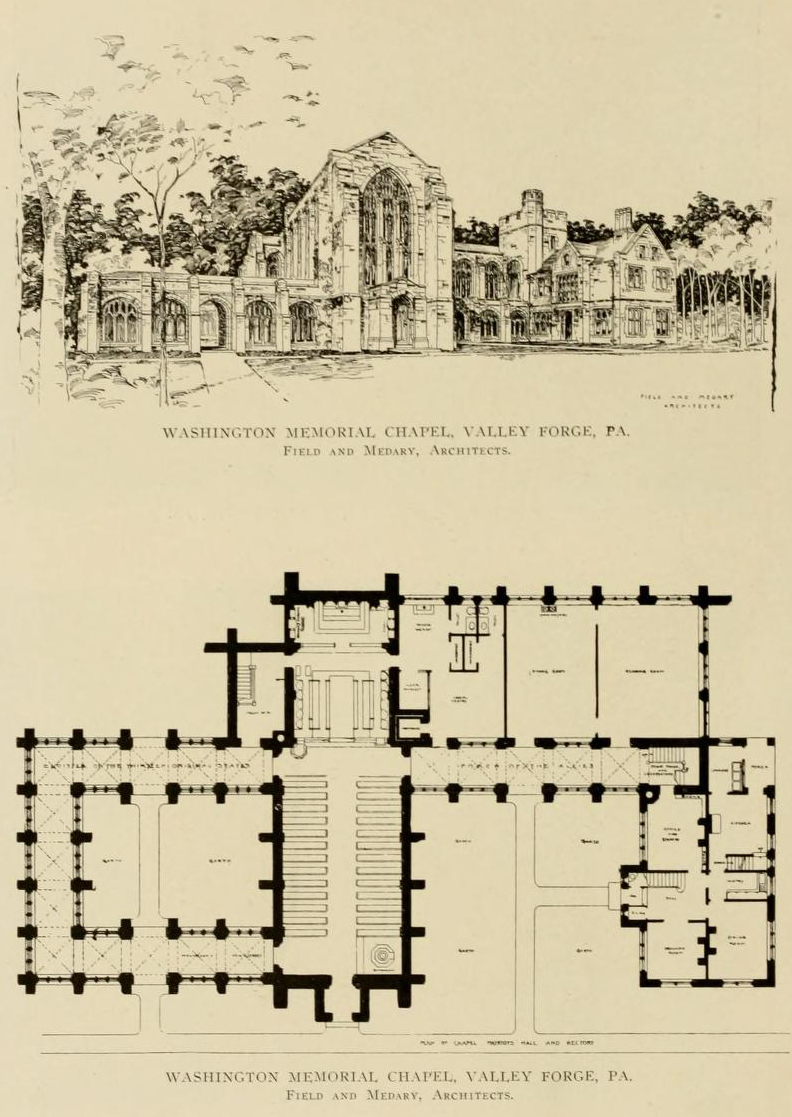
Perspective & plan of Washington Memorial Chapel (1908), Valley Forge, Pennsylvania

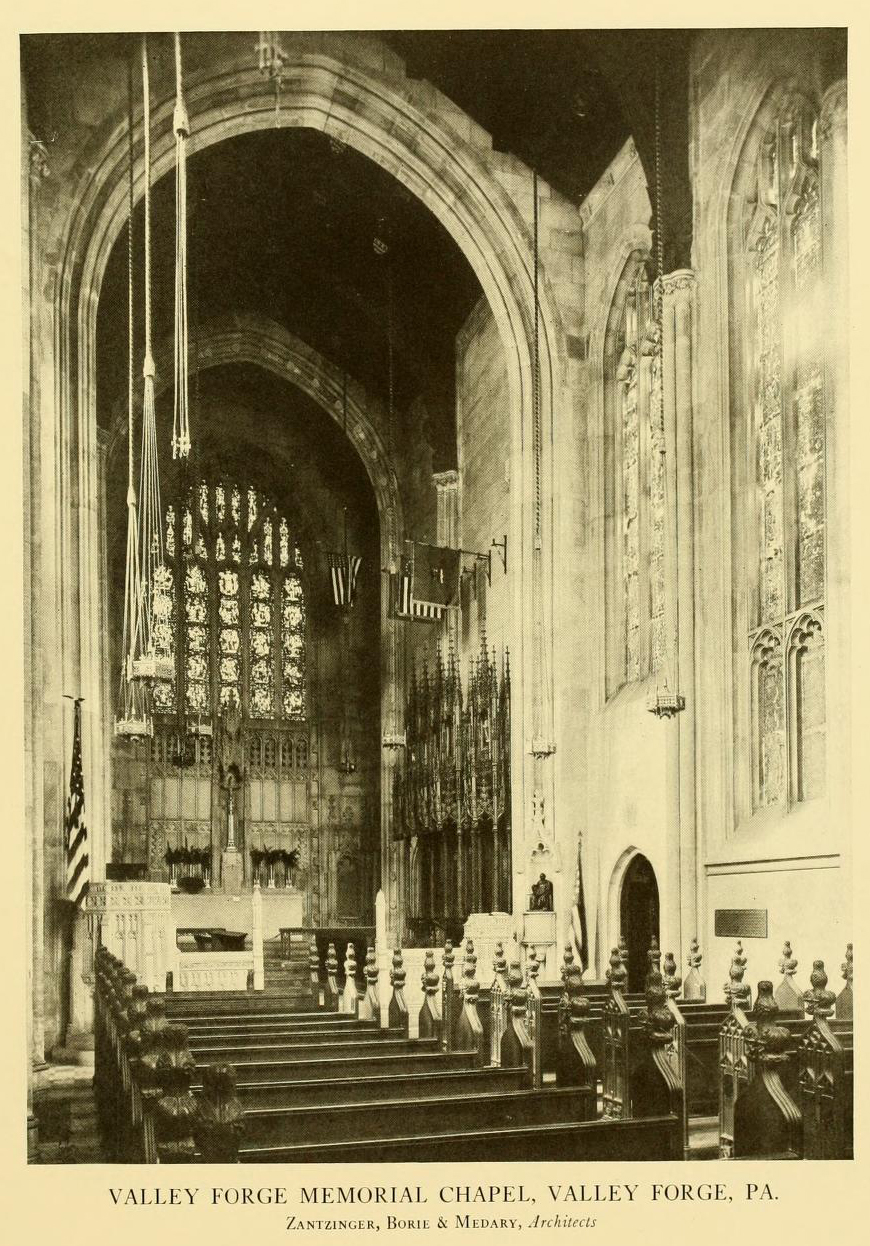
Washington Memorial Chapel, interior completed 1921.

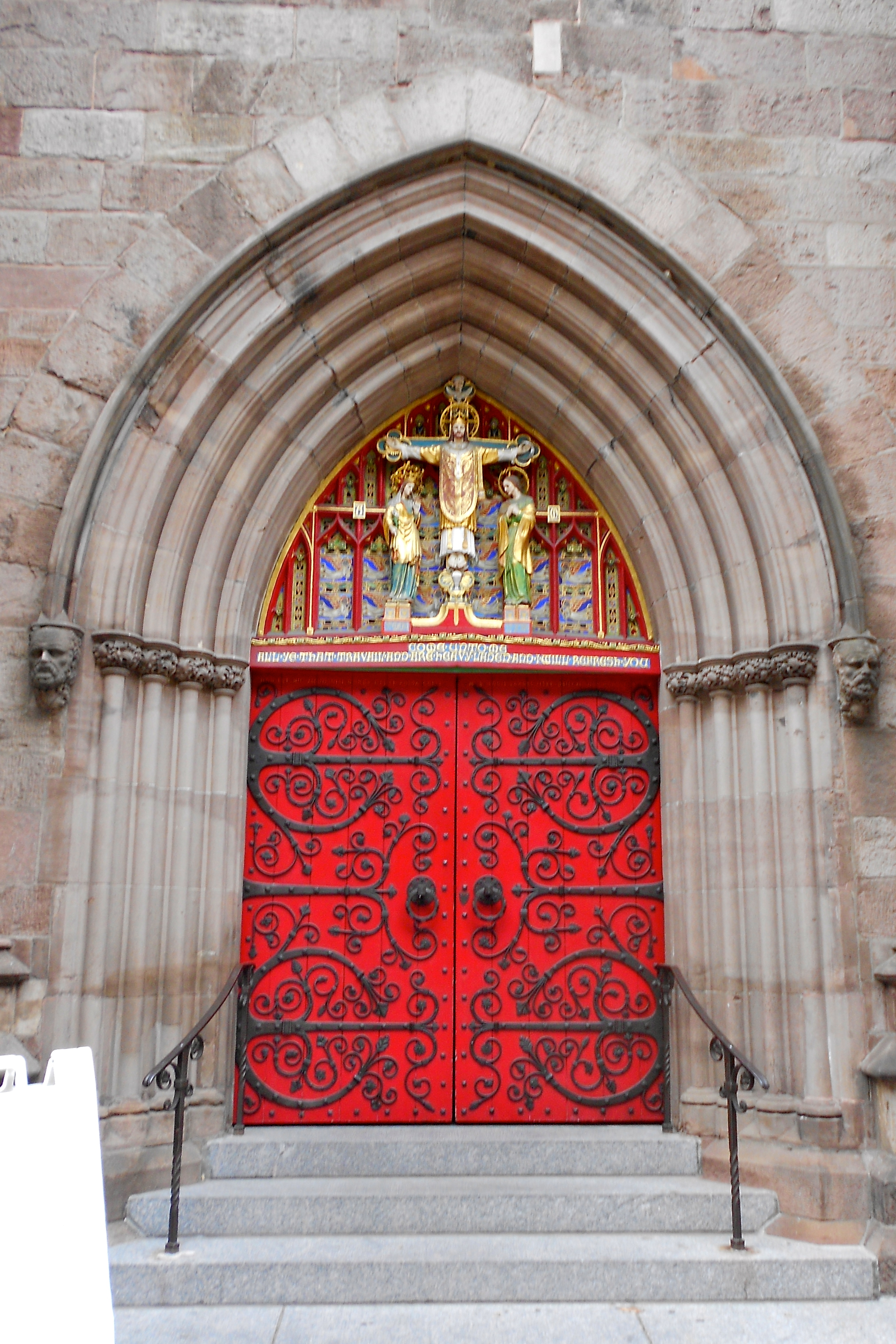
Fiske Portal (1922–23), St. Mark's Episcopal Church, Philadelphia

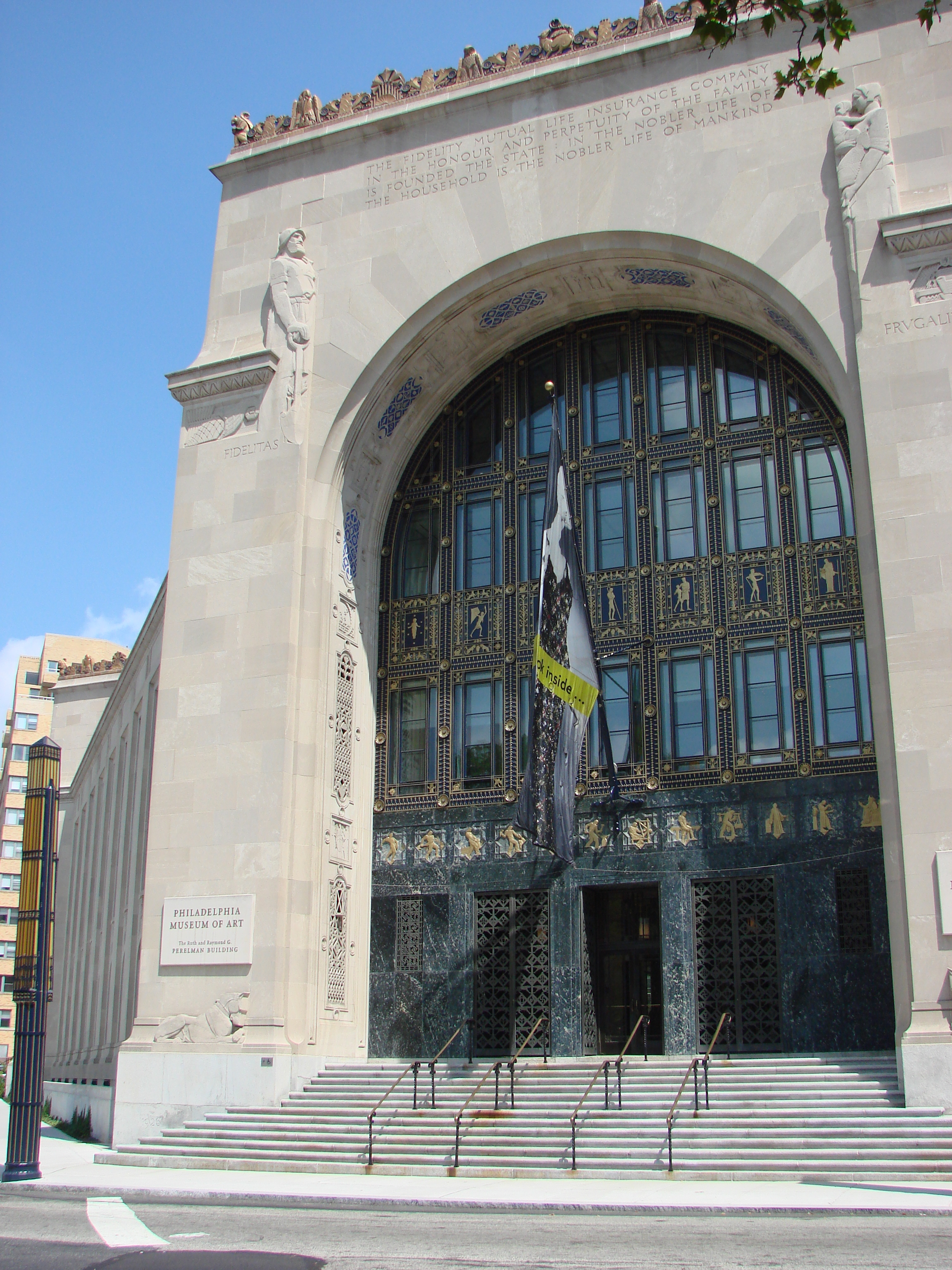
Fidelity Mutual Life Insurance Company Building (1926–28), Philadelphia.

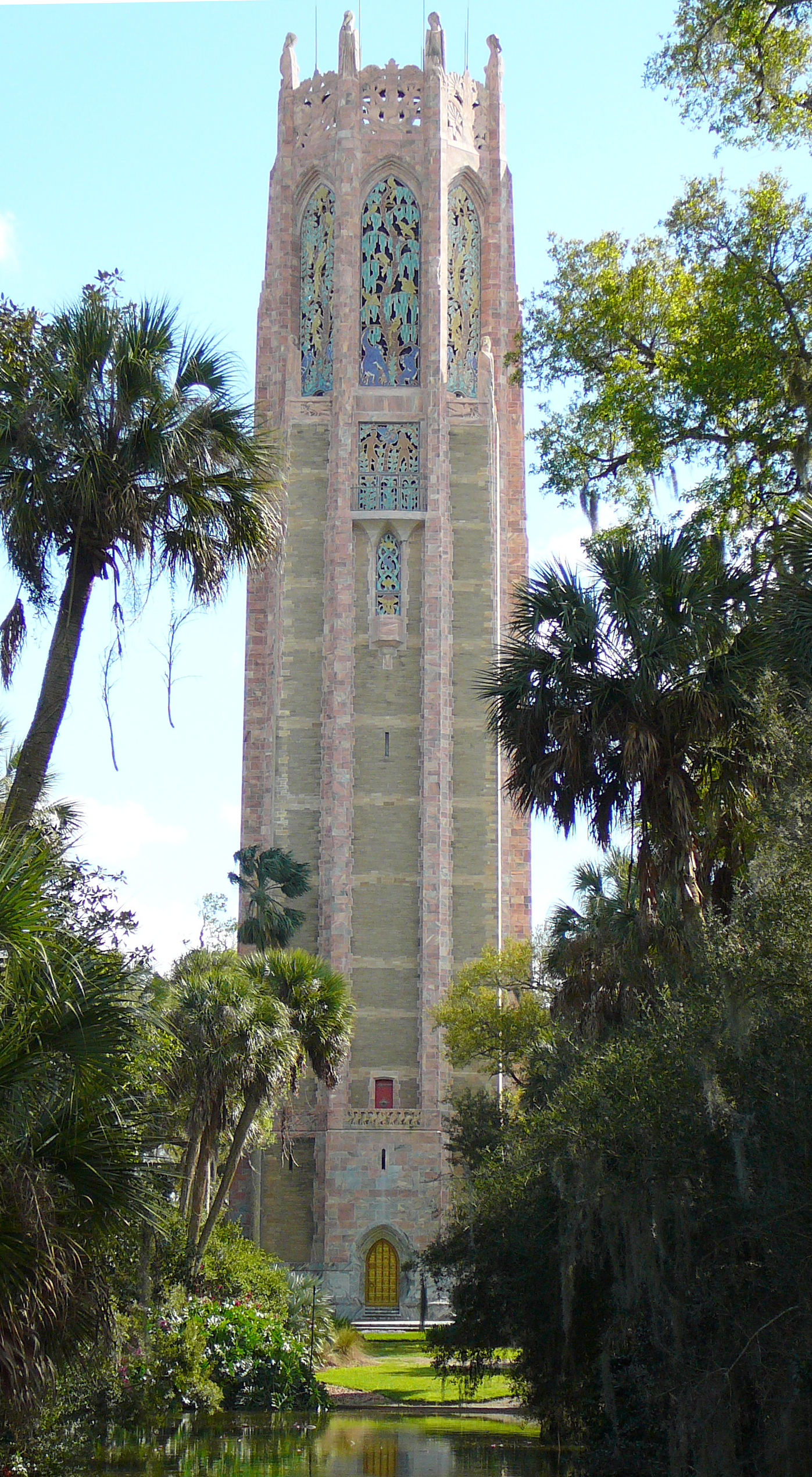
Bok Singing Tower (1927–29), Lake Wales, Florida
