= Andrew W. Mellon Auditorium =

Neoclassical auditorium in Washington, D.C., US

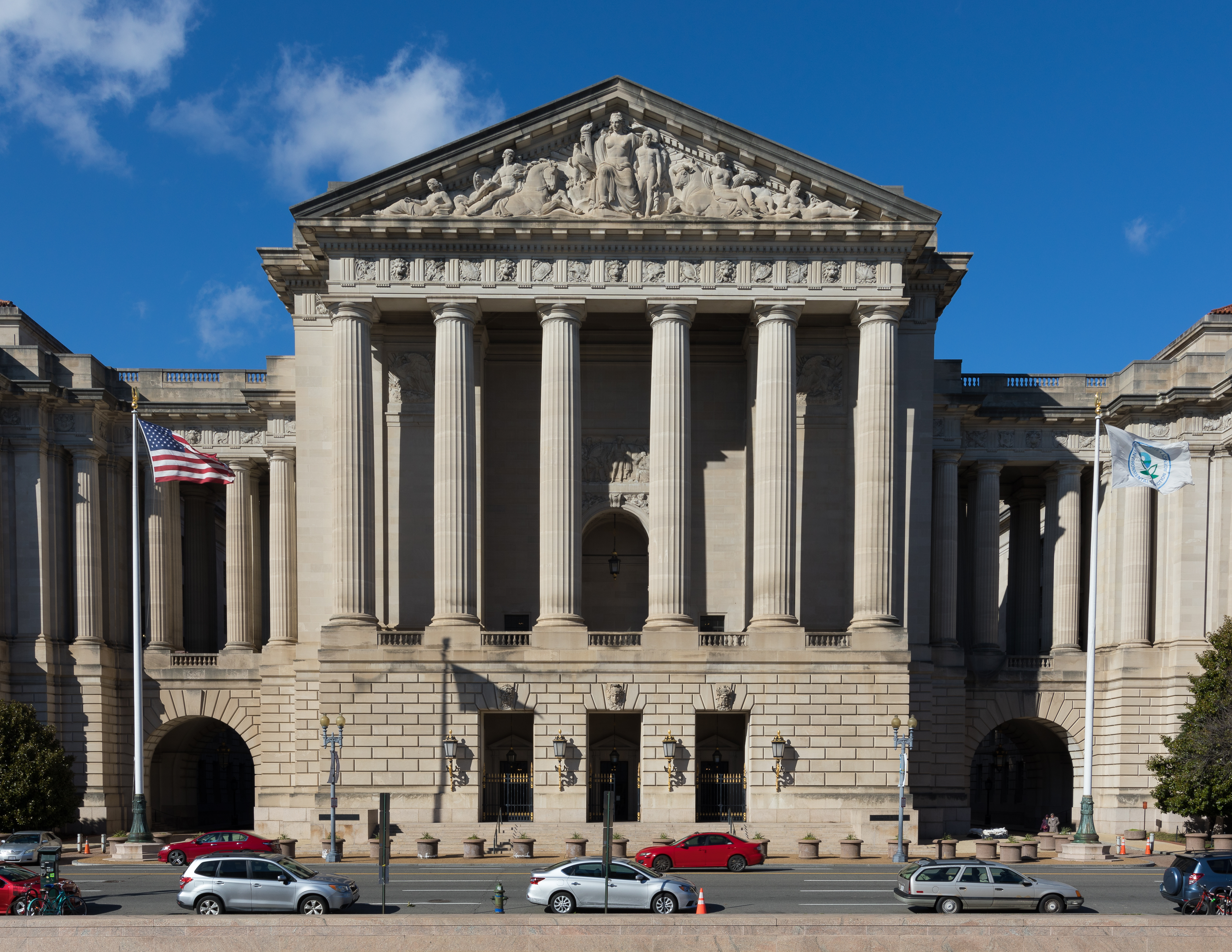
- Facade of the Andrew W. Mellon Auditorium in 2020

- Location within Central Washington, D.C.
- Former names: Departmental Auditorium
- Address: 14th Street, and Constitution Avenue, NW; Washington, D.C. United States
- Coordinates: 38°53′33.4″N 77°1′46.91″W
- Owner: General Services Administration
- Operator: Ridgewells Catering
- Capacity: 1,000
- Type: Auditorium
- Public transit: Federal Triangle station

Construction
- Built: 1934; 92 years ago
- Opened: February 25, 1935; 91 years ago
- Rebuilt: 2000
- Architect: Arthur Brown, Jr.

Website
- eventsatmellon.com
- Andrew W. Mellon Auditorium
- U.S. Historic district – Contributing property
- Architectural style: Classical Revival
- Part of: Pennsylvania Avenue National Historic Site (ID66000865)

The Andrew W. Mellon Auditorium (originally named the Departmental Auditorium) is a 750-seat historic Neoclassical auditorium located at 1301 Constitution Avenue NW in Washington, D.C. The auditorium, which connects two wings of the William Jefferson Clinton Federal Building, is owned by the U.S. government but available for use by the public.

== Description ==
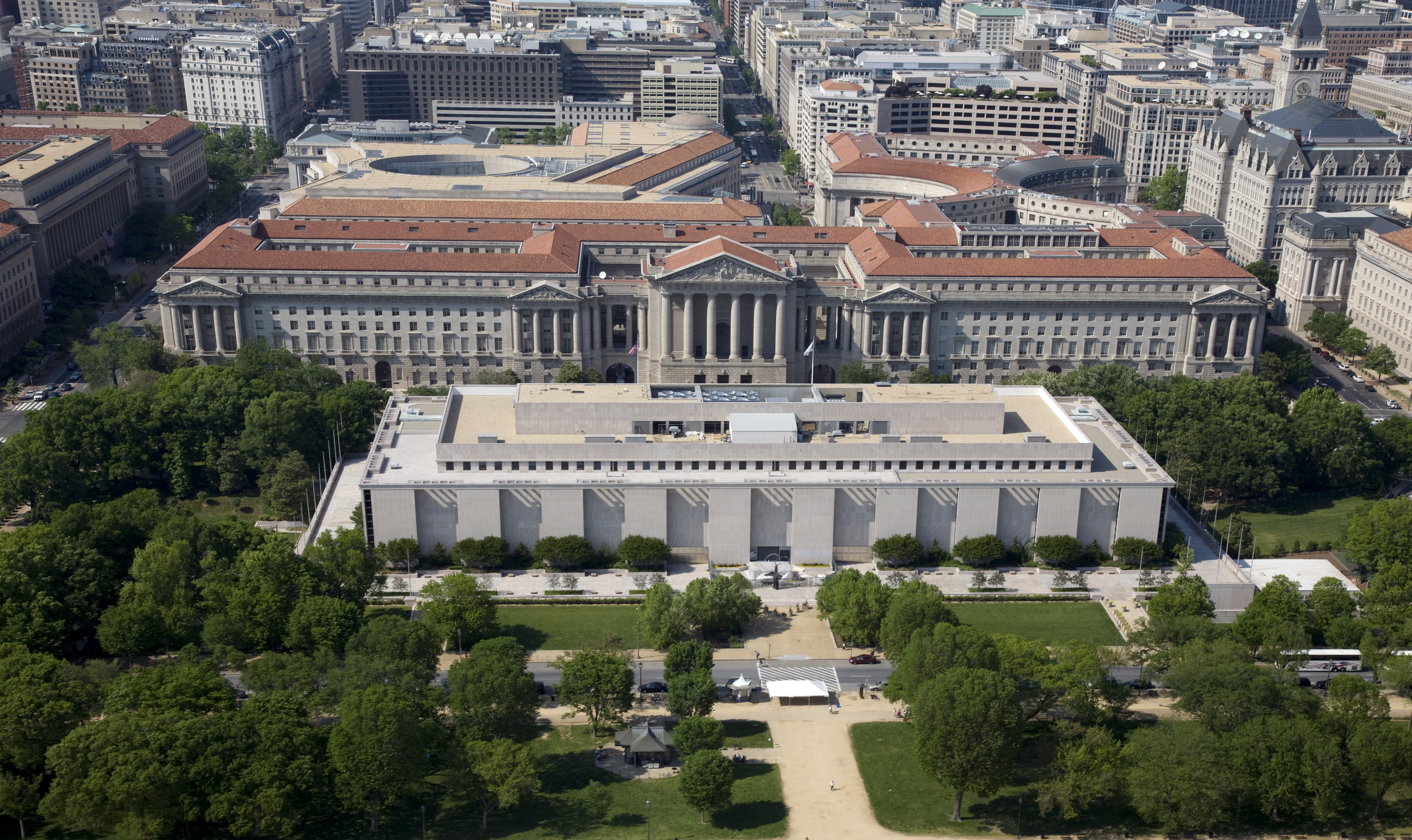
Aerial view of the Andrew W. Mellon Auditorium, among other buildings, in the Federal Triangle. The National Museum of American History is in the foreground.

San Francisco-based American architect Arthur Brown, Jr. designed the auditorium as well as the two buildings adjacent to it. The architectural style of the building is Neoclassical, as are all the buildings in the Federal Triangle development. The portico of the Auditorium provides the motif for the two buildings which are on either side of it. Six Doric columns form the auditorium's portico. Over the portico is a pediment titled "Columbia", by Edgar Walter. The sculpture on the pediment depicts Columbia (the feminine personification of the United States) seated on a throne-like chair, an eagle on her right, a nude youth on her left, and the rays of the sun spreading out behind her. Behind the portico, a second pediment sits over an archway which leads to the colonnade. This sculpture, by Edmond Romulus Amateis, depicts George Washington at the Battle of Trenton. The interior is in the Beaux Arts style. The interior lighting was designed by Brown, and consists of brass and aluminum chandeliers overhead and aluminum and gold leaf bracket lamps on the walls. The ceiling was originally painted blue.

Colonnades link the auditorium to the buildings to the east and west, and galleries in the Auditorium's rear provide interior passages to these buildings as well. The galleries have received much praise. One critic noted, "The open galleries linking the auditorium to its neighbors constitute one of the greatest passages in American architecture."

The entire structure has been called "one of the most magnificent auditoriums in the country".

== Construction ==
The building was constructed as part of the Federal Triangle development. Although plans to redevelop the slum Murder Bay had existed for decades, Congress did not fund the purchase of land or construction of buildings in the area until 1926. In July 1926, the government proposed building a Department of Labor Building between 13th and 14th Streets NW on the north side of B Street NW (now Constitution Avenue NW). In March 1927, the government proposed adding a second building to the east (between 12th and 13th Streets NW) for "Independent Offices" (the building's purpose was later changed to be the headquarters of the Interstate Commerce Commission, or ICC). Design work proceeded slowly. In April 1930, President Herbert Hoover proposed building a $2 million "Departmental Auditorium" to connect the Labor and ICC buildings.

President Hoover laid the cornerstones for the Labor/ICC building on December 15, 1932. Freemasons trained in masonry assisted the President in laying the cornerstones. Hoover personally oversaw the dedication of the cornerstone at the Labor end of the building. His words were broadcast over loudspeaker to the workers at the ICC end of the structure, who placed the ICC cornerstone simultaneously at the President's instruction (becoming the first time in Washington history that a single person dedicated two cornerstones at the same time). William Green, President of the American Federation of Labor (AFL), attended the laying of the cornerstone for the Labor building.

The Labor/ICC building and Departmental Auditorium were dedicated on February 25, 1935. Secretary of Labor Frances Perkins dedicated the $4.5 million Labor building at a ceremony attended by AFL President Green. The ICC portion of the structure cost $4.45 million. The dedications occurred in the Auditorium, and constituted the first event ever held there.

== History ==
Several important events in American and world history have occurred in the Mellon Auditorium. President Franklin D. Roosevelt announced the re-institution of conscription in 1940 from the Auditorium stage. The signing of the North Atlantic Treaty that established NATO occurred in the Auditorium on April 4, 1949. President Bill Clinton signed the North American Free Trade Agreement there in 1994. The 9/11 Commission released its findings in the Auditorium in 2004. Much of the 2020 Republican National Convention took place in the Auditorium.

The U.S. Environmental Protection Agency took occupancy of the Labor/ICC building in 2002, and the complex was renamed the William J. Clinton Federal Building in 2013. The Departmental Auditorium was renamed the Andrew W. Mellon Auditorium in 1987 to honor Secretary of the Treasury Andrew W. Mellon, who oversaw the development of the Federal Triangle construction project and plans for the Departmental Auditorium.

The Mellon Auditorium was listed in the National Register of Historic Places as a contributing property to the Pennsylvania Avenue National Historic Site in 1966. It was renovated and restored in 2000.

== Gallery ==
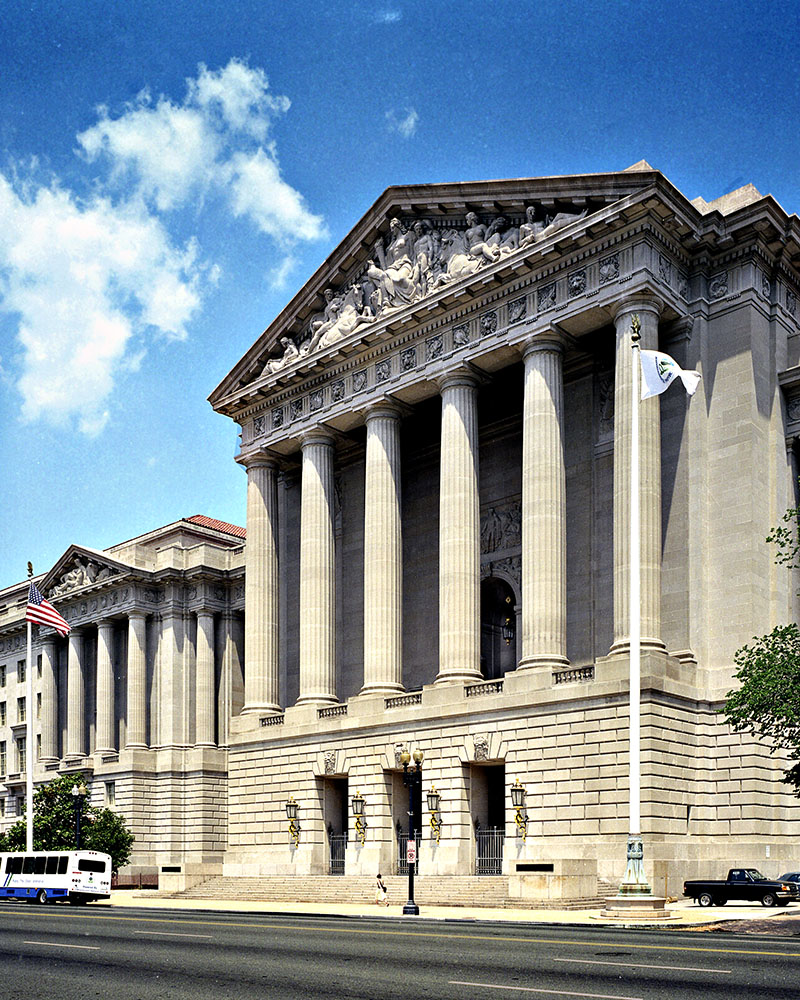
Front entrance on Constitution Avenue Looking NW

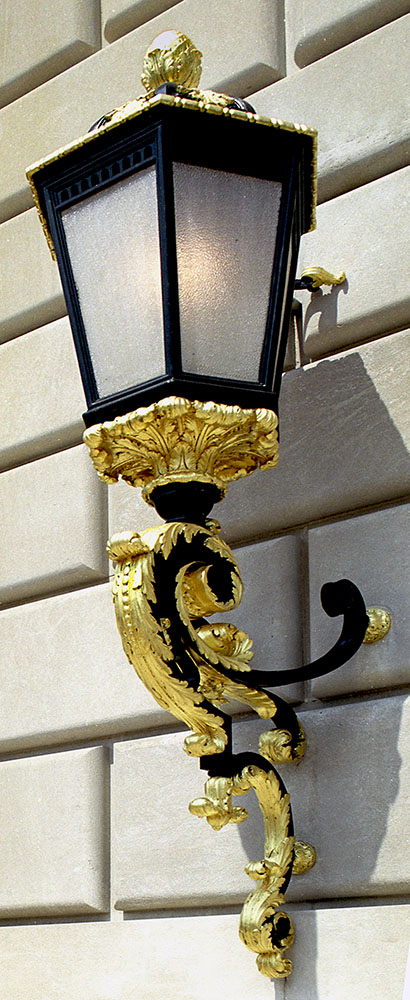
Lantern on the façade

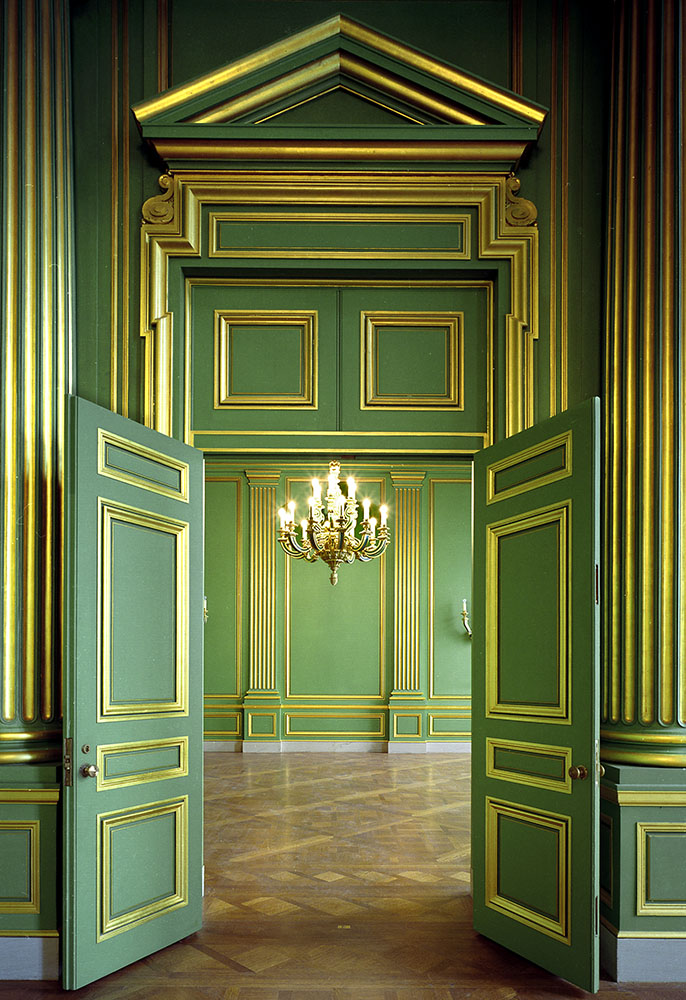
Looking at a side doorway and reception room

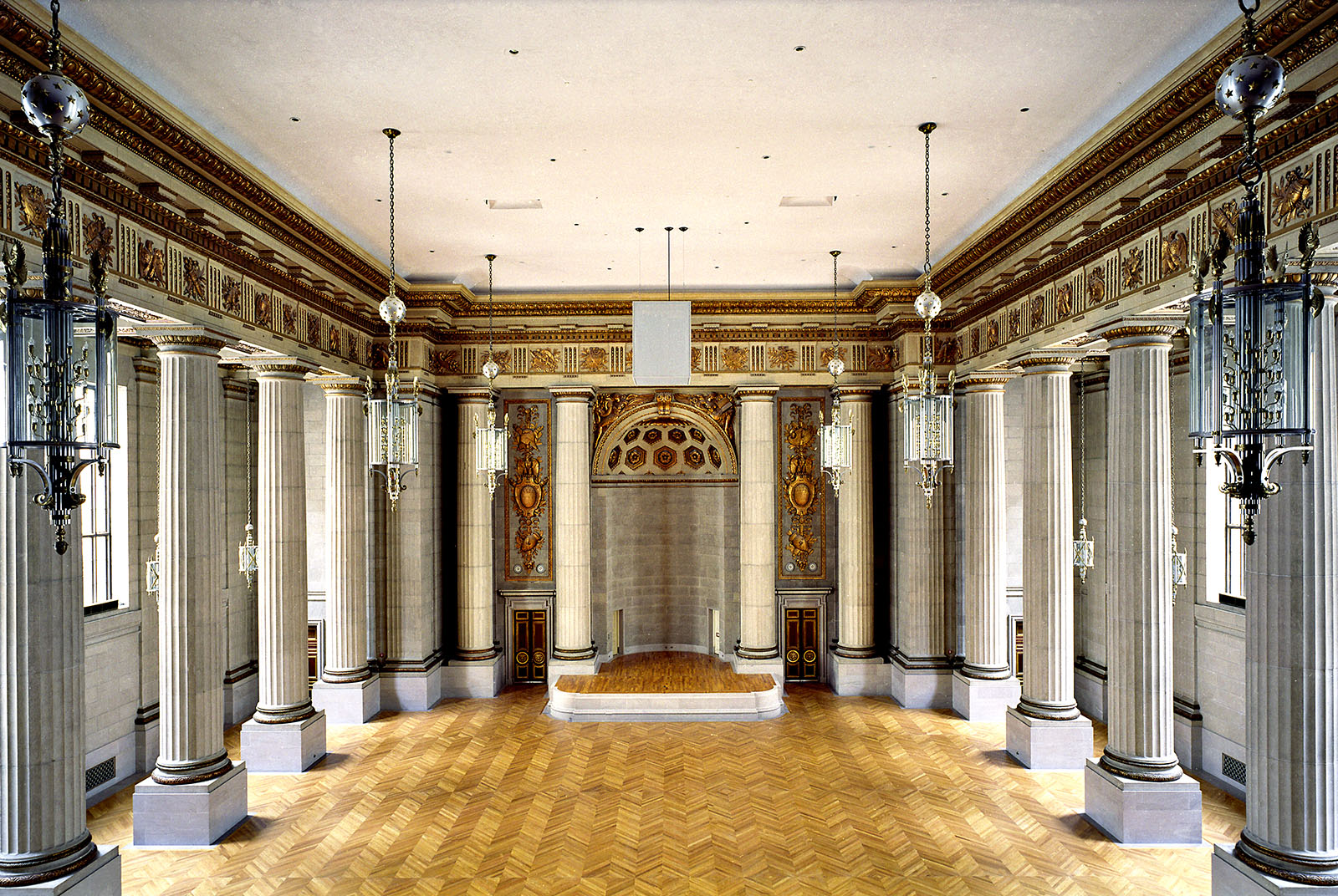
Looking at the stage and auditorium from the rear balcony

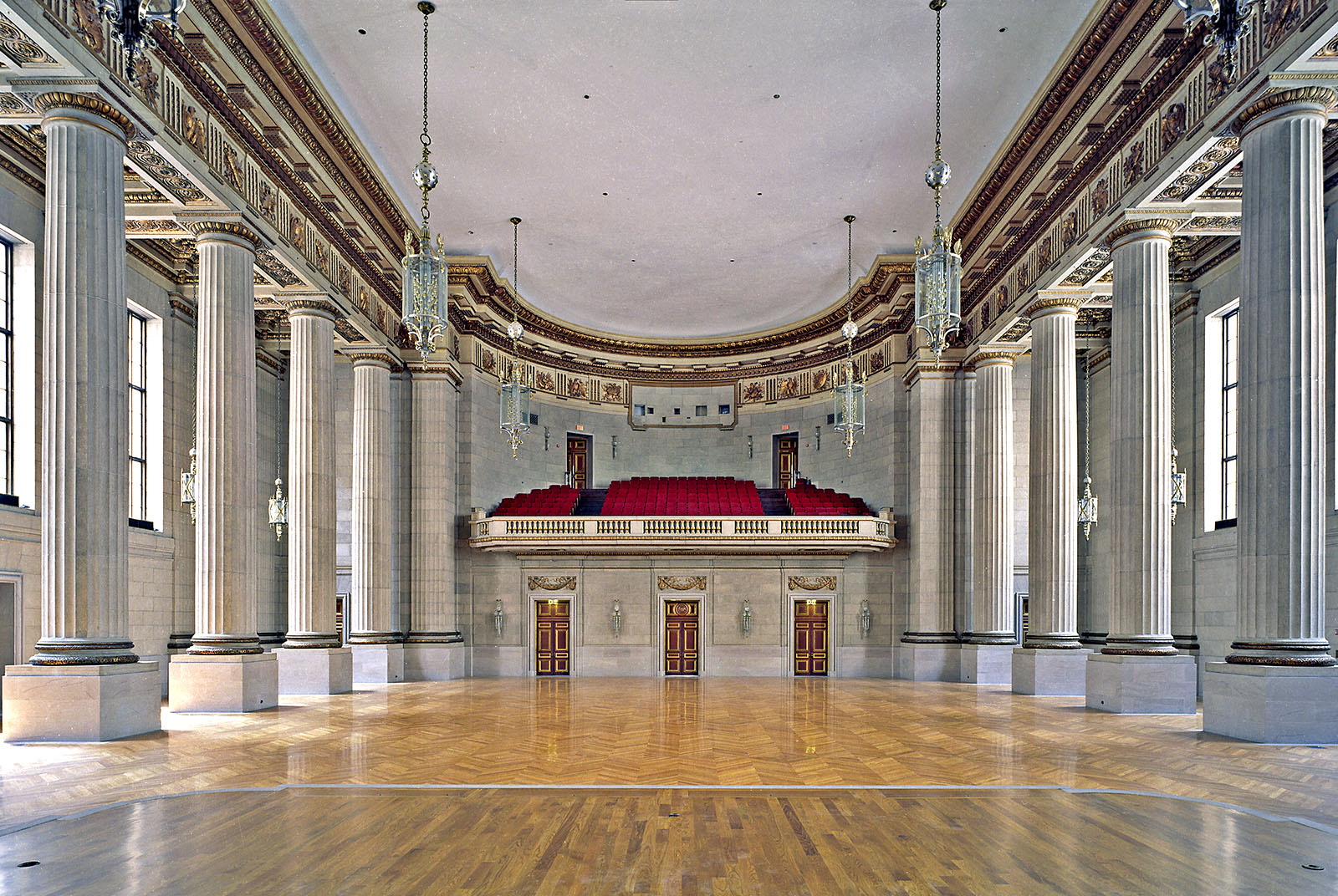
Looking at the entrance to the auditorium from the stage

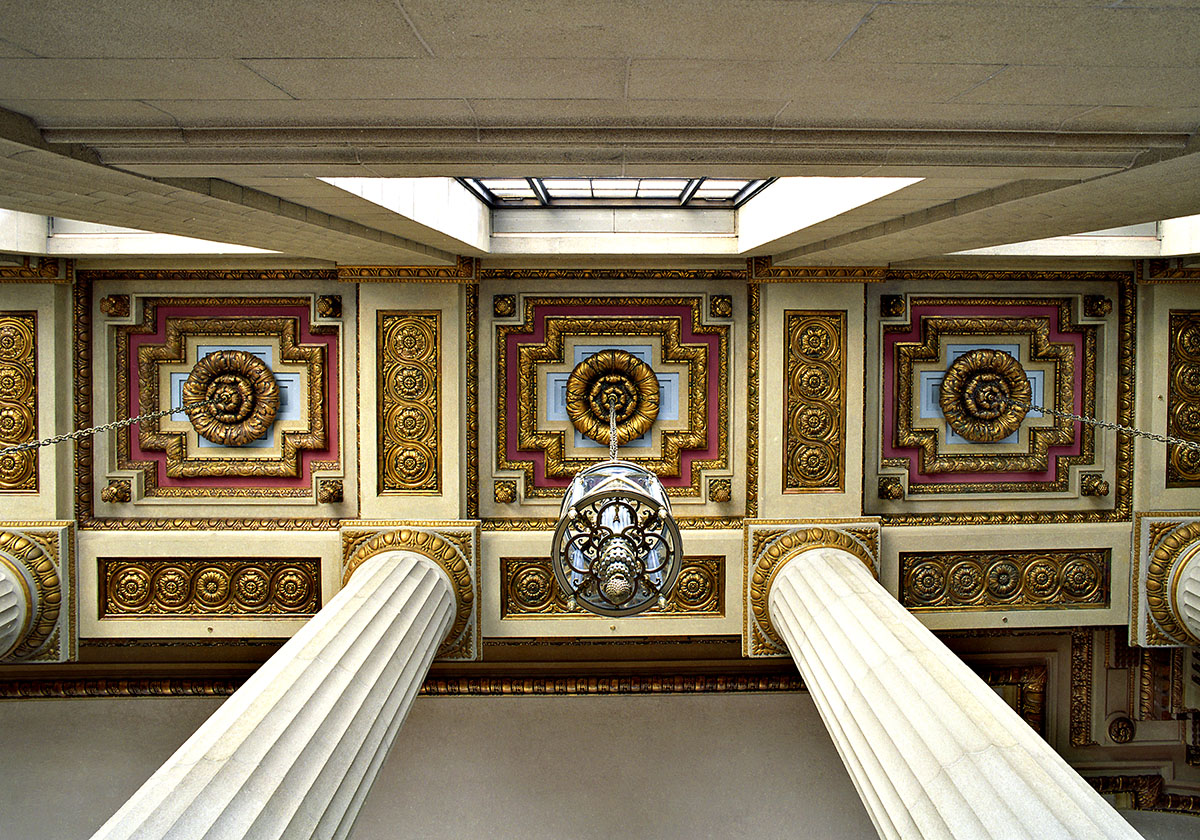
Looking up at the decorated ceiling at the side of the auditorium

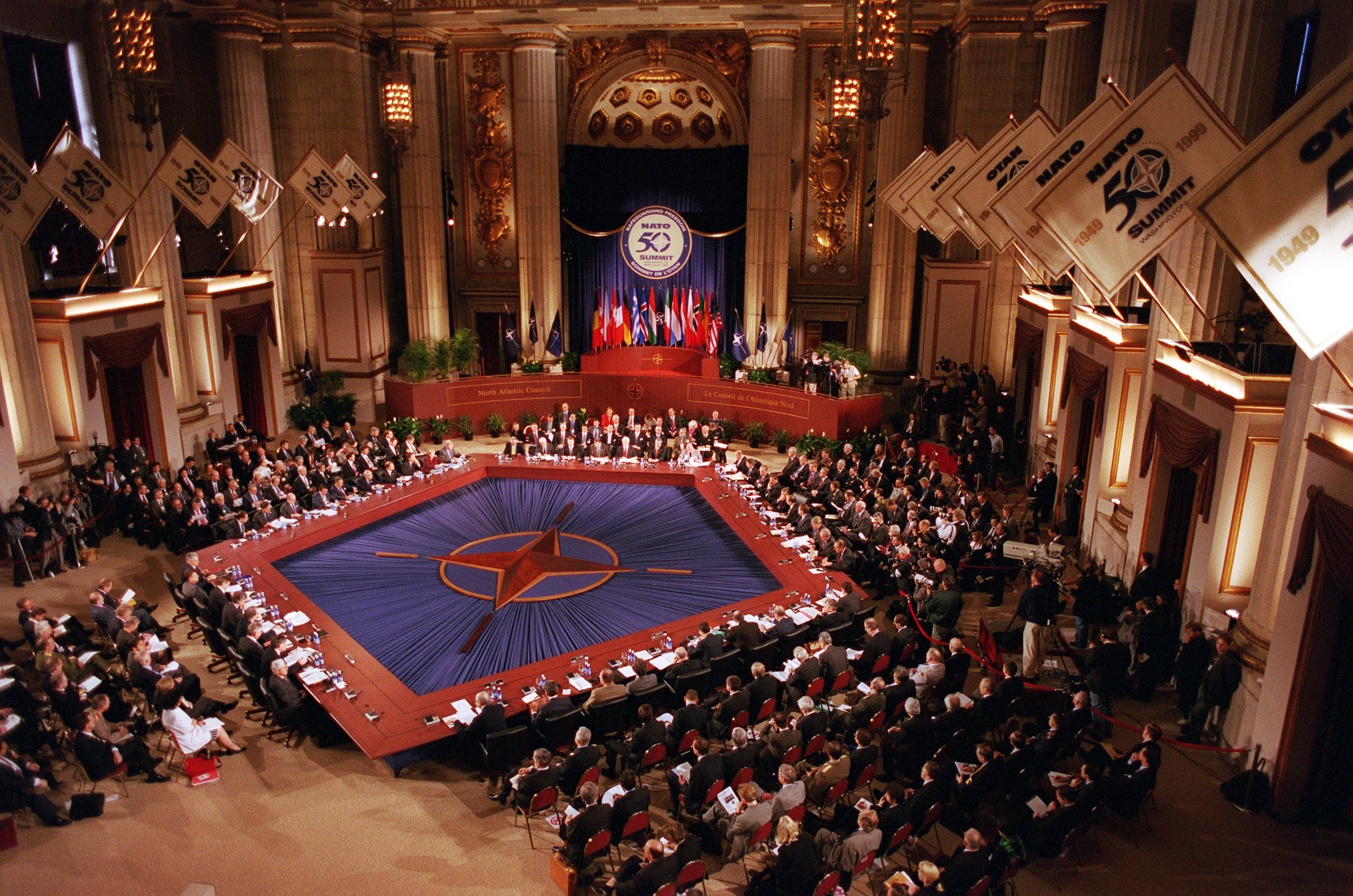
The North Atlantic Council convening in the Mellon Auditorium in 1999

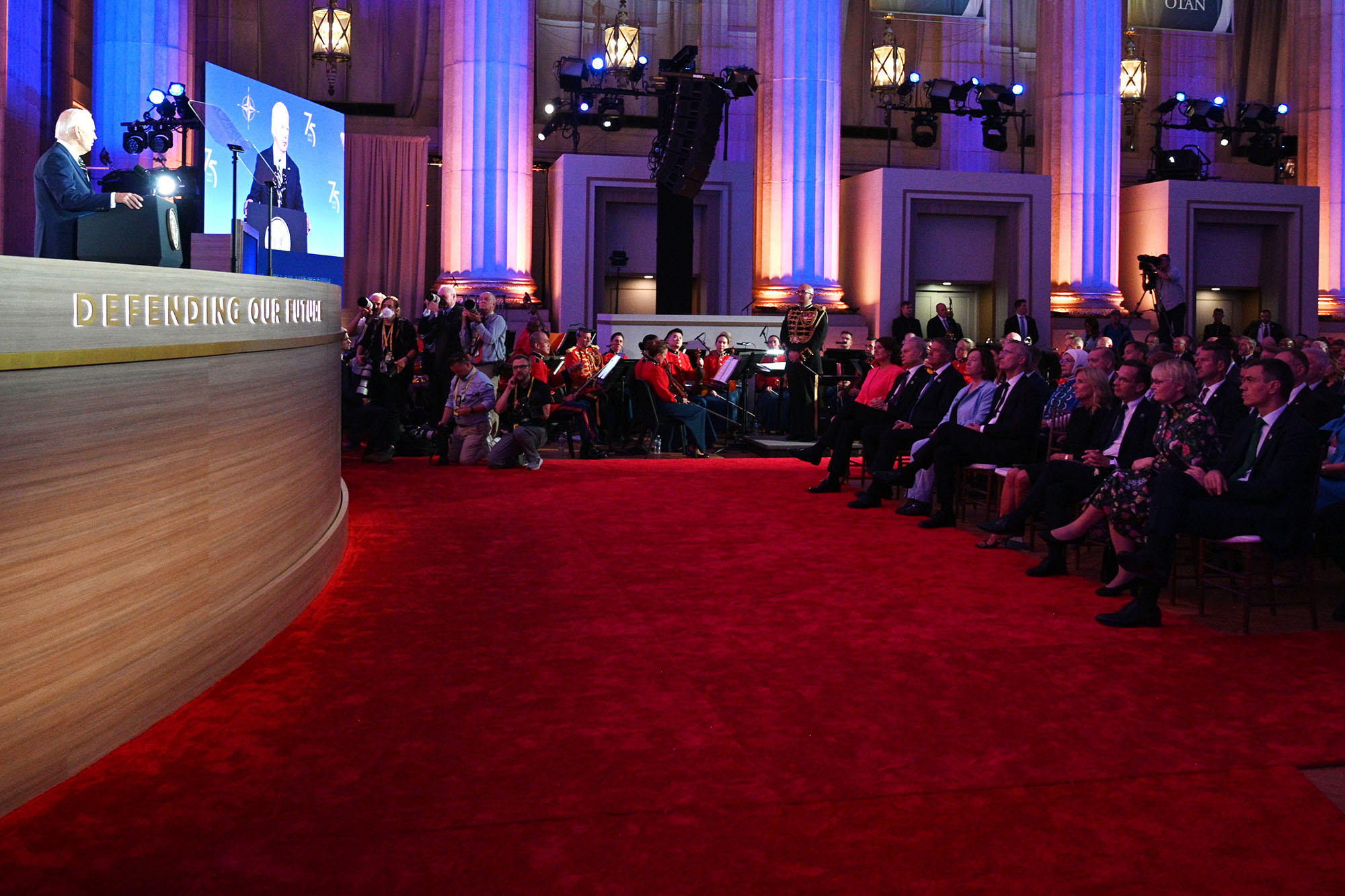
Celebration of the 75th anniversary of NATO on the 9th of July 2024
