= William Jefferson Clinton Federal Building =

Historic complex in Washington, D.C.

- U.S. Historic district – Contributing property
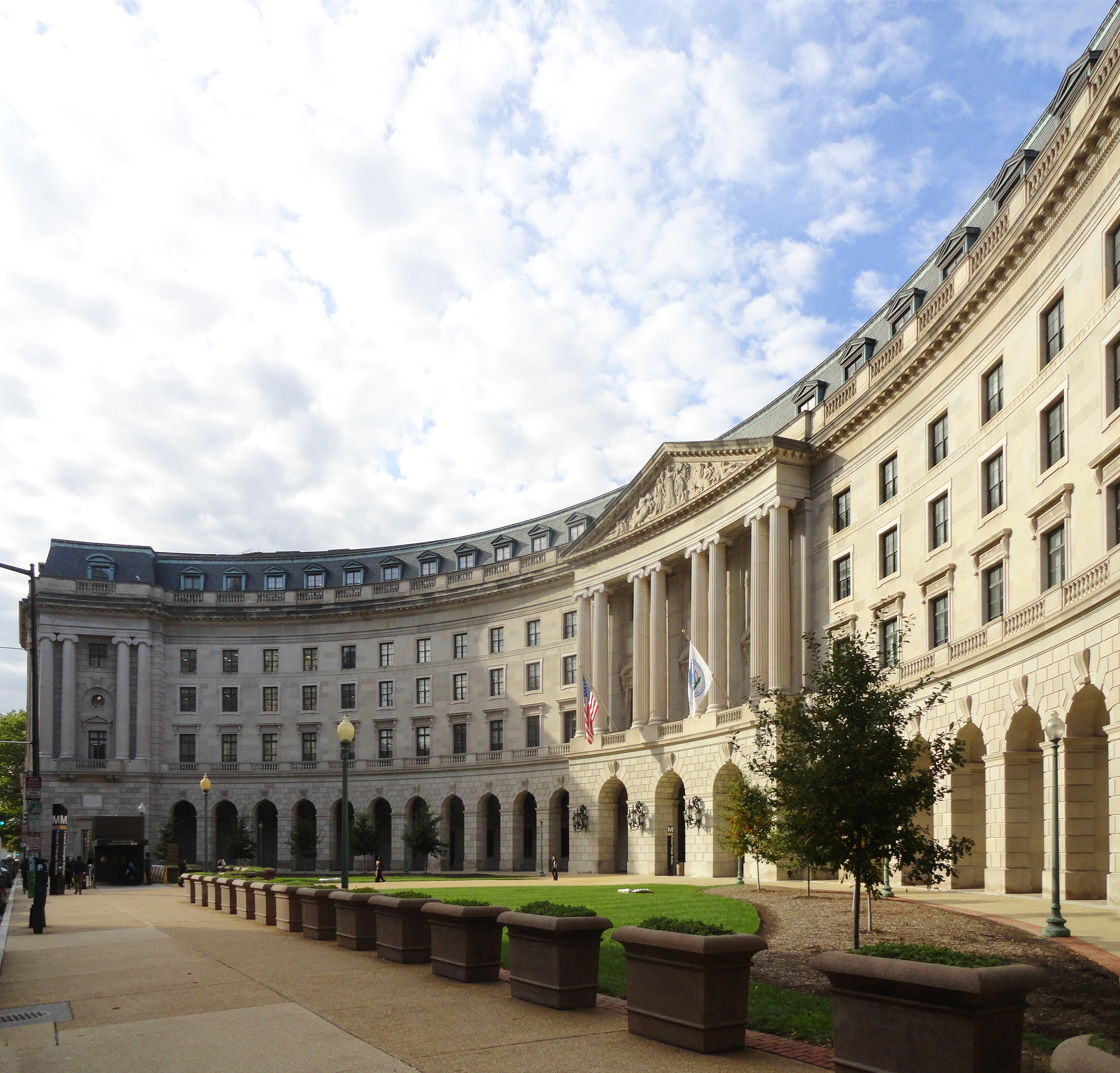
- The main entrance on 12th Street, NW in 2018

- Location within Washington, D.C. Location within the United States
- Location: 12th Street and Pennsylvania Avenue, NW; Washington, D.C.
- Coordinates: 38°53′38.04″N 77°1′44.04″W
- Area: 6 acres (2.4 ha)
- Built: 1934; 92 years ago
- Architect: William Adams Delano, Chester Holmes Aldrich
- Architectural style: Classical Revival
- Part of: Pennsylvania Avenue National Historic Site (ID66000865)

The William Jefferson Clinton Federal Building is a complex of several historic buildings located in the Federal Triangle in Washington, D.C., across 12th Street, NW from the Old Post Office. The complex now houses the headquarters of the Environmental Protection Agency (EPA).

One component of the complex was originally called the New Post Office, and housed the headquarters of the Post Office Department until that department was replaced by the United States Postal Service in 1971 and which vacated the building. Subsequently, the Bureau of Alcohol, Tobacco, Firearms and Explosives (BATFE) occupied this building, which Congress renamed as the Ariel Rios Federal Building in 1985. BATFE vacated the building in the early 1990s, and EPA moved in after a renovation.

To consolidate its headquarters offices, EPA also took occupancy of two adjacent buildings beginning in the late 1990s: the Interstate Commerce Commission (ICC) building and the Department of Labor Building, on Constitution Avenue, NW. In 2013, Congress renamed the Ariel Rios Federal Building in honor of former president Bill Clinton, and the General Services Administration extended the designation to the former ICC and Labor buildings. (The new BATFE headquarters building received the name Ariel Rios Federal Building in 2016.)

== History ==
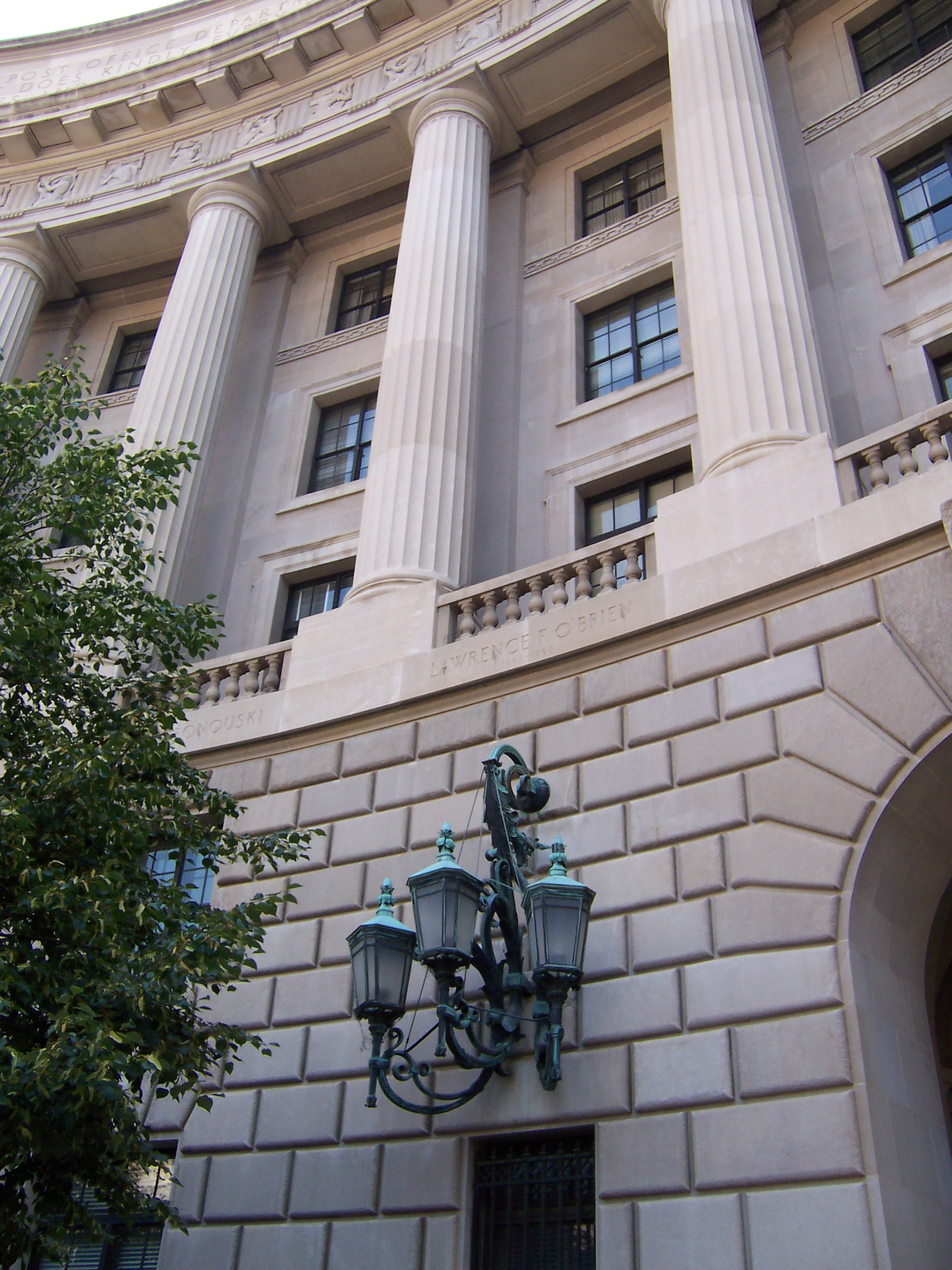
Columns and lamps, Clinton Building

Spiral stairs

Inlaid floor

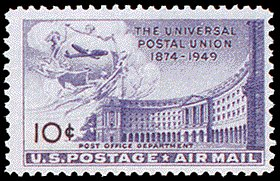
1949 US airmail stamp showing the Clinton Building in the background

In the early 1930s, the area that was to become the Federal Triangle was one of the city's most blighted neighborhoods, known as Murder Bay and as a center of crime and prostitution. The plan for the area's redevelopment was laid out as part of the 1901 McMillan Plan, the first federally funded urban redevelopment plan. Redevelopment of the Federal Triangle began in earnest in the 1930s, during the Great Depression, under the leadership of Treasury Secretary Andrew W. Mellon.

=== Andrew W. Mellon Auditorium ===
In recognition of name changes of the complex, the United States General Services Administration designates some historical events which occurred at the Andrew W. Mellon Auditorium as historical events which occurred at the Clinton Building.

=== New Post Office Building ===
Construction of the New Post Office Building was completed in 1934. The Post Office headquarters was a central feature of the redevelopment. The neoclassical building was designed by architects William Adams Delano and Chester Holmes Aldrich, who took as their inspiration the Place Vendôme in Paris. The central section of the tri-unit building consists of two huge, back to back, semicircular units with side wings. The semicircle formed by the building's curve on its eastern façade was to be mirrored by a similarly curved façade built across 12th Street on the site of the Old Post Office Building.

Secretary Mellon's building commission actively sought the demolition of the Old Post Office to fulfill that plan, but preservation efforts—which continued over the course of 50 years—saved the Old Post Office. The second half of the grand plaza was never finished as designed, save for a curve in the northwest corner of the headquarters of the Internal Revenue Service. (The nearby Ronald Reagan Building, completed in 1998, does mirror, to some degree, the semicircle of the west façade of the Clinton Building.)

The exterior is decorated with bas relief panels, by Adolph Alexander Weinman.

The original design of the headquarters building included a local branch post office, called Benjamin Franklin Station. This branch, with entrances on Pennsylvania Avenue, is extant as of 2018.

In the 1990s, the General Services Administration (GSA) refurbished the former Post Office building and preserved the architectural details of the hallways in the style of the 1920s and 1930s. A seven-story marble spiral staircase is a prominent element of the building's interior. A chandelier hangs in the center of the staircase and has exposed bulbs to illuminate each floor. It terminates in a dramatic chrome and brass globe.

=== Department of Labor Building ===
Arthur Brown, Jr. designed the Labor building between 1928 and 1931, and construction was completed in 1934. The building entrance is at 1301 Constitution Avenue, NW.

The Department of Labor was the original occupant of the building. It vacated the building in 1979, when it moved to the Frances Perkins Building. The Customs Service took occupancy in 1979 and remained until the late 1990s. This agency moved to the Ronald Reagan Building and International Trade Center. In 2002 EPA moved in, and the building was designated as the "EPA West" building.

=== Interstate Commerce Commission Building ===
Arthur Brown, Jr. designed the ICC Building, completed in 1934, in a style similar to the Labor building. The building entrance is at 1201 Constitution Avenue, NW. The Interstate Commerce Commission occupied the building until 1995. EPA moved in after a renovation.

== Building occupants and renaming ==
The Post Office Department occupied its headquarters building until the early 1970s. The department was reorganized in 1971 as the United States Postal Service, an independent agency. It vacated the building for another location. The Bureau of Alcohol, Tobacco, Firearms and Explosives (BATFE) was the next occupant, through the early 1990s. Congress renamed the New Post Office Building as the Ariel Rios Federal Building on February 5, 1985, in honor of Ariel Rios, an undercover BATFE special agent, who was killed in the line of duty on December 2, 1982. In the early 1990s, BATFE moved out of the building. It was renovated for EPA, which occupied it next. (BATFE is now in its own building on New York Avenue.)

The building also flanks the historic Andrew W. Mellon Auditorium.

In the late 1990s, EPA consolidated its headquarters offices in the Federal Triangle, bringing employees from leased space into two adjacent buildings: the ICC building and the Department of Labor Building, on Constitution Avenue, NW. In December 2012, both houses of Congress unanimously voted to rename the Ariel Rios Building as the William Jefferson Clinton Federal Building, after Bill Clinton, the 42nd president. GSA administratively renamed the building for Clinton on May 13, 2013. The structure was formally dedicated at a ceremony on July 17, 2013, at which Clinton spoke and former EPA administratrator Carol Browner attended.

The Rios family approved of renaming a building. A reflecting pool at the new ATF headquarters on New York Avenue NW was named for Rios. GSA extended the Clinton building designation to include the former ICC and Labor buildings.

== Murals ==
The Clinton Federal Building was one of the initial locations that integrated various New Deal artworks that were originally commissioned and displayed in federally constructed buildings by the Treasury Department Section of Fine Arts during the 1930s and 1940s. Six of the 25 mural commissions awarded have been criticized by visitors and employees as to stereotyping American Indians and displaying inappropriate images.

GSA addressed the controversy:

The U.S. Post Office headquarters murals embody many admirable qualities of American art and culture in the 1930s: a range of visual styles, inventive approaches to subject matter, commitment to bringing creativity and artistic beauty to public spaces, and devotion to the development of American art as a part of national identity. At the same time, engrained cultural attitudes of the 1930s are inevitably present, including stereotypes about women, Native Americans, African Americans, and rural Americans. From Ward Lockwood and Karl Free's depictions of Native Americans and African Americans as subservient to white colonists, to William Palmer and Frank Mechau's emphasis on the aggression of Native Americans and the passive victimhood of women, to Doris Lee's romanticized views of farm life during the Depression, the murals perpetuate outmoded views of their era. Today, the presence of the murals in this building offers a rare opportunity to experience a full cycle of New Deal artwork in its original context, and serves as a valuable reminder of how American society has changed over time".

Controversy over New Deal murals was also prevalent during their installation and afterward, if for different reasons. Some viewers objected to the nudity in some of the murals and to revolutionary sentiments they believed were implicit in some works. There was extended public debate.

=== Gallery ===
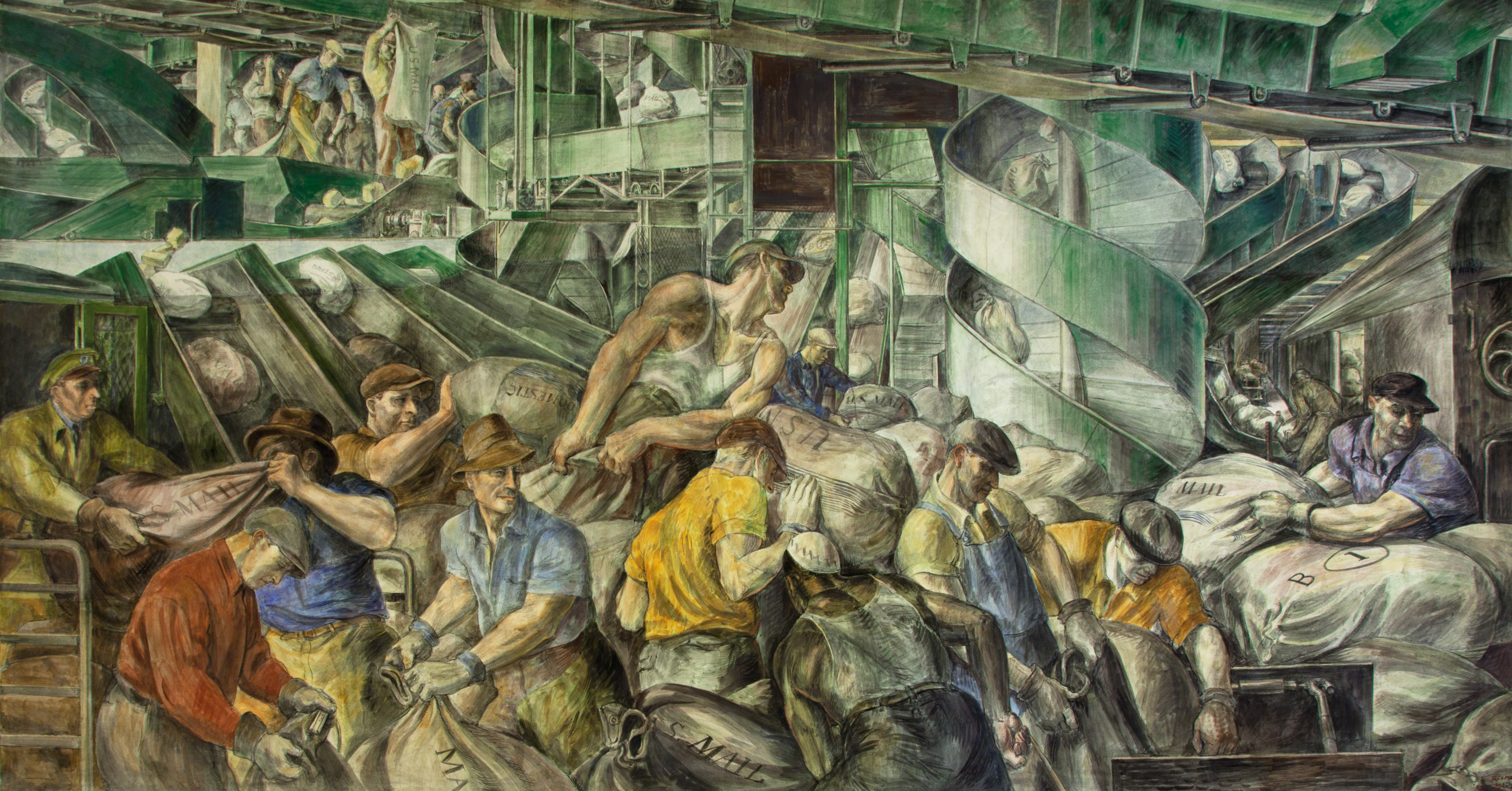
Sorting the Mail (1936) by Reginald Marsh

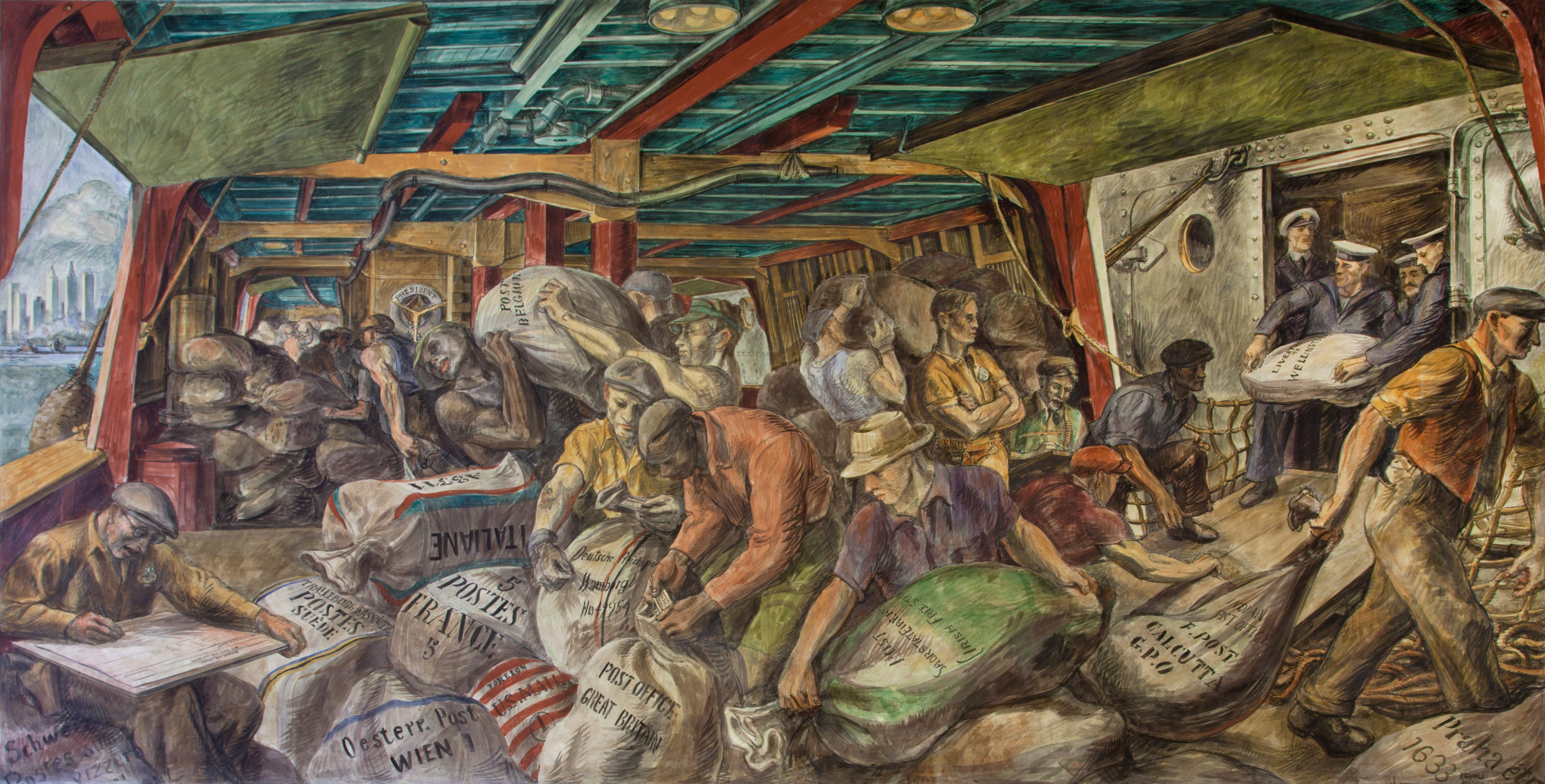
Unloading the Mail (1936) by Reginald Marsh

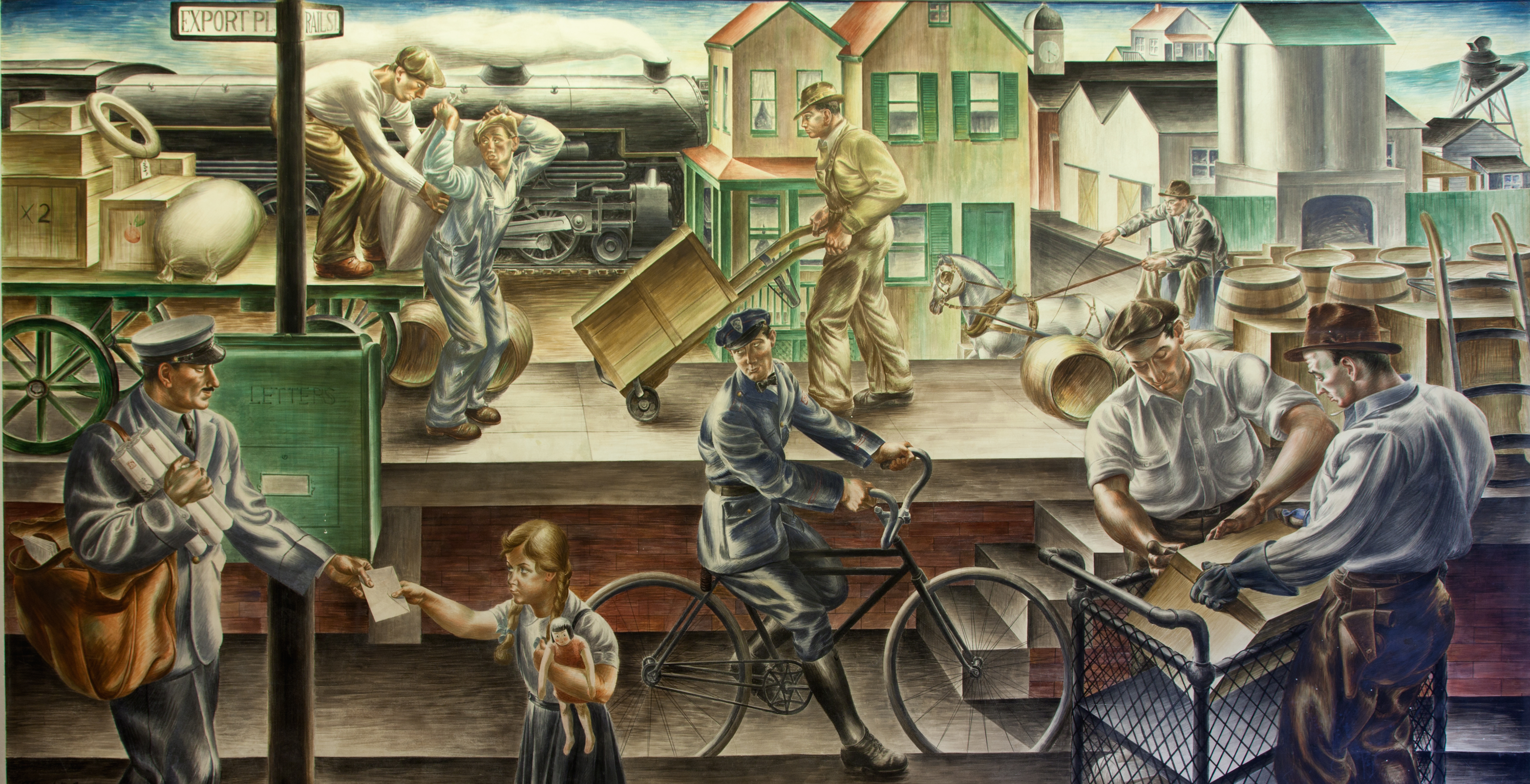
Transportation of the Mail (1937) by Alfredo Crimi

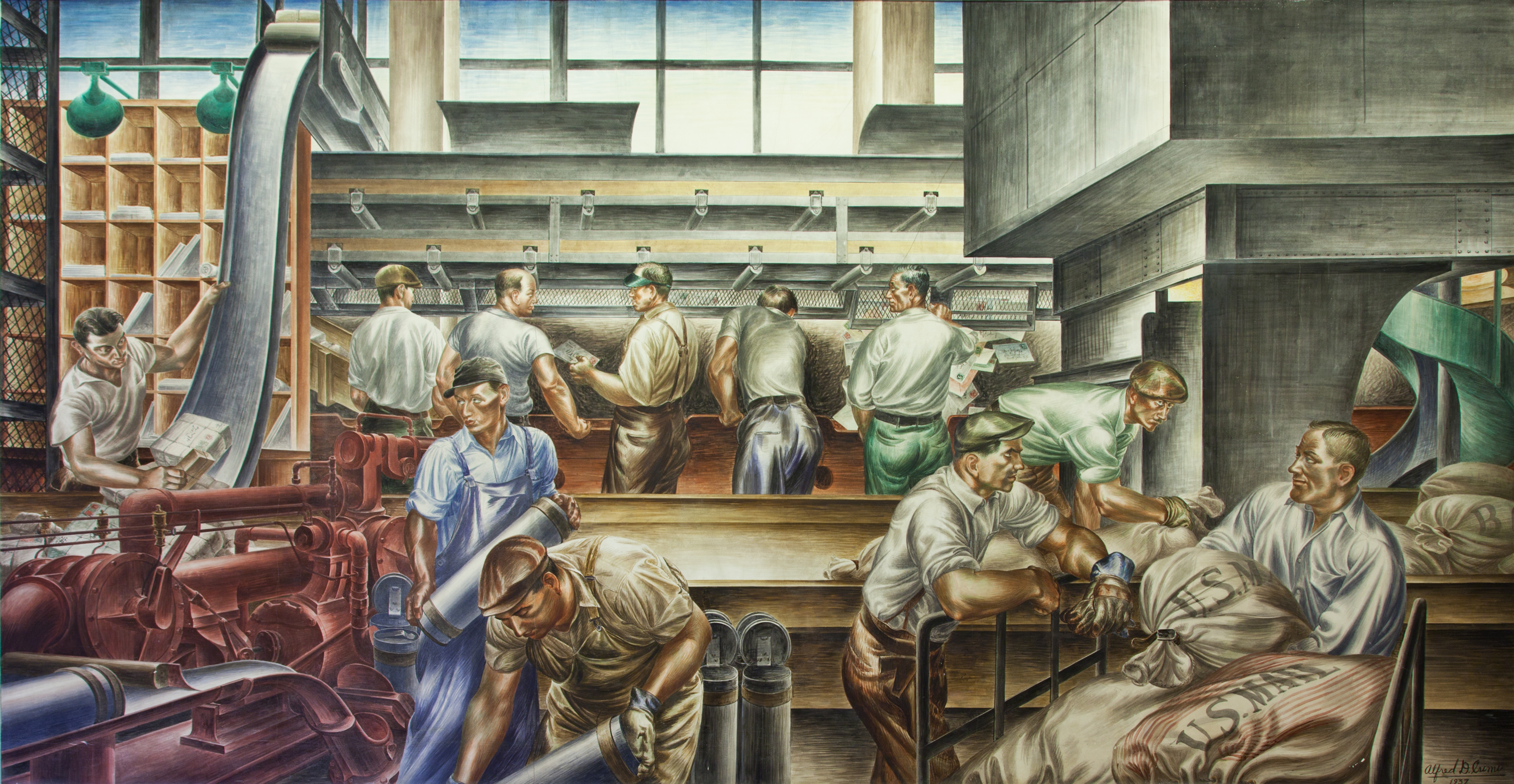
Post Office Work Room (1937) by Alfredo Crimi

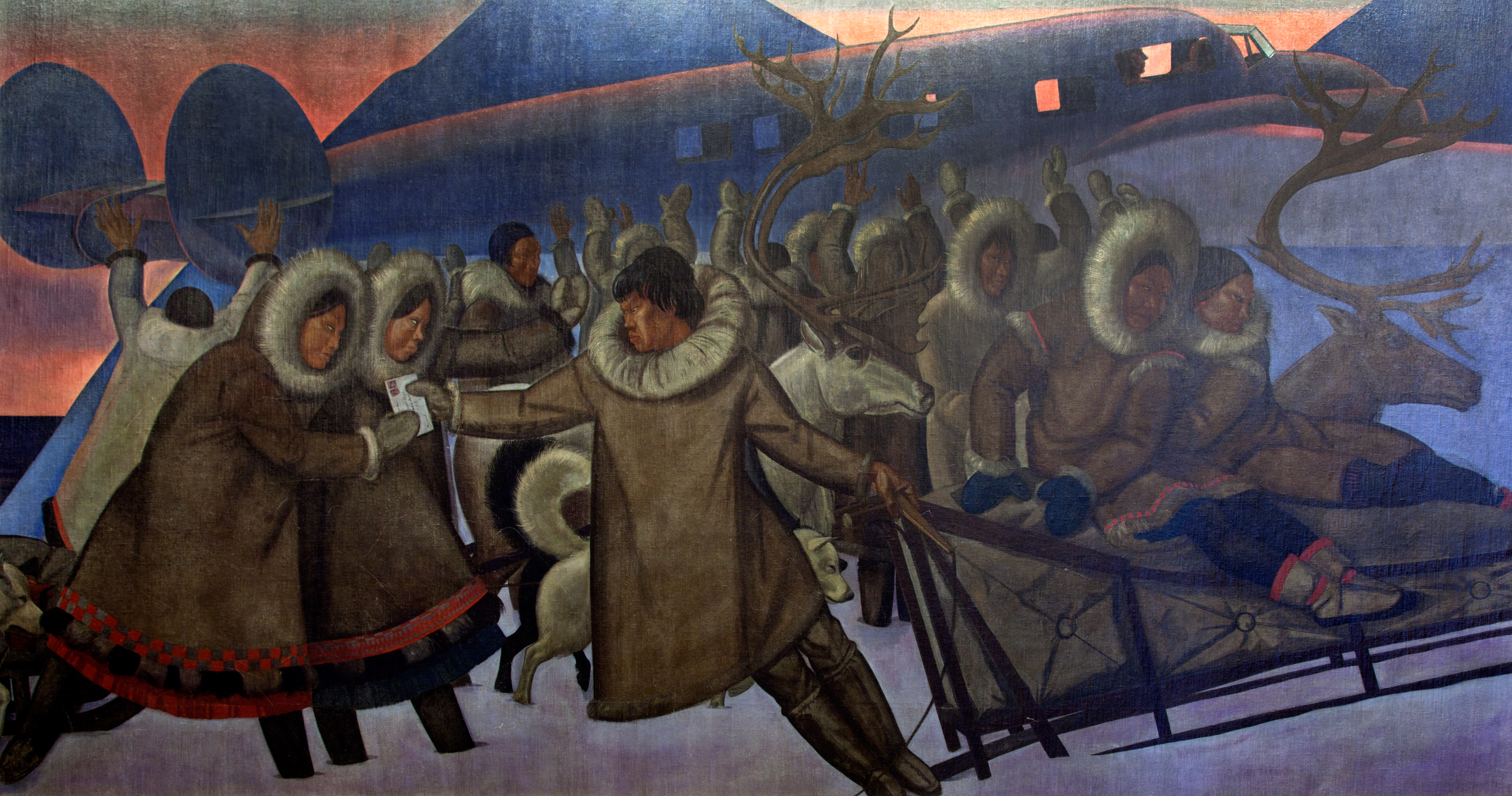
Mail Service in the Arctic (1937) by Rockwell Kent

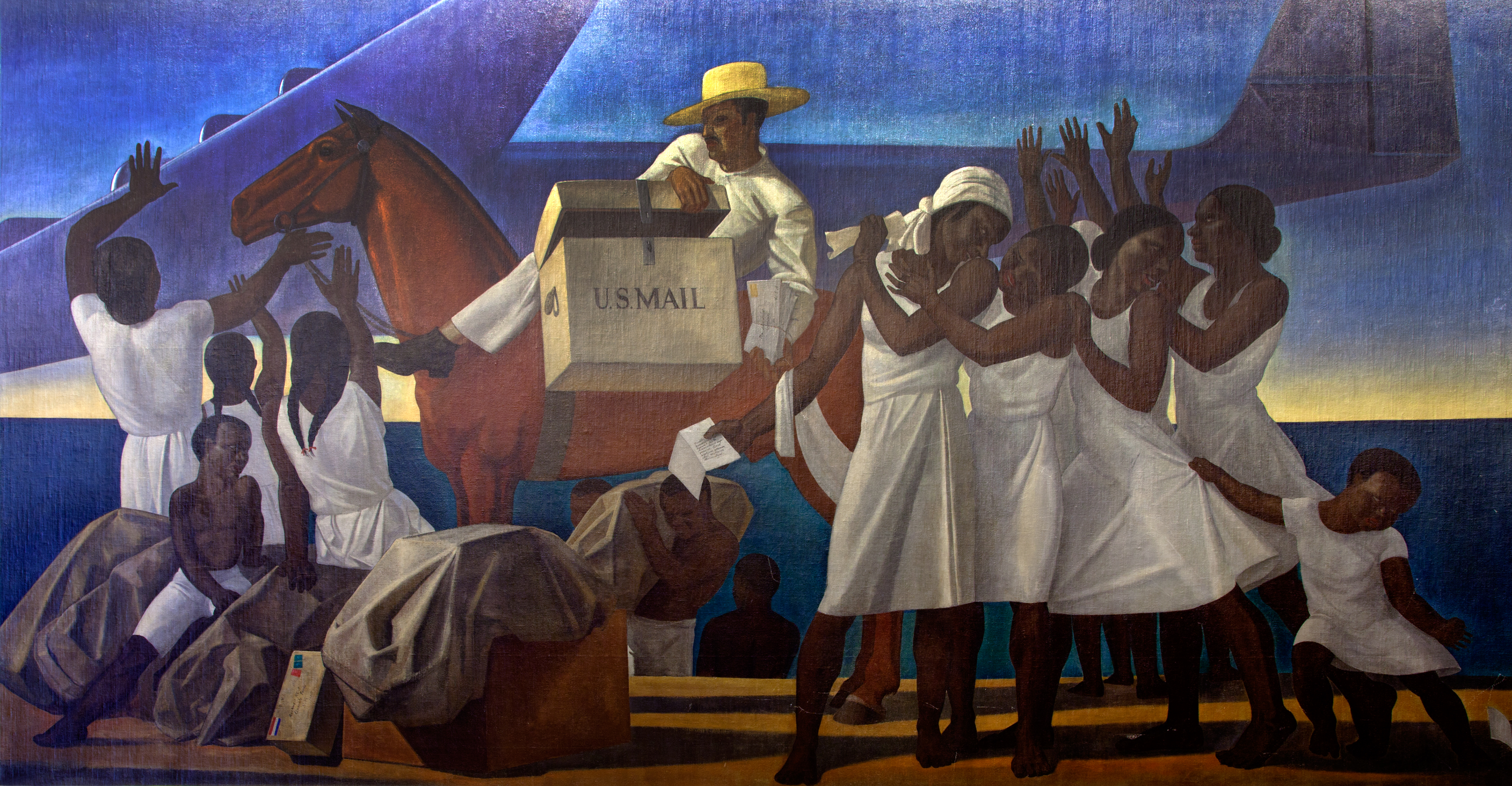
Mail Service in the Tropics (1937) by Rockwell Kent

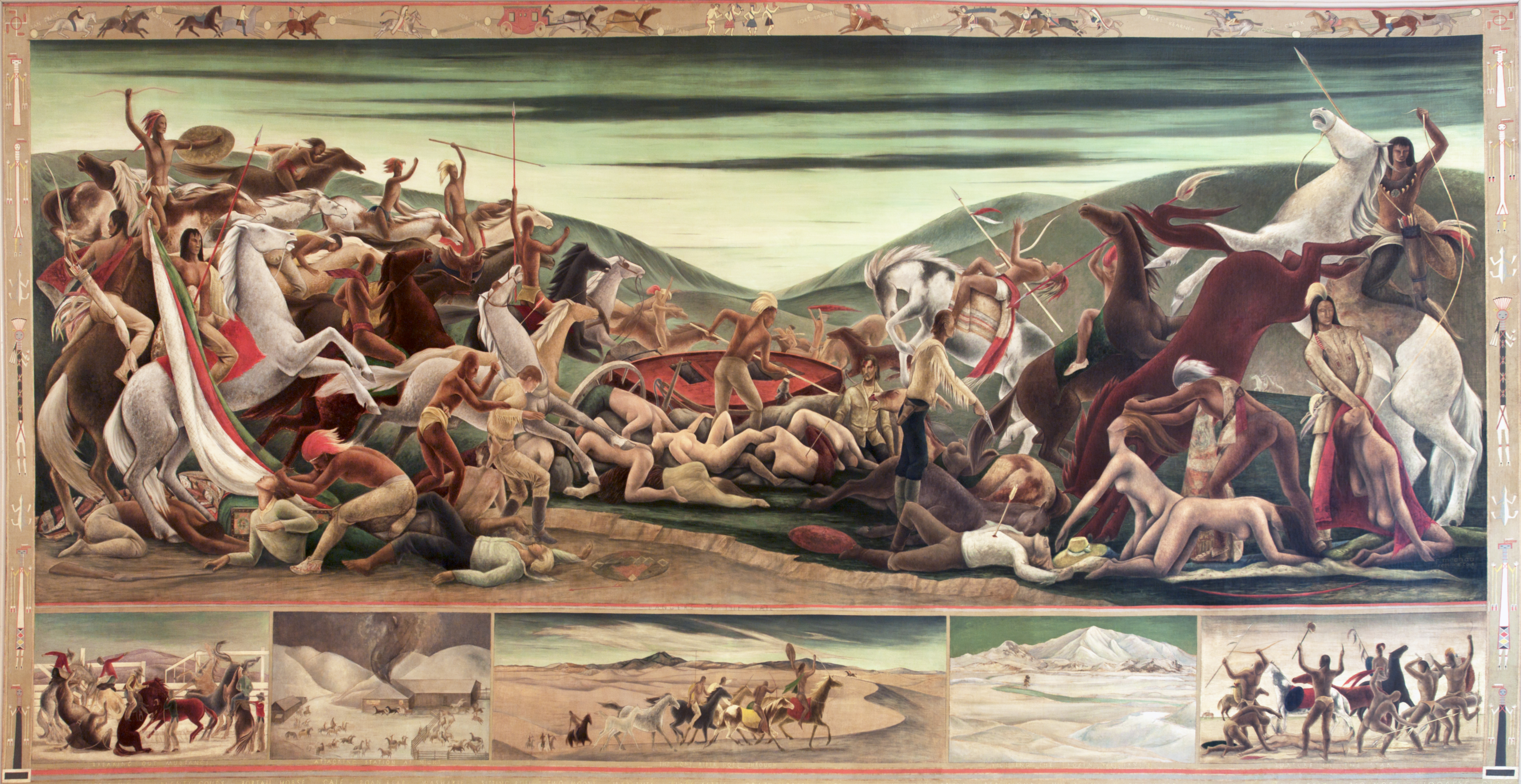
Dangers of the Mail (1937) by Frank Mechau

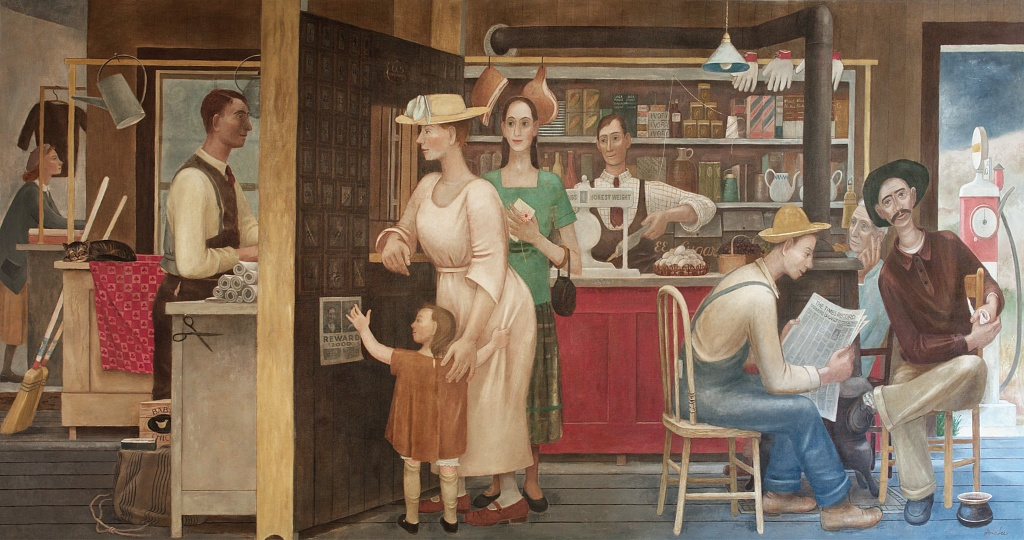
General Store and Post Office (1938) by Doris Lee

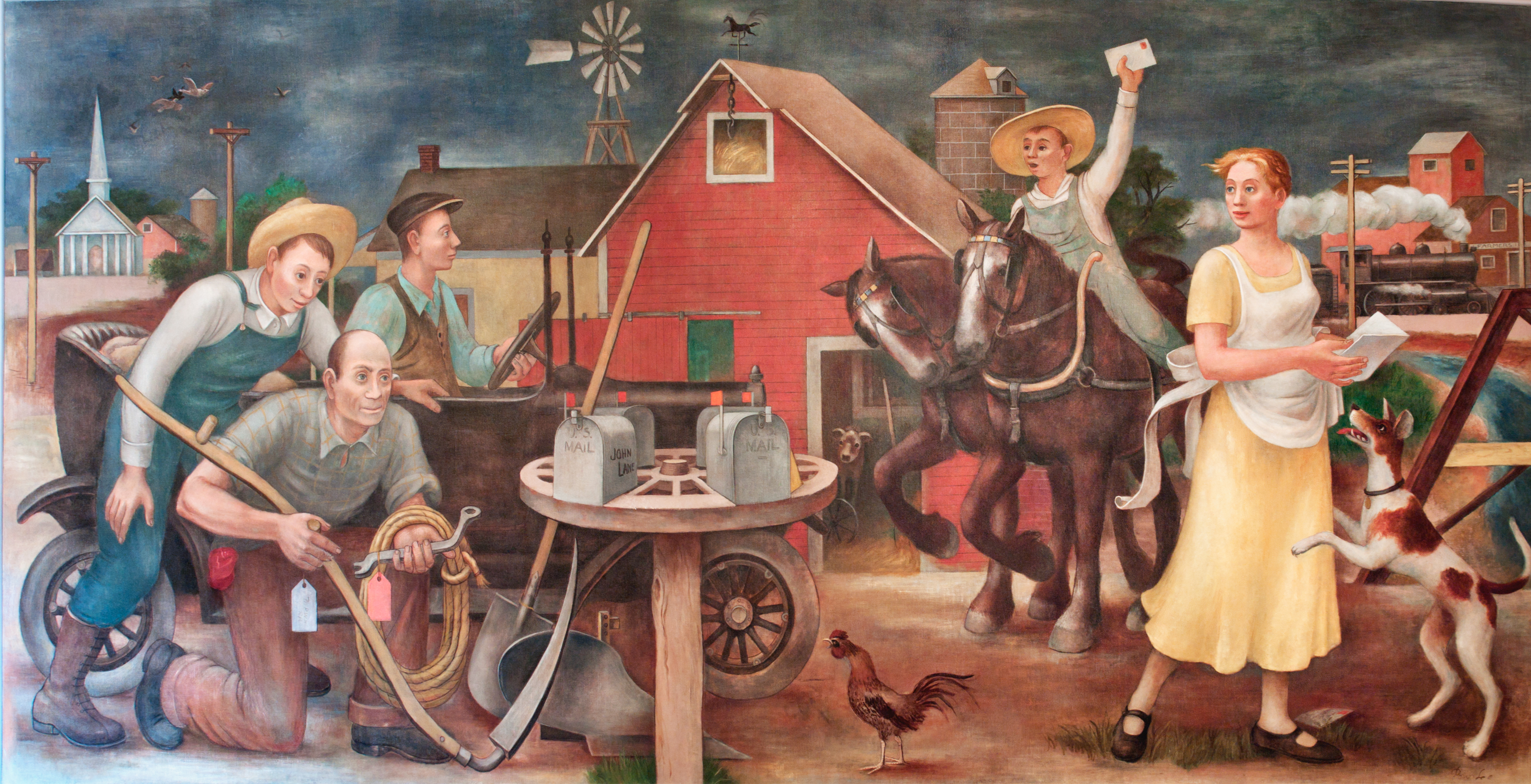
Country Post (1938) by Doris Lee

== Renovation ==
In 1993, the building was renovated. In 1998, the limestone facade was renovated. In 2007, the south courtyard was renovated.
