= St. Joseph's Hospital (San Francisco) =

- U.S. National Register of Historic Places
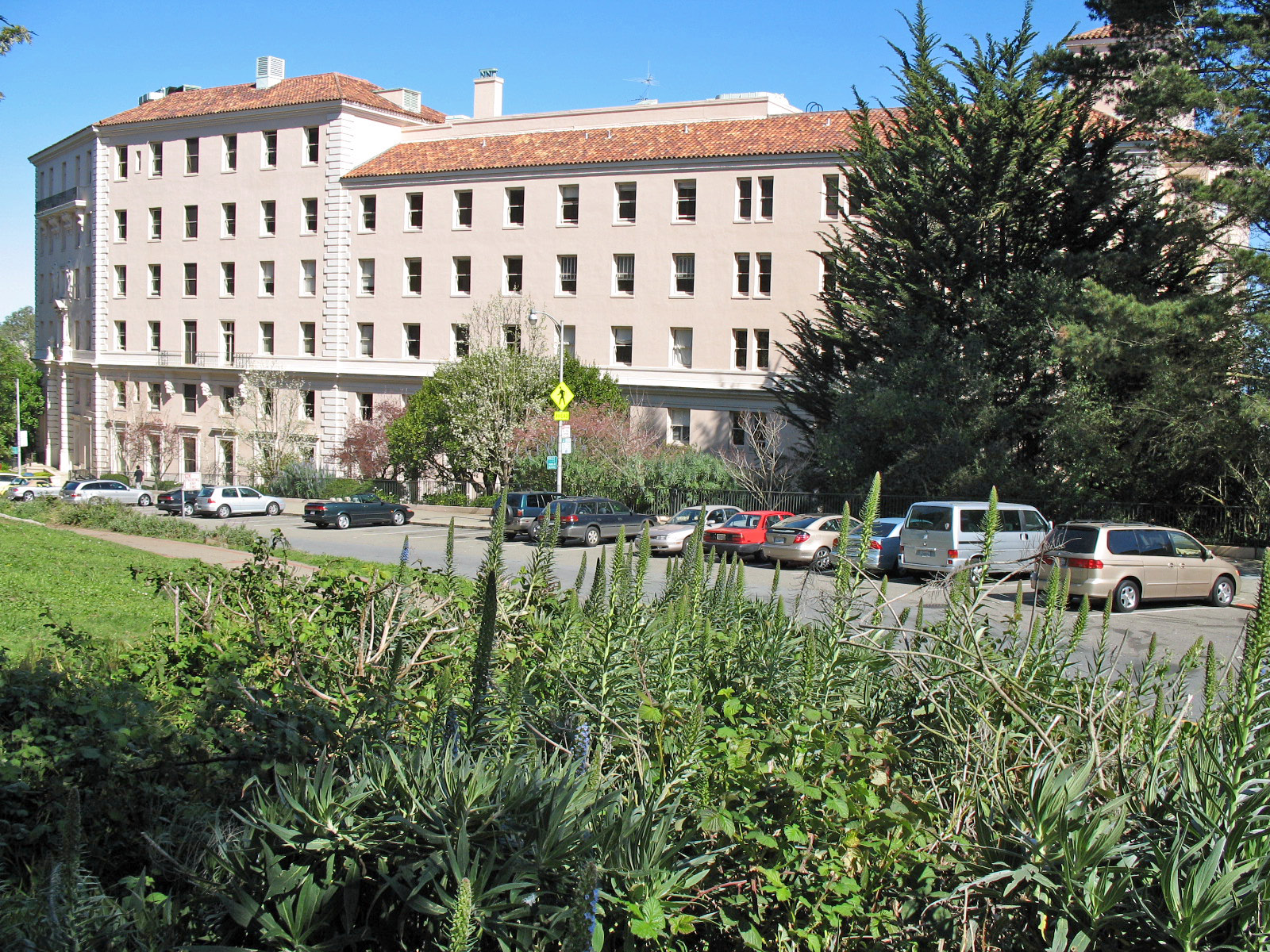

- Location within San Francisco County Location within California Location within the United States
- Location: 355 Buena Vista Ave. East, San Francisco, California
- Coordinates: 37°46′3″N 122°26′19″W
- Area: 2.8 acres (1.1 ha)
- Built: 1928
- Architects: Bakewell & Brown
- Architectural style: Spanish Renaissance Revival
- NRHP reference No.: 85001016
- Added to NRHP: May 9, 1985

St. Joseph's Hospital is a historic building and a former church hospital, located at 355 Buena Vista Avenue East in San Francisco, California. It was built in 1928 by architects Bakewell and Brown in a Spanish Renaissance Revival style. It was added to the National Register of Historic Places on May 9, 1985.

== History ==
St. Joseph's Hospital was founded at this location in 1889, and was built by a charitable donation to the Catholic church. The Franciscan Sisters provided medical care and administration and some of the patients were given care on a charity basis.

The hospital was delicensed on September 6, 1979, and was eventually converted to condominium apartments. The exterior of the buildings was preserved in the conversion.

== See also ==
- National Register of Historic Places listings in San Francisco
