= Arthur Brown Jr. =

American architect (1874–1957)

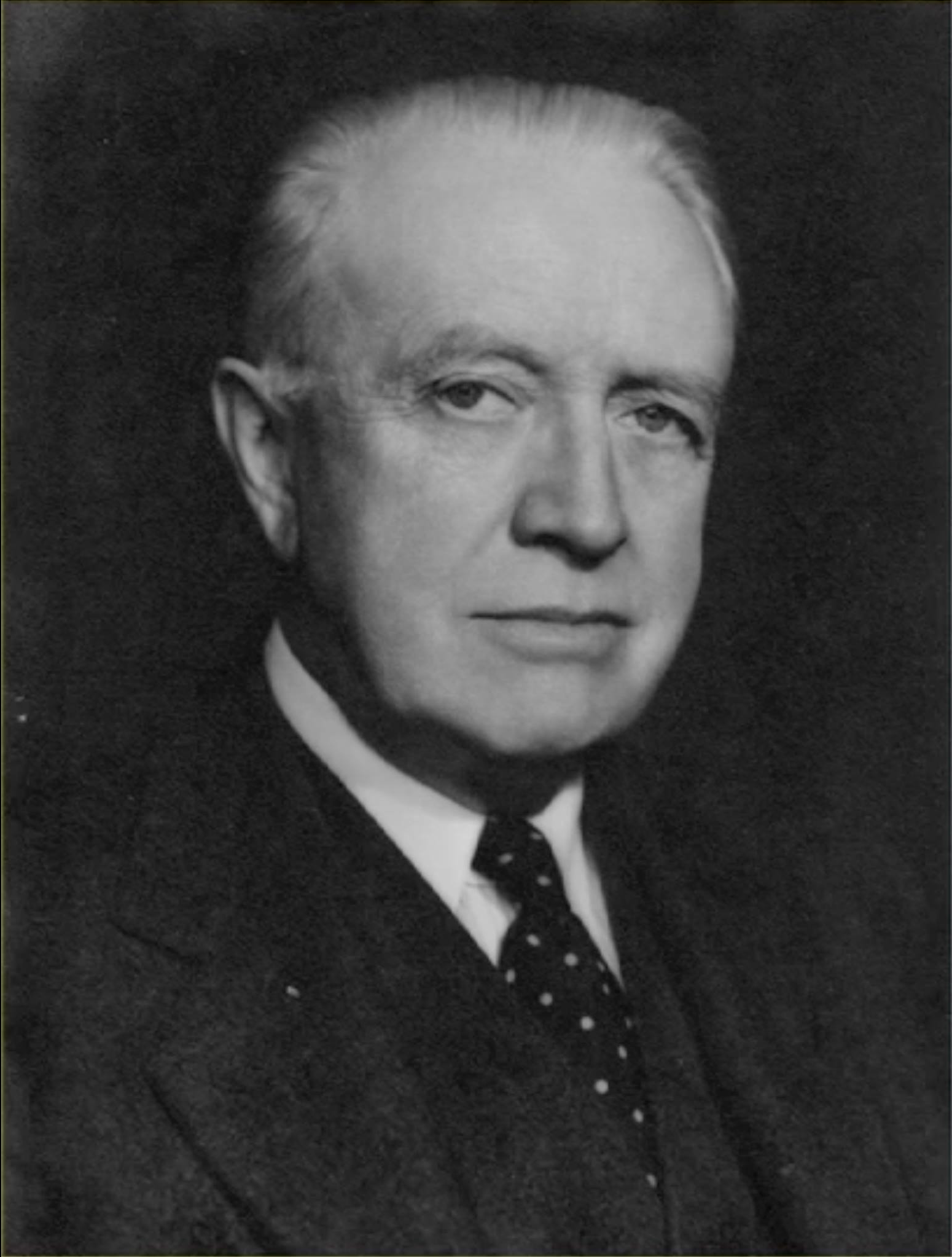
- Image of Arthur Brown Jr in his 50s
- Born: May 21, 1874; Oakland, California, US
- Died: July 7, 1957 (aged 83); San Mateo County, California, US
- Occupation: Architect
- Years active: 1905-1949

Arthur Brown Jr. (May 21, 1874—July 7, 1957) was an American architect, based in San Francisco and designer of many of its landmarks. He is known for his work with John Bakewell Jr. as Bakewell and Brown, along with later works after the partnership dissolved in 1927.

== Career ==
Brown was a member of Beta Theta Pi fraternity and graduated from the University of California, Berkeley in 1896, where he and his future partner, John Bakewell Jr. (1872–1963), also a member of Beta Theta Pi, were both protégés of famed Bay Area architect Bernard Maybeck. Brown went to Paris and graduated from the École des Beaux-Arts in 1901, attending the atelier of Victor Laloux, before returning to San Francisco to establish his practice with Bakewell in 1905.

Their first commissions included the interior of the City of Paris department store and the city hall for Berkeley, California, before entering the competition for the 1915 San Francisco City Hall for which they are best known. Brown also designed the city's War Memorial Opera House and Veterans Building, the former in collaboration with G. Albert Lansburgh. Brown was meticulously trained in the rigorous Beaux-Arts tradition, and in the City Hall project his attention extended to the smallest details of light fixtures, floor patterning and doorknobs.

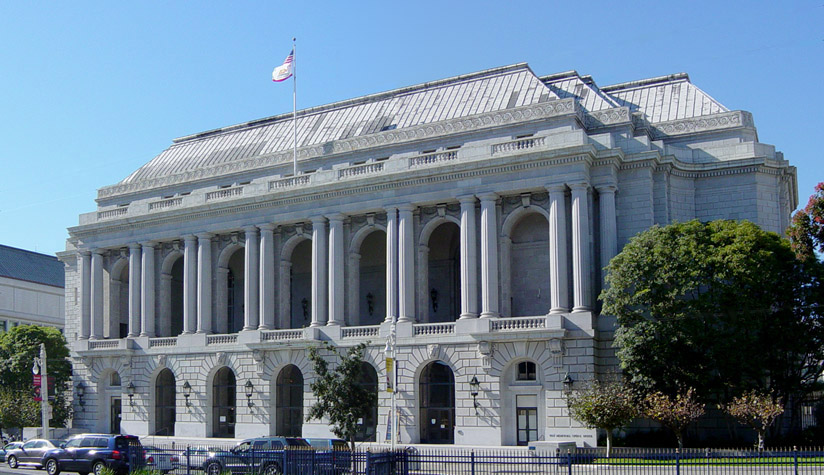
War Memorial Opera House, San Francisco

In addition to their well-known monumental works, Bakewell and Brown designed several homes in the Arts and Crafts style championed by Maybeck. Early among them were two redwood framed "double houses" for Stanford University in 1908, and the only fraternity house they designed de novo, the Beta Chi Chapter House of Sigma Nu in 1910 (razed by the University in 1991 despite student and alumni efforts to give it historic designation and restore it). They later designed additions to Ernest Coxhead's 1893 Beta Theta Pi house they had lived in as undergraduates, now a listed Berkeley landmark.

The firm went on to design a series of familiar San Francisco landmarks, and many buildings at Stanford University, before Brown dissolved the partnership in 1927. For contractual reasons many buildings at Stanford through the 1930s continued to be credited to both.

Bakewell and Brown also designed the Byzantine-inspired Temple Emanu-El (1926) at Lake St. and Arguello Blvd. in San Francisco, and the Pasadena City Hall (1927).

Most of Brown's later San Francisco works employed a stripped-down classicism. The poured-concrete Art Moderne Coit Tower (1932), that crowns Telegraph Hill is an important Modernist landmark in the Bay Area. Coit Tower was the site of some of the first public works murals executed under the Public Works Administration, later known as the WPA. "The primitive nature of Coit Tower would lend itself better to that sort of thing than other public buildings," was Arthur Brown's first reaction to the project. Diego Rivera included Brown among the designers and craftsmen in his fresco mural of The Making of a Fresco Showing the Building of a City (1931).

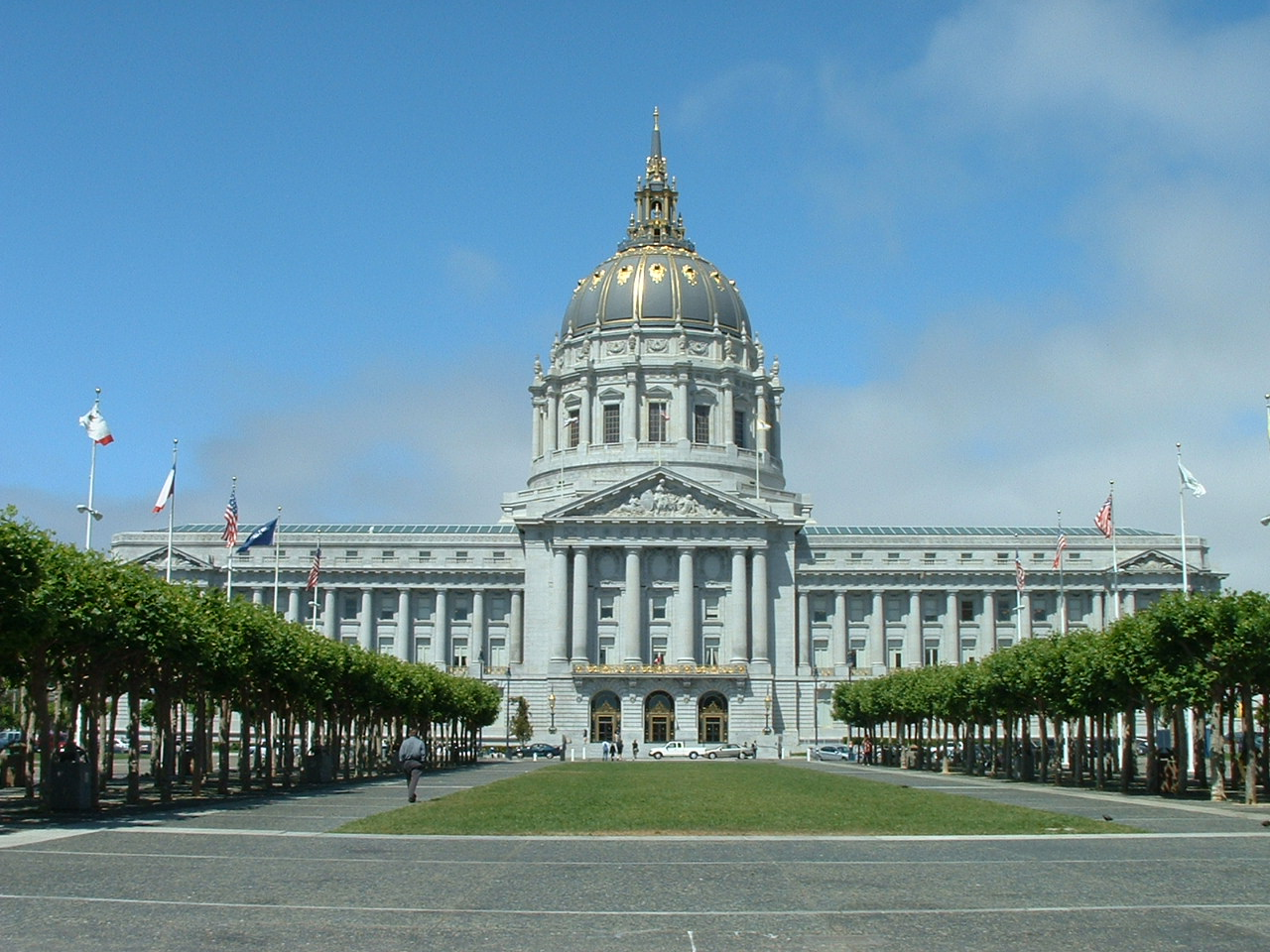
San Francisco City Hall, completed 1915

In Washington, D.C., Brown designed the Interstate Commerce Commission Building, its near-twin the Department of Labor Building, and the Andrew W. Mellon Auditorium. All three form part of the Federal Triangle, the largest construction project undertaken by the US Federal government prior to The Pentagon. Preliminary designs were begun in 1927, with construction in the Depression years between 1932 and 1934. The new buildings were to be designed to reflect the "dignity and power of the nation."

Brown's last works were primarily at UC Berkeley, where Brown served as campus planner and chief architect from 1936 to 1950. His principal buildings there include Sproul Hall, the Bancroft Library, and the Cyclotron Building, commissioned by Ernest Lawrence and J. Robert Oppenheimer.

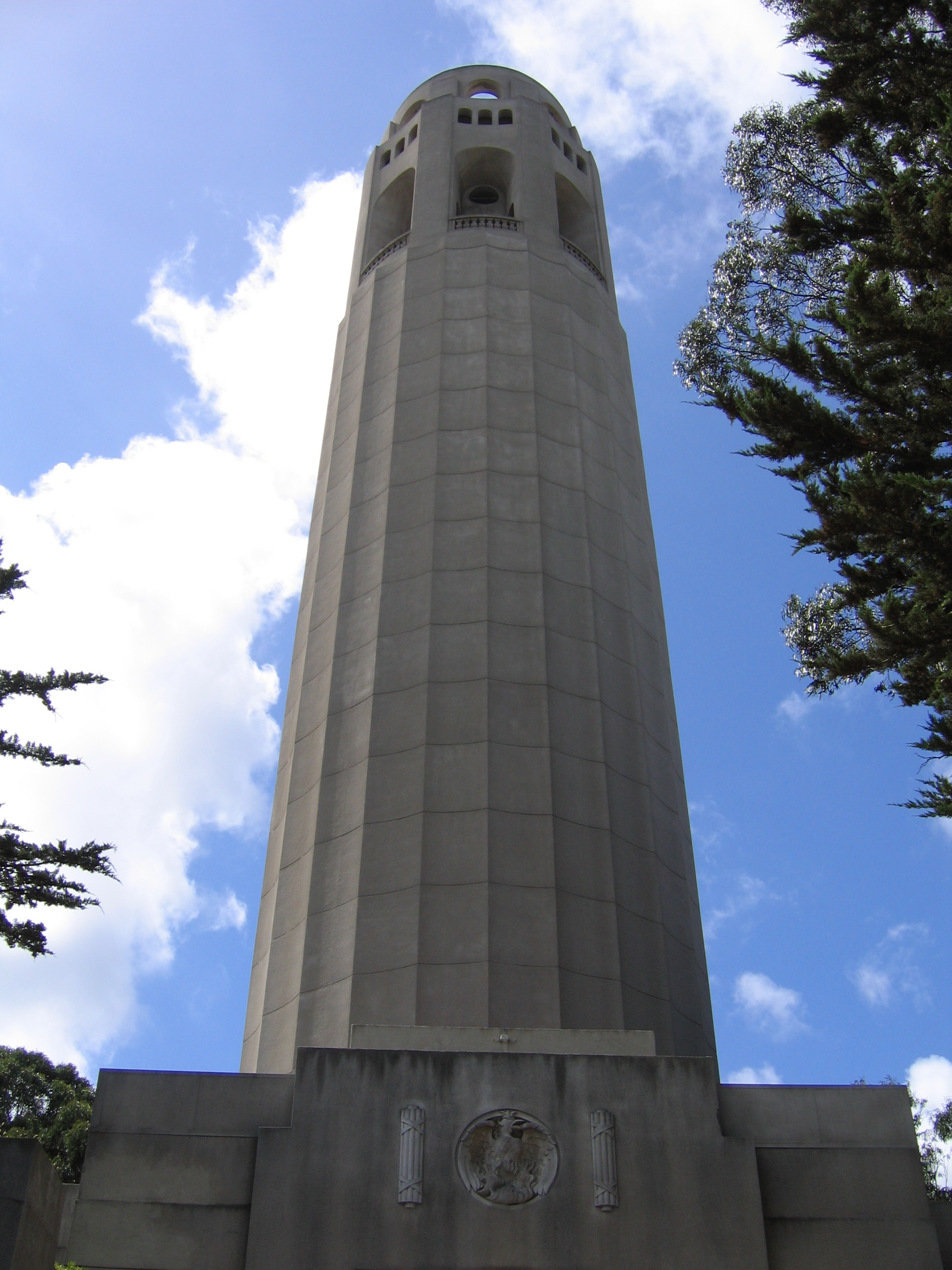
Coit Tower, dedicated 1933

Brown was elected a Fellow in the American Institute of Architects in 1930. Among the draftsmen in his office was Clarence W. W. Mayhew. In 1943, Brown was elected into the National Academy of Design as an Associate member, and became a full member in 1953.

== Work ==
In San Francisco unless otherwise noted:

- Folger Estate, Woodside, California, 1905
- Interior of City of Paris Dry Goods Co., 1906–1909
- Old Berkeley City Hall, Berkeley, California, 1908–1909
- "Double Houses" and Beta Chi Chapter House of Sigma Nu, Stanford University, 1908–1910
- Horticulture Building, Panama-Pacific International Exposition, 1915
- San Francisco City Hall, 1915
- Union Station (San Diego, California), 1915
- Cecil H. Green Library, Stanford University, 1919
- Burnham Pavilion, Stanford University, 1921
- Toyon Hall, Stanford University, 1923
- San Francisco Art Institute, 1925
- Temple Emanu-El, 1926
- Pacific Gas and Electric Company Building, 1926
- Sacramento Memorial Auditorium, Sacramento, California, 1926 (consulting architect)
- Pasadena City Hall, Pasadena, California, 1927
- St. Joseph's Hospital, 1928
- Cowell Memorial Hospital, UC Berkeley, 1930
- Roble Gym, Stanford University, 1931
- War Memorial Opera House, with G. Albert Lansburgh, 1932
- Department of Labor Building, Washington, D.C., 1934
- Andrew W. Mellon Auditorium, Washington, D.C., 1935
- 50 United Nations Plaza Federal Office Building, 1936
- Memorial Auditorium, Stanford University, 1937
- San Francisco Transbay Terminal, with Timothy L. Pflueger, 1939
- Hoover Tower, Stanford University, 1941
- Cyclotron Building, 1940; Sproul Hall, 1941; Minor Hall, 1941; Donner Laboratory, 1942; Bancroft Library, 1949, UC Berkeley
