= Toyon Hall =

Coordinates: 37°25′34″N 122°09′49″W

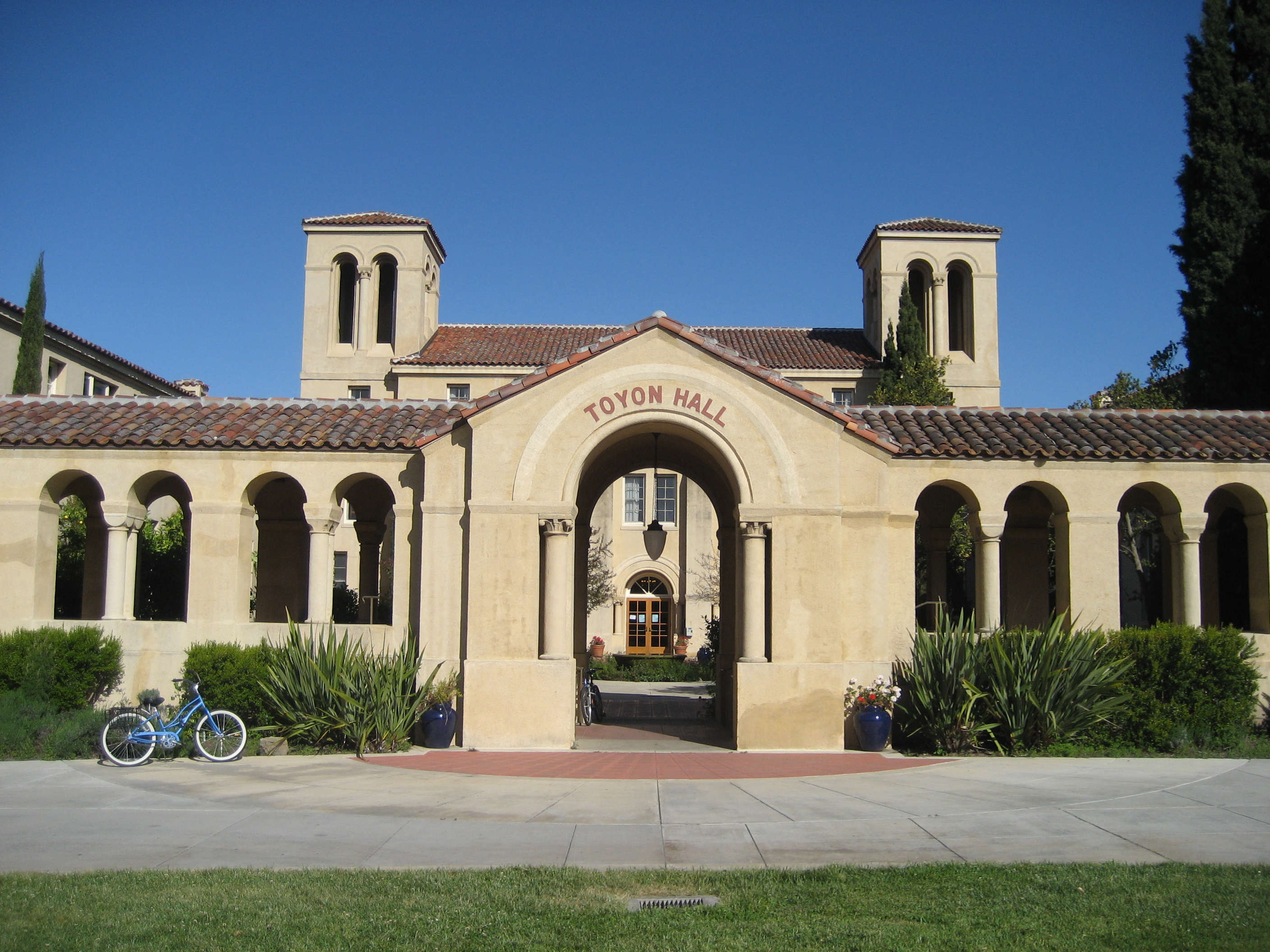
Toyon Hall

Toyon Hall is an upperclassman dormitory at Stanford University. Its Romanesque and Mediterranean Revival Style residence halls originally housed 150 men, but today Toyon is a co-ed dorm housing 158 residents. Each of its three floors is co-ed, and most rooms are two-room doubles.

Originally designed in 1923 by San Francisco architectural firm Bakewell and Brown, Toyon Hall was renovated in summer 2000 for seismic reinforcement and modern systems integration by Cody Anderson Wasney Architects Inc.

While past residents of Toyon organized their own eating clubs (The Stanford Eating Clubs), the Eating Clubs were closed in 2009. The residents of Toyon now eat in the new Arrillaga Family Dining Commons, located next door to Toyon.

Toyon Hall features a spacious lounge area which occasionally hosts campus events such as a capella shows, important speakers, and other social events. Stanford groups with an affiliation to Toyon Hall can request use of the lounge.

On 24 November 2000, Toyon was the subject of a Washington Post exposé titled "Pirating of Software Rampant on Campus."
