= Ariel Rios =

American ATF agent

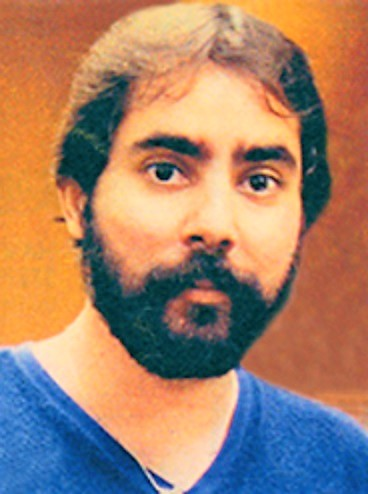
- ATF Special Agent Ariel Rios
- Born: April 5, 1954; New York, New York, U.S.
- Died: December 2, 1982 (aged 28); Miami, Florida, U.S.
- Resting place: Jayuya, Puerto Rico
- Education: John Jay College of Criminal Justice
- Occupation: Special Agent
- Employer: Bureau of Alcohol, Tobacco, Firearms and Explosives
- Children: 2

Ariel Rios (April 5, 1954 – December 2, 1982) was an undercover special agent for the United States Bureau of Alcohol, Tobacco, Firearms and Explosives (ATF), killed in the line of duty. He was a member of the Presidential anti-drug task force in South Florida.

== Biography ==
Ariel Rios was born in New York City to Puerto Rican parents. He graduated from William Howard Taft High School in February 1972, and immediately enrolled in John Jay College of Criminal Justice in Manhattan and received his B.S. in Criminal Justice in 1976. He married his high school sweetheart, Elsie Morales, immediately upon graduation. Rios started working as a guard with the Washington, D.C., and New York City Department of Corrections; he worked his way up to the Internal Affairs Unit. He then joined the ATF and took the oath of office on December 3, 1978. He completed his formal training at the Federal Law Enforcement Training Center in Glynco, Georgia, in 1979. After training, he was assigned to the New Haven office on June 3, 1979.

== Undercover operation ==
On December 2, 1982, as part of the Presidential anti-drug task force in South Florida, Special Agent Rios and his partner, Alexander D'Atri, were sent into a "buy and bust" undercover operation to negotiate a large cocaine deal from suspected drug traffickers. The meeting took place at the Hurricane Motel on West Flagler Street, Miami. The operation was going well until one of the suspects, standing by the window, noticed other agents closing in. When he pulled a gun, Rios moved forward in an attempt to disarm the man and save his fellow agents. While struggling with the drug dealer, he was shot in the face and died on the scene; his partner was seriously wounded. Rios was survived by his wife and two children. He was buried in Jayuya, Puerto Rico.

Citizens of Miami donated $23,000 to the Ariel Rios Memorial Fund. President Ronald Reagan invited the Rios and D'Atri families to the White House for a special tribute. The Secretary of the Treasury presented medals to Elsie Rios and Alexander D'Atri.

== Court sentencing ==
On April 20, 1983, the district court sentenced Augustin D. Alvarez and Mario C. Simon to life plus 50 years in federal prison, for the first-degree murder of the federal agent Ariel Rios and assault against federal officer Alexander D'Atri, cocaine conspiracy and distribution of cocaine, and using of a firearm during the commission of a felony; Oscar Hernandez to 30 years in prison; Victoriano Concepcion to 25 years in prison; and Eduardo Portal to 22 years in prison. Two other men were sentenced for lesser charges.

== Legacy ==
On February 5, 1985, the block-long federal building at 1200 Pennsylvania Avenue in Washington, D.C., that used to house the ATF Headquarters was renamed the Ariel Rios Federal Building in his honor. It now houses the United States Environmental Protection Agency headquarters. In May 2013, the building was renamed the William Jefferson Clinton Federal Building after former President Bill Clinton.

The Bureau of Alcohol, Tobacco, Firearms and Explosives (ATF) headquarters is now located at 99 New York Avenue NE in Washington, DC. In 2013, the ATF honored the memory of Special Agent Ariel Rios by naming the reflecting pool the Ariel Rios Reflecting Pool in accordance with the wishes of the family. In December 2016, this ATF Headquarters building was renamed the Ariel Rios Federal Building in his honor.

In 2003, a stretch of 49th Avenue from Flagler Street to 8th Street SW was renamed Special Agent Ariel Rios Ave. (M Res. 02-633) by the City of Miami.
