= Ariel Rios Federal Building =

Government building in Washington, D.C., United States

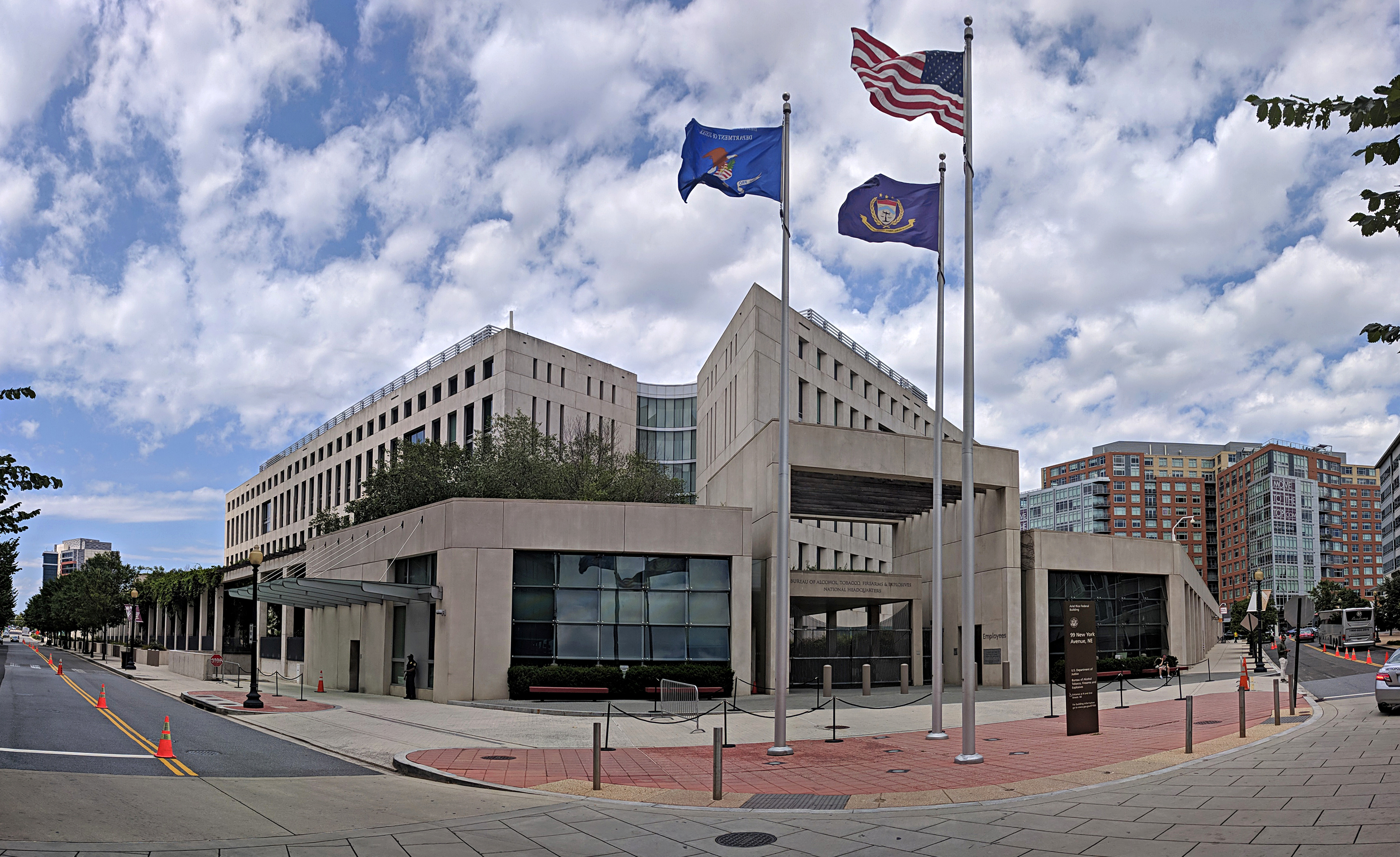
- The entrance to the Ariel Rios Federal Building across the street from the NoMa–Gallaudet U station of the Washington Metro in 2018

- Location within Central Washington, D.C.

General information
- Location: 99 New York Avenue NE, Washington, D.C., United States
- Coordinates: 38.90779°N 77.00494°W
- Current tenants: Bureau of Alcohol, Tobacco, Firearms and Explosives
- Construction started: 2002
- Completed: 2008
- Inaugurated: May 29, 2008
- Landlord: General Services Administration

Design and construction
- Architecture firm: Moshe Safdie and Associates

The Ariel Rios Federal Building, situated in the NoMa neighborhood of Washington, DC, is the headquarters of the United States Bureau of Alcohol, Tobacco, Firearms and Explosives (ATF) at 99 New York Avenue, NE. The building was completed in 2008, and in 2016 was named after Ariel Rios, an ATF undercover special agent who was killed in action in 1982.

An earlier bill was introduced in Congress proposing the building be named after Eliot Ness.

The name was previously used for the ATF's old headquarters at 1200 Pennsylvania Avenue, NW, which now houses the United States Environmental Protection Agency headquarters and has been renamed the William Jefferson Clinton Federal Building.

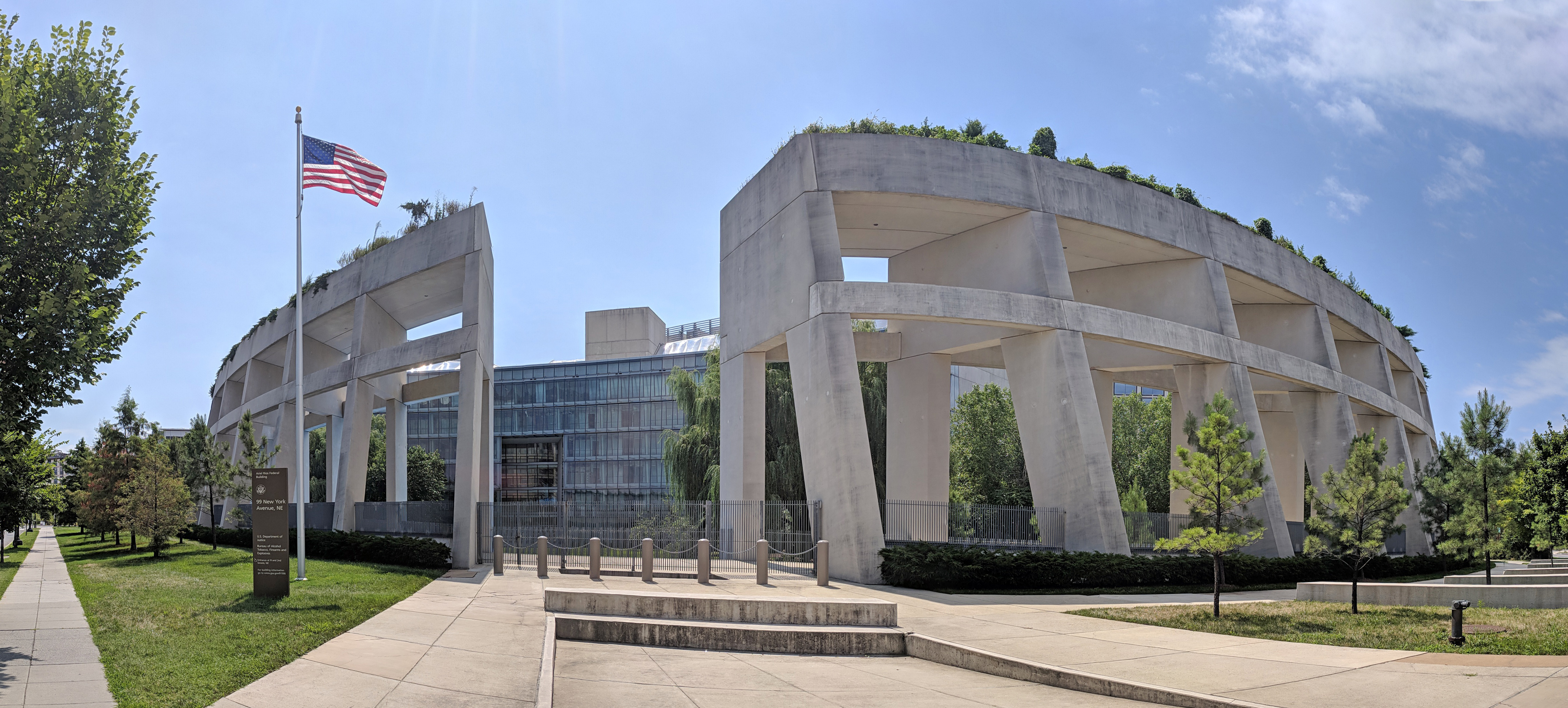
Panoramic view of the Ariel Rios Federal Building from New York Ave NE near First St NE
