= Department of Labor Building =

Building in Washington, D.C.

- U.S. Historic district – Contributing property
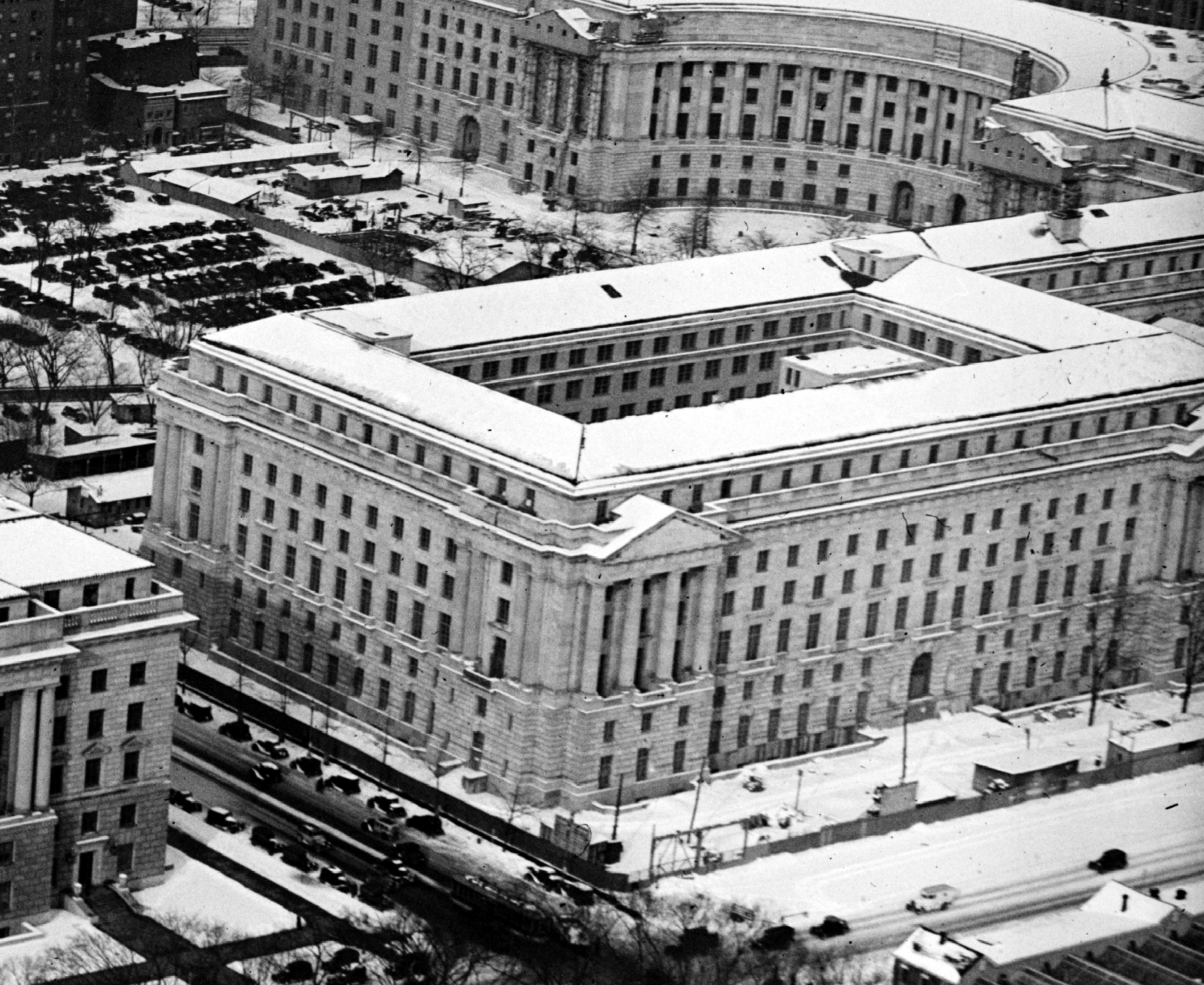
- The Department of Labor building with construction nearly complete in 1934

- Location within Washington, D.C.
- Location: 14th Street, and Constitution Avenue, NW; Washington, D.C.
- Coordinates: 38°53′32″N 77°1′51″W
- Built: 1934
- Architect: Arthur Brown, Jr.
- Architectural style: Classical Revival
- Part of: Pennsylvania Avenue National Historic Site (ID66000865)

The Department of Labor Building, also known as the William Jefferson Clinton Federal Building, is a historic office building, located at 14th Street, and Constitution Avenue, Northwest, Washington, D.C., in the Federal Triangle. It was the headquarters building for the United States Department of Labor from its opening until the 1970s. It later housed the U.S. Customs Service, and is currently occupied by the U.S. Environmental Protection Agency (EPA).

== History ==
Interior relief of the seal of the United States Department of Labor at the William Jefferson Clinton Federal Building

Arthur Brown, Jr. designed the building between 1928 and 1931, and construction was completed in 1934.

The building was constructed as part of the Federal Triangle development. Although plans to redevelop the slum Murder Bay had existed for decades, Congress did not fund the purchase of land or construction of buildings in the area until 1926. In July 1926, the government proposed building a Department of Labor Building between 13th and 14th Streets NW, on the north side of B Street NW (now Constitution Avenue NW). In March 1927, the government proposed adding a second building to the east (between 12th and 13th Streets NW) for "Independent Offices" (the building's purpose was later changed to be the headquarters of the Interstate Commerce Commission, or ICC). Design work proceeded slowly. In April 1930, President Herbert Hoover proposed building a $2 million "Departmental Auditorium" to connect the Labor and ICC buildings.

President Hoover laid the cornerstones for the Labor/ICC building on December 15, 1932. Freemasons trained in masonry assisted the President in laying the cornerstones. Hoover personally oversaw the dedication of the cornerstone at the Labor end of the building. His words were broadcast over loudspeaker to the workers at the ICC end of the structure, who placed the ICC cornerstone simultaneously at the President's instruction (becoming the first time in Washington history that a single person dedicated two cornerstones at the same time). William Green, President of the American Federation of Labor (AFL), attended the laying of the cornerstone for the Labor building.

The building was designated by Congress as a contributing structure to the Pennsylvania Avenue National Historic Site in 1966, and it was subsequently listed in the National Register of Historic Places.

== Agency occupants ==
The Department of Labor was the original occupant of the building. It vacated the building in 1979 when its employees moved to the Frances Perkins Building. The Customs Service took occupancy in 1979 and remained until the late 1990s, when it moved to the Ronald Reagan Building and International Trade Center. In 2002 EPA moved in, and the building was designated as the "EPA West" building.

In 2013 Congress designated the William Jefferson Clinton Federal Building as a complex including the EPA West Building, along with two adjacent buildings which were formerly known as the Interstate Commerce Commission Building (and subsequently designated as "EPA East") and the Ariel Rios Federal Building.

== See also ==
- Andrew W. Mellon Auditorium (Departmental Auditorium, renamed for Mellon in 1987)
