= Murder Bay =

Destroyed and rebuilt slum neighborhood in Washington D.C., United States

Coordinates: 38.893°N 77.03°W

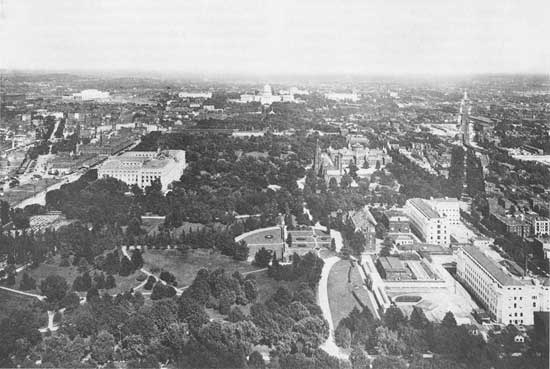
The National Mall, Washington, 1908. Murder Bay is visible at the far left

Murder Bay (also known as Hooker's Division) was a disreputable slum in Washington, D.C., roughly bounded by Constitution Avenue NW, Pennsylvania Avenue NW, and 13th and 15th Streets NW. The area was a center of crime until the early 20th century, with an extensive criminal underclass and prostitution occurring in several brothels and hotels in the area. The area was completely rebuilt during the construction of the Federal Triangle project in the late 1920s and 1930s.

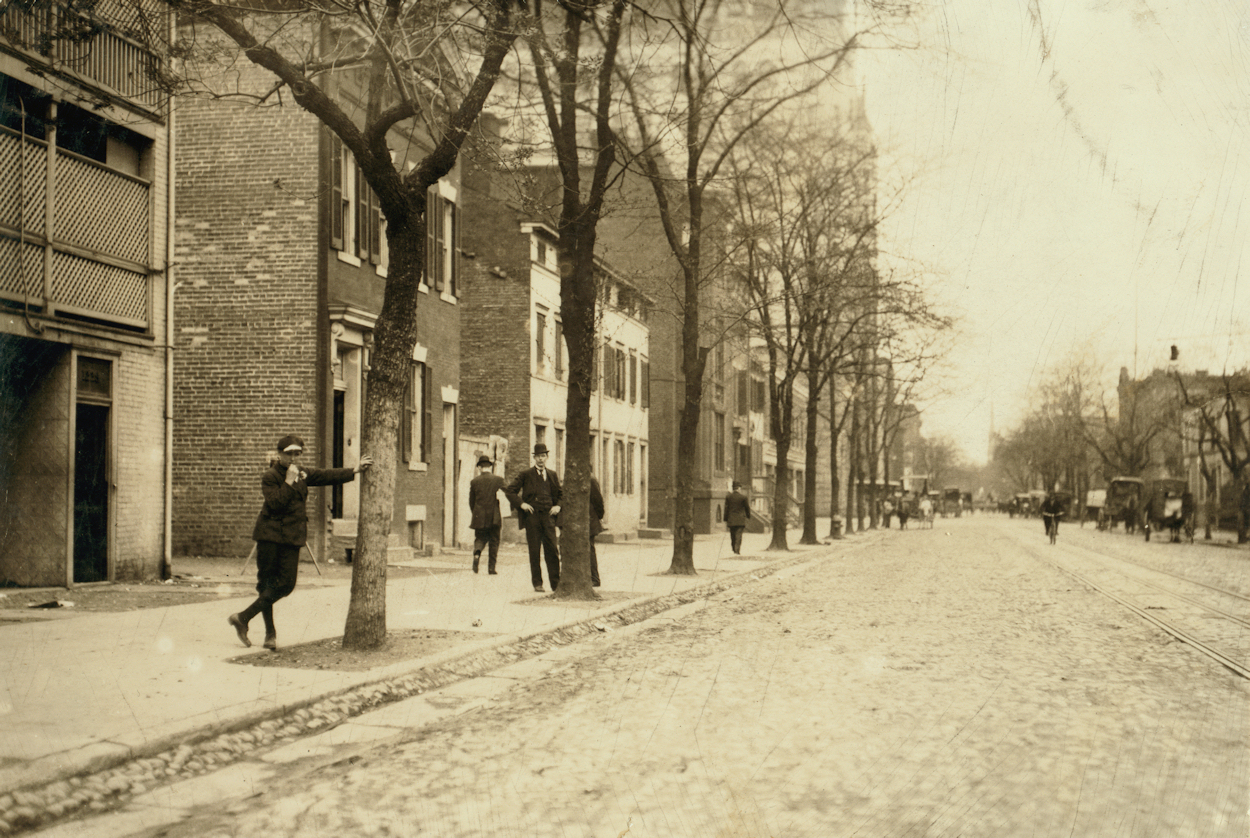
C Street NW near 13th Street NW in 1912: Known from the mid-1800s to the 1920s as "Murder Bay," this area was home to numerous brothels.

== History ==
In the 1860s, much of the area south of Pennsylvania Avenue and a few blocks east of the White House had become a disreputable slum known as Murder Bay, the home to an extensive criminal underclass and numerous brothels. During the American Civil War, so many prostitutes took up residence in Murder Bay to serve the needs of General Joseph Hooker's Army of the Potomac that the area became known as "Hooker's Division."

The two trapezoidal blocks sandwiched between Pennsylvania Avenue and Madison Drive, now the site of the National Gallery of Art, became home to such expensive brothels that it gained the nickname "Marble Alley." In the 1870s and 1880s, the avenue saw much competition between horse-drawn streetcar and chariot companies.

A large house known as Bull's Head existed at the rear of the hotel that is now Old Ebbitt Grill. The house marked the northwest corner of "Murder Bay". Bull's Head housed prostitutes and contained a large, lower-class gambling den.

In the late 1890s, the Electric Vehicle Company established a circular showroom and service center at 15th Street NW and Ohio Avenue.

== Demolition and redevelopment ==
=== Federal Triangle ===
In the mid-1910s, the federal government acquired land on Pennsylvania Avenue between 14th and 15th Streets and several blocks south, but no demolition or construction was conducted. In the 1920s, the government began planning the redevelopment of the Murder Bay area. This became a major construction project of 10 large city and federal office buildings, which would eventually be called Federal Triangle.

The entire Murder Bay area was replaced with government and other commercial buildings. In 1926, a contract was issued for razing several buildings along Constitution Avenue to make way for the new Internal Revenue Service Building. In 1927, Congress began to appropriate funds for additional land acquisition. The land purchases took several years to complete.

In the late 1920s, construction of additional buildings began, with completion nearly complete by 1931. In 1932, the Department of Commerce Building opened. In 1935, the Department of Justice, Department of Labor, Interstate Commerce Commission and National Archives buildings opened.

=== Pennsylvania Avenue National Historic Site ===
On March 25, 1965, President Lyndon Johnson issued Executive Order No. 11210, which established the Temporary Commission on Pennsylvania Avenue. The Pennsylvania Avenue National Historic Site was established on September 30, 1965, and culturally, aesthetically, and historically significant structures and places were given historic status protection.
