= Pacific Gas and Electric Company General Office Building and Annex =

- U.S. National Register of Historic Places
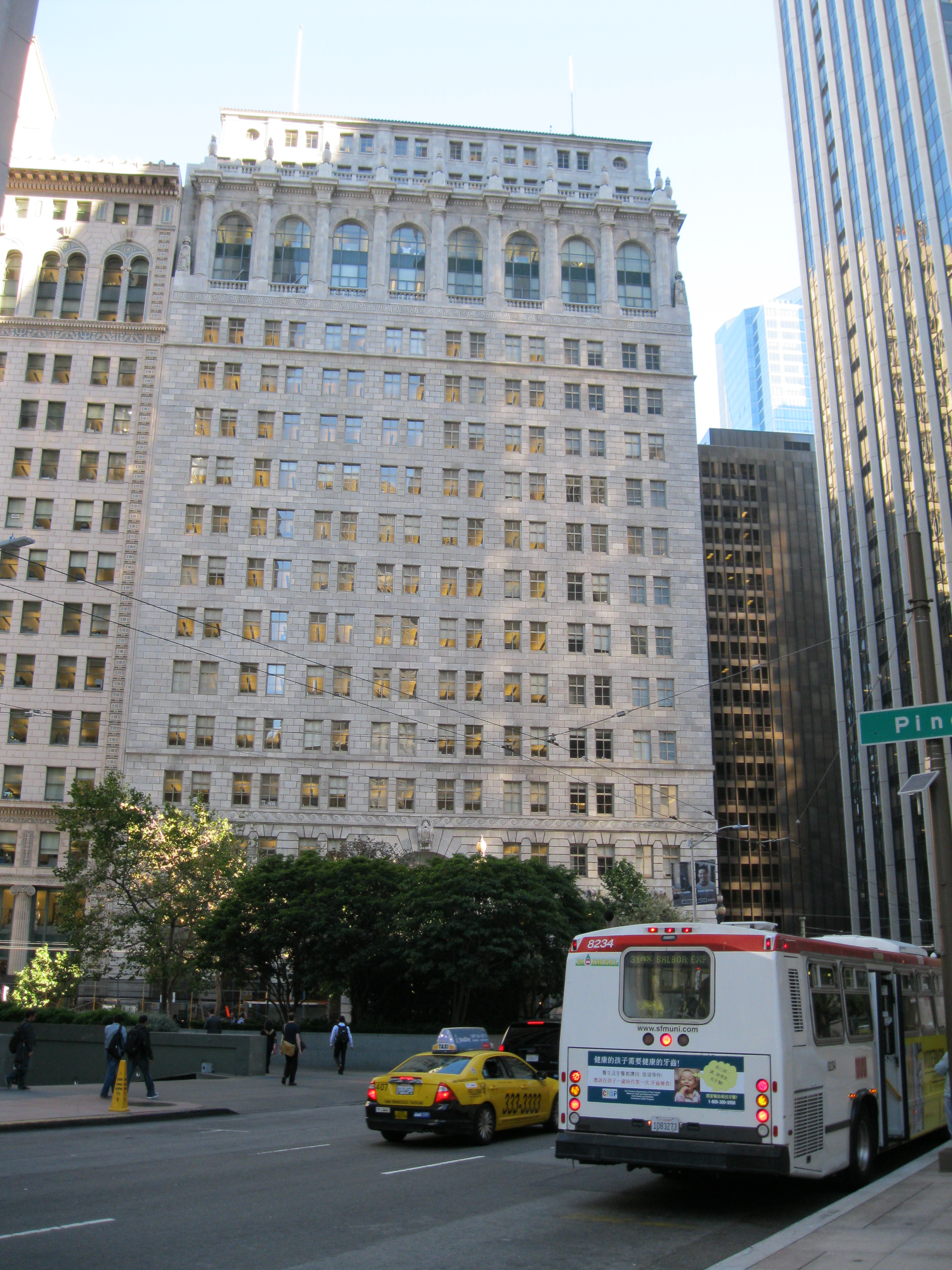

- Location within San Francisco County Location within California Location within the United States
- Location: 245 Market St., San Francisco, California
- Coordinates: 37°47′33″N 122°23′44″W
- Area: less than one acre
- Built: 1923-25; 1945
- Architects: Bakewell & Brown
- Architectural style: Beaux Arts
- NRHP reference No.: 95001385
- Added to NRHP: November 29, 1995

The Pacific Gas and Electric Company General Office Building and Annex is a historic office building located at 245 Market St. in San Francisco, California. The building was constructed in 1923–25 to serve as the Pacific Gas and Electric Company headquarters. Architects Bakewell & Brown designed the Beaux-Arts building. The seventeen-story building features an arcaded lower section on the first two stories, a plain vertical shaft, and multiple setbacks at the top four stories. The entire exterior is clad in terra cotta, which is also used to decorate the lower and upper sections. The building's design complements the neighboring Matson Building.

Pacific Gas and Electric began a major expansion period shortly after constructing their headquarters, and they absorbed several other power companies in northern and central California. While business declined during the Great Depression, the company rebounded during World War II, and then needed more space in its headquarters. In 1945 the company built an annex to the building; the annex, which is interconnected with the original building, was designed to match the original building's architecture.

The building was added to the National Register of Historic Places on November 29, 1995.

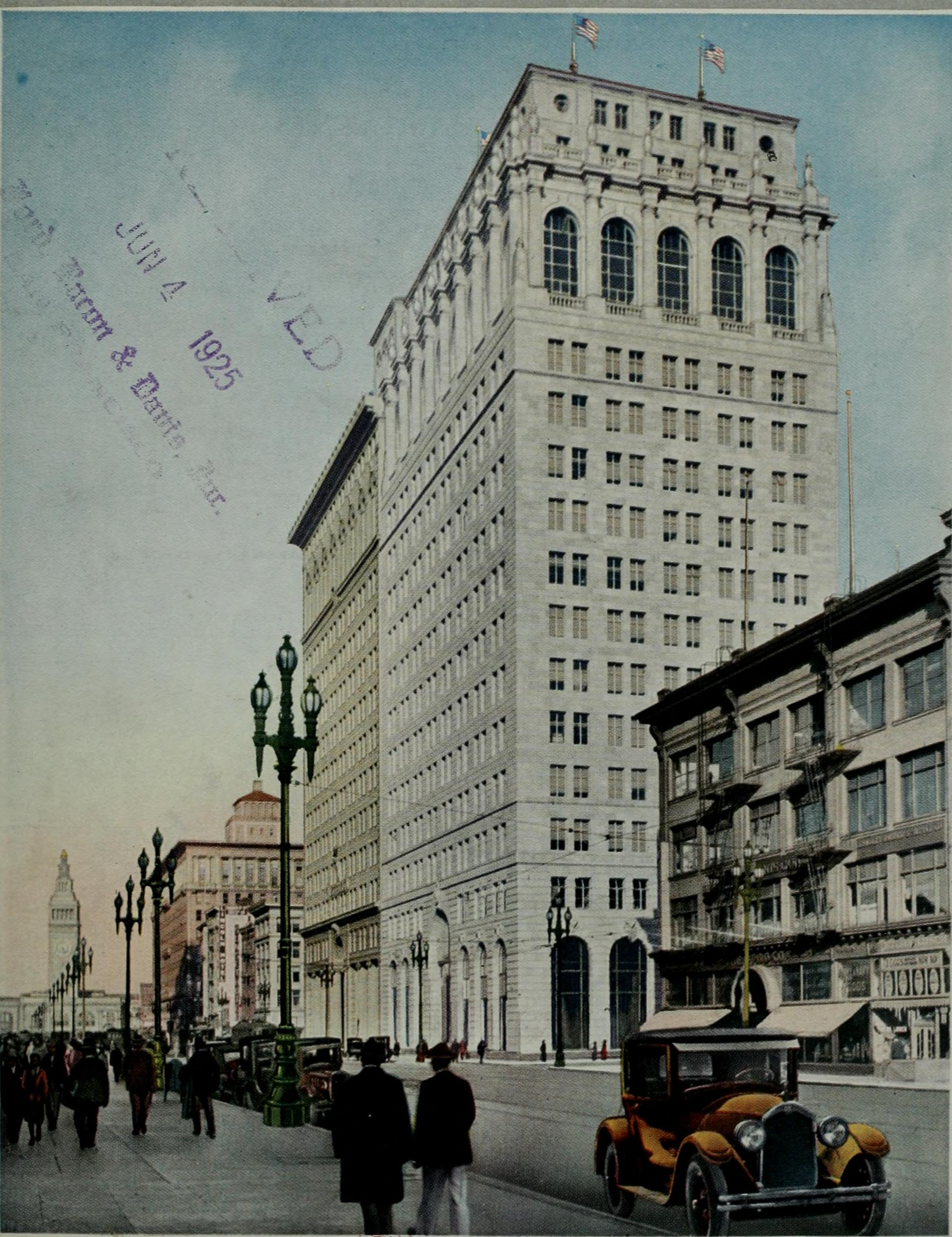
Pacific Gas and Electric Company's General Office Building, c. 1924-5

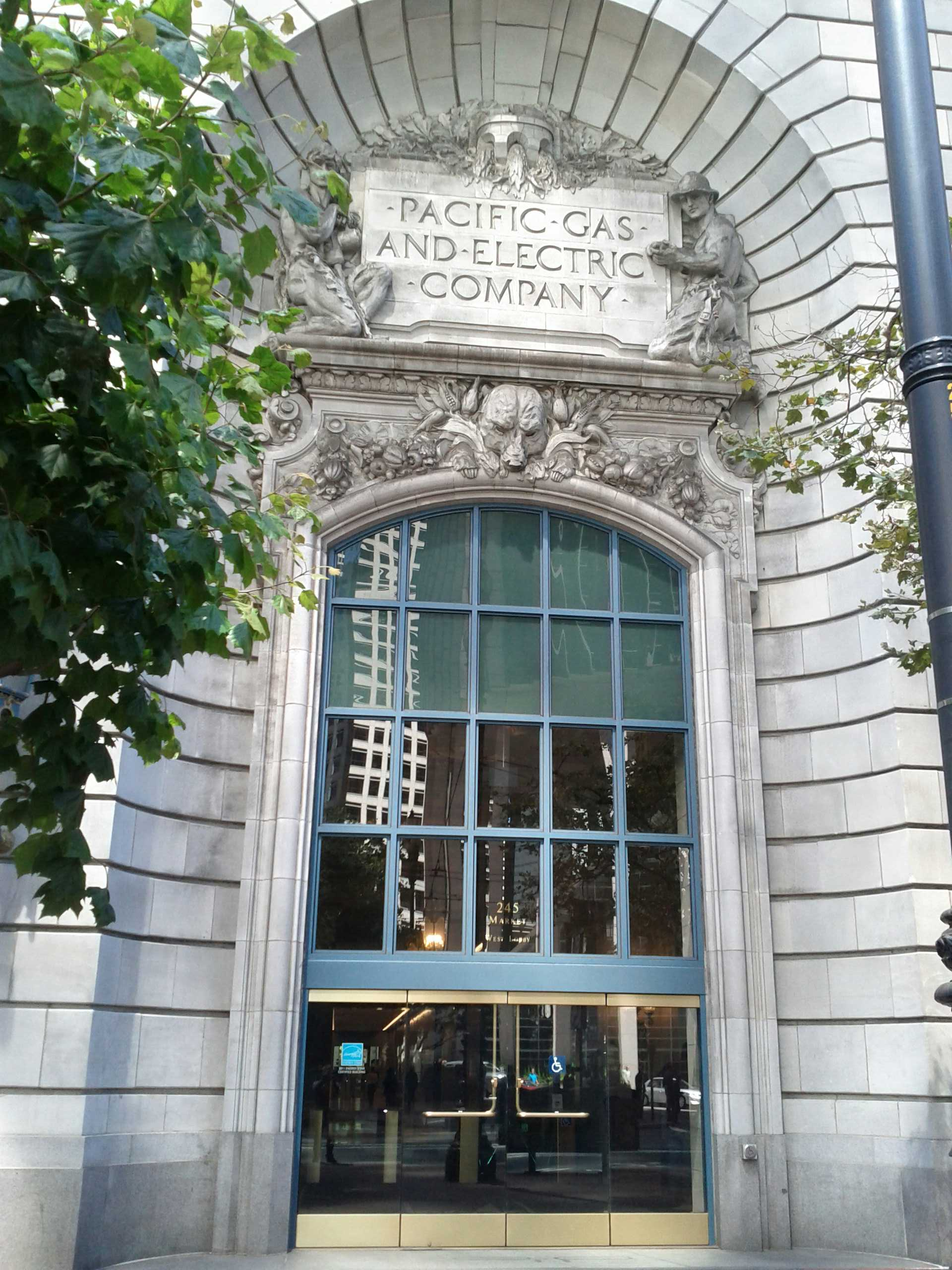
Entrance to the building

== See also ==
- Pacific Gas & Electric Building
- Historic details of building construction (before annex added)
