= Alexander Robey Shepherd =

American politician

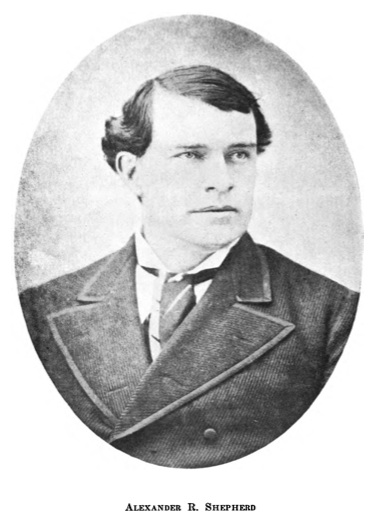
- Shepherd in 1874

2nd Governor of the District of Columbia
- In office September 13, 1873 – June 20, 1874
- Preceded by: Henry D. Cooke
- Succeeded by: None (office abolished); William Dennison (as President of the Board of Commissioners)

Personal details
- Born: January 30, 1835 Washington, D.C., U.S.
- Died: September 12, 1902 (aged 67) Batopilas, Mexico
- Resting place: Rock Creek Cemetery; Washington, D.C., U.S.
- Party: Republican

Alexander Robey Shepherd (January 30, 1835 – September 12, 1902), also known as Boss Shepherd, was an American politician and businessman who was the 2nd Governor of the District of Columbia from 1873 to 1874. He was one of the most controversial and influential civic leaders in the history of Washington, D.C., and one of the most powerful big-city political bosses of the Gilded Age. He was also head of the District of Columbia Department of Public Works from 1871 to 1873. He is known, particularly in Washington, as "The Father of Modern Washington."

== Early life ==
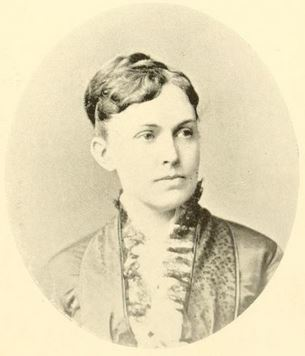
Mary Grice Young, who Shepherd married in 1861

Shepherd was born in Southwest Washington, D.C., on January 30, 1835. He dropped out of school at age 13.

== Career ==
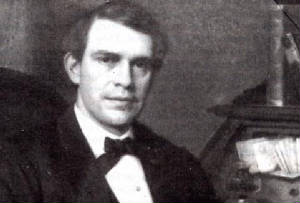
Shepherd, c. 1864

After dropping out of school, Shepherd took a job as a plumber's assistant, eventually working his way up to becoming the owner of the plumbing firm. He then invested the profits from that firm in real estate development, which made him a wealthy socialite and influential citizen of the city. One of his luxurious properties was Shepherd's Row, a set of rowhouses on Connecticut Avenue designed by Adolf Cluss; Cluss was later the star witness at Shepherd's congressional investigation hearings.

=== American Civil War ===
Two days after the Battle of Fort Sumter that initiated the American Civil War, Shepherd and his brother each enlisted in the 3rd Battalion of the District of Columbia volunteers. The term of enlistment at that time was only three months, after which Shepherd was honorably discharged. On January 30, 1861, he was married to Mary Grice Young, with whom he raised seven children. Her niece, Marie Grice Young, was the piano teacher of Theodore Roosevelt's children and a Titanic survivor.

=== Government of Washington, D.C. ===
He was an early member of the Republican Party and a member of the Washington City Councils from 1861 to 1871, during which time he was an important voice for D.C. emancipation, then for suffrage for the freed slaves. Frederick Douglass later said, "I want to thank Governor Shepherd for the fair way in which he treated the colored race when he was in a position to help them."

By 1870, war and mismanagement had caused the finances and infrastructure of the city to deteriorate so badly that the Mayor of Washington, Sayles J. Bowen, had his furniture seized in an attempt to pay the city's debts. Democrats and Republicans were in a rare agreement that a drastic change was needed from Bowen's regime. As a solution, Shepherd and his allies began agitation for the abolition of the elected governments of Washington City and Georgetown, as well as the appointed justices of the peace for Washington County, to be replaced with a unified territorial government to administer the entire District of Columbia. The Shepherd machine was easily able to sway popular support in favor of that notion.

In 1871, Shepherd was able to convince Congress to pass a bill that established the territorial government that he desired. The Organic Act of 1871 merged the various governments in the District of Columbia into a single eleven-member legislature, including two representatives for Georgetown and two for the County of Washington, to be presided over by a territorial governor. The legislature and governor would all be appointed by the President. Both frontrunners for the governorship were initially Shepherd, from Washington, and Colonel Jason A. Magruder, from Georgetown; although popular support was behind Shepherd, US President Ulysses S. Grant feared that either appointment would cause a sectional divide that might make governorship of the full district impossible. Thus, Grant's inaugural appointment to the governorship was his friend, the financier Henry D. Cooke, "a gentleman of unimpeachable integrity" and secretly a close political ally of Shepherd.

Shepherd was appointed vice-chair of the city's five-man Board of Public Works. The most powerful public entity in the District of Columbia, the Board of Public Works was actually an independent entity from the territorial government, reporting directly to Congress, but kept within the territory's sphere of influence by making the governor its chairman. Cooke, however, rarely attended the Board's meetings (probably at Shepherd's urging), allowing Vice-Chair Shepherd to preside. He asserted himself as a leader to such an extent that he often did not bother to consult the other members of the Board before he made decisions and took sweeping action. His abilities as a political operator, according to D.C. journalist Sam Smith, were formidable:

Boss Shepherd's persuasive skills were such that upon being called to account by the president of a railroad whose tracks on the Mall had been torn up one night by 200 of Shepherd's men, he left the meeting with an offer to become the line's vice president. His cunning was such that when he heard reports of a planned injunction against the removal of what he called a "wretched old market building" on Mt. Vernon Square, he got a friend to take the one judge currently in the city out for a long ride in the country while the Boss accomplished his mission.... As The Cincinnati Enquirer of the time put it: "Boss Tweed and his gang, to whom Shepherd's enemies are so given to comparing him, were vulgar villians [sic], stupid sneak thieves, by the side of this remarkable man."

==== City improvements ====
The warworn condition of Washington City in the late 1860s and the early 1870s, when it was little more than a hamlet of dirt roads, wooden sidewalks and open sewers and surrounded by farmland and large country estates, was such that Congress had for several years discussed relocating the seat of the Federal government westward to St. Louis, which would have led to ruin for the District of Columbia. Shepherd believed that if the government was to remain in Washington, the city's infrastructure and facilities had to be modernized and revitalized. He filled in the long-dormant Washington Canal and placed 157 miles (253 km) of paved roads and sidewalks, 123 miles (198 km) of sewers, 39 miles (63 km) of gas mains, and 30 miles (48 km) of water mains. In 1872, Shepherd was responsible for the demolition of the Northern Liberties Market. Two individuals, a butcher who was still on the premises at the time of the demolition and a young boy who had come with his dog to chase the rats who fled the structure, were killed in the process. Under his direction, the city also planted 60,000 trees, built the city's first public transportation system in the form of horse-drawn streetcars, installed street lights, and had the railroad companies refit their tracks to fit new citywide grading standards for the District.

==== Governorship and fall from power ====
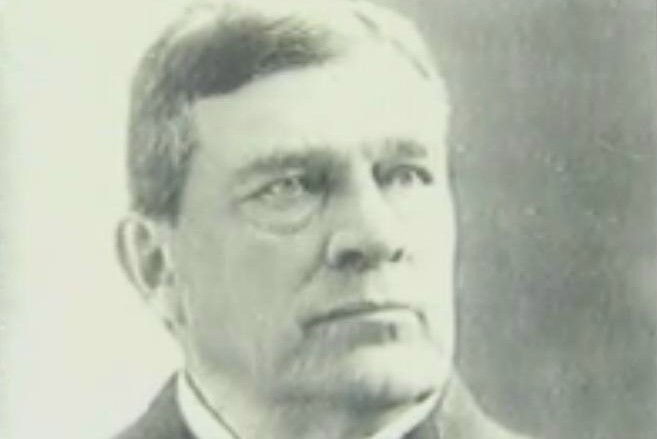
Shepherd later in 1873

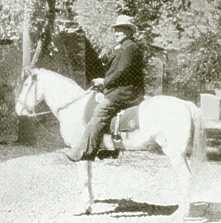
Shepherd on horseback in Batopilas, Chihuahua, Mexico, in 1885

In 1873, Mary Clemmer Ames wrote that, "the majority of people believe that Governor Cooke would retain his position only until the fusion of irritated factions, including whites and blacks, Washington, Georgetown, and Washington County, was effected, and that in the event of his resignation, Mr. Shepherd would be appointed his successor. Whether Governor Cooke retires before the end of his term or not, it is the universal belief that Mr. Shepherd will be the second governor of the District of Columbia." Sure enough, that September, Cooke resigned as Governor of the District and Shepherd, having befriended Grant, was promoted by the President to the governorship.

Once in office, Governor Shepherd engaged in a series of social reforms and campaigns that were progressive even by Radical Republican standards. He "integrated public schools, supported the vote for women, sought representation for D.C. in Congress and a Federal payment to the city." Generally, however, his gubernatorial term was "principally occupied in avoiding embarrassments in the conduct of the District's official business due to the inadequacy of the revenue which had been entailed by the demands for funds to meet the cost of executing street improvements."

However, despite the lack of finances, the massive public works project continued and intensified during Shepherd's term as governor of the District of Columbia. Although the Organic Act of 1871 had given the governor power to issue construction bonds in the city to the consternation of white landowners, but Shepherd put it to a referendum to demonstrate his widespread popular support in the city thanks to the black voters, who backed him.

The cost of the modifications was excessive. Initially, Shepherd had estimated them at a $6.25 million budget, but by 1874, costs had ballooned to $9 million, despite the national Panic of 1873. District residents gathered 1,200 signatures to petition an audit from Congress; when the audit was conducted, the legislature discovered that the city was in arrears by $13 million and declared bankruptcy on its behalf. Shepherd was investigated for financial misappropriation and mishandling, and it was discovered that the project and its funding had been carried to absurd extremes. Shepherd had raised taxes to such a degree that citizens had to sell their own property to pay them. Street grading had been executed such that some homes' front yards were as much as 15 feet (4.6 m) lower than the front door, and others found their homes standing in trenches with the street at the second-floor. In addition, Congress discovered that Shepherd had given preference to neighborhoods and areas of the District in which he or his political cronies held financial interests.

Although none of his actions was found to have violated any laws, the territorial government was abolished in favor of a three-member Board of Commissioners, which remained in charge of the city for nearly a century. Although Grant nominated Shepherd to the first Board of Commissioners, the appointment was rejected by the US Senate on the same day. The appointment of Shepherd became one of the many corruption scandals surrounding Grant's administration.

The civic improvements, however, had sufficiently modernized the city that relocation of the capital was never again discussed as a serious option. It also created a decades-long real estate boom in Washington (until about the turn of the 20th century), with wealthy Americans coming from all over the United States to build large and expensive mansions, some for year-round residency and some for winter vacation only (leading Washington to be called "the winter Newport").

Shepherd remained in Washington, D.C. for a further two years, still a real-estate magnate and a celebrated and influential member of the city's society. In 1876, however, he declared personal bankruptcy and, once his accounts were settled, moved with his family to Batopilas, Mexico, where he made a fortune in silver mining and instituted many of the same reforms he had championed in the District of Columbia.

== Death ==
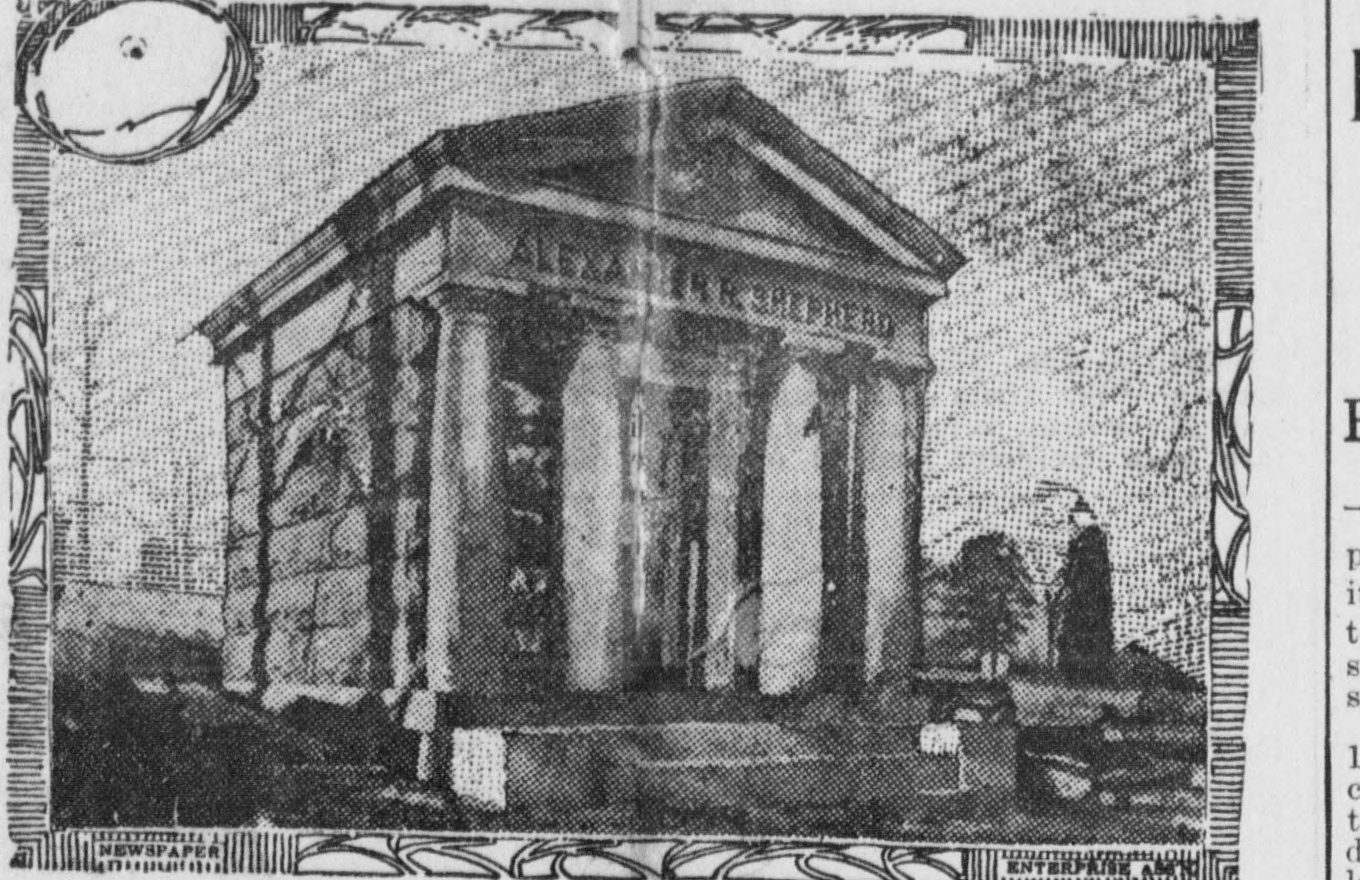
A 1904 illustration of Shepherd's tomb in Rock Creek Cemetery in Washington, D.C.

Shephered died in Batopilas in Mexico, on September 12, 1902, from complications of a surgery to remove his appendix. His body was returned to Washington and buried in a large personal (not family) vault in Rock Creek Cemetery.

== Legacy ==
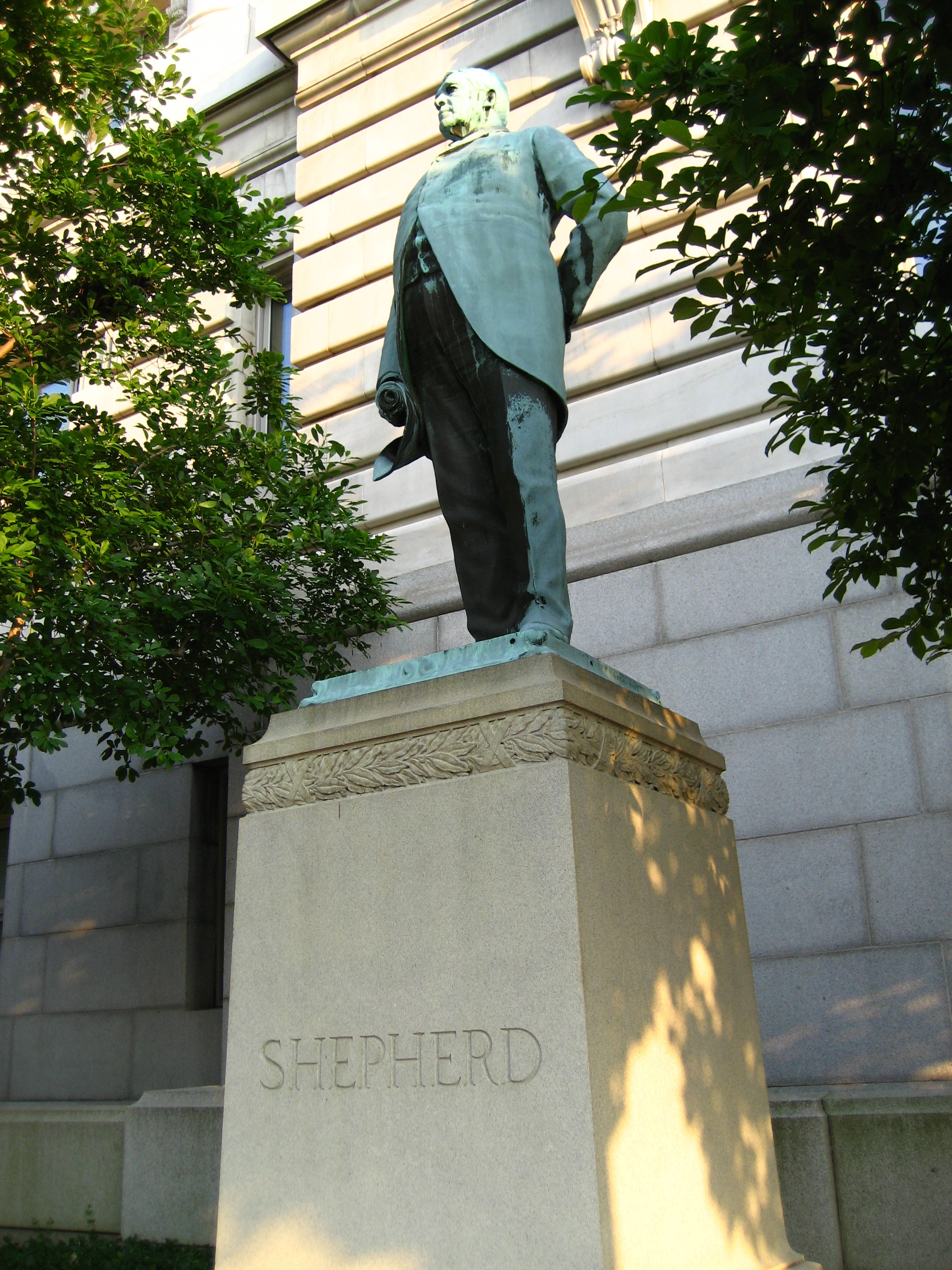
Alexander Robey Shepherd, a statue erected in Shepherd's outside the John A. Wilson Building in Washington, D.C.

Shepherd's legacy has been a matter of some debate since his death more than one hundred years ago. He has long been maligned as a corrupt, cronyist political boss, often compared to Boss Tweed, the leader of the Tammany Hall political machine of the same time period.

A statue of Shepherd currently stands on Pennsylvania Avenue, NW, in front of the John A. Wilson Building, which now houses the offices and chambers of the Council and the Mayor of the District of Columbia), and has served as a symbol of his fluctuating reputation.

In 1979, during the first year of Mayor Marion Barry's administration, the statue was removed from its perch on Pennsylvania Avenue and warehoused in city storage. It reappeared in the mid-1980s near an otherwise-obscure D.C. Public Works building on Shepherd Avenue, S.W., in the District's remote Blue Plains neighborhood.

Near the beginning of the 21st century, Washington historian Nelson Rimensnyder started to argue for a restoration of Shepherd's reputation, calling him an "urban visionary" who single-handedly transformed Washington into a major American city and championed aggressive social reform.

Largely as a result of the efforts of Rimensnyder and those he persuaded, the Shepherd statue was returned in January 2005 to its previous place of honor. The statue now stands on its pedestal next to the sidewalk of Pennsylvania Avenue, NW, close to 14th Street, NW, and the northwest corner of the Wilson Building.

The D.C. neighborhood of Shepherd Park, where Shepherd once lived, is named for him, as is Alexander Shepherd Elementary School in that neighborhood.

Political offices
Preceded by Henry D. Cooke	Governor of the District of Columbia; 1873–1874	Succeeded by William Dennison as President of the D.C. Board of Commissioners
