= Pennsylvania Avenue National Historic Site =

US National Historic Site in Washington, D.C.

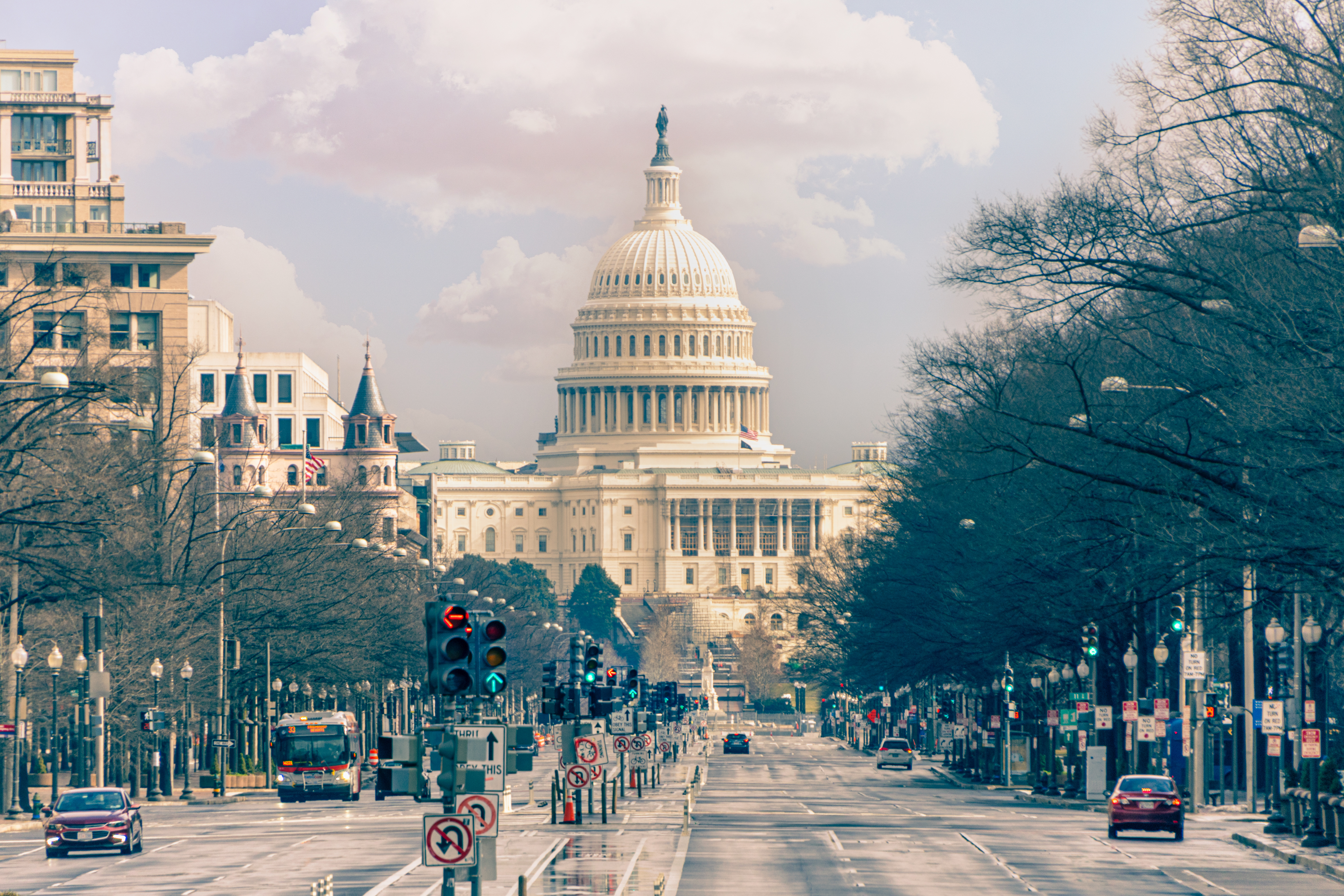
- Pennsylvania Avenue N.W. in 2021 facing the United States Capitol (background)

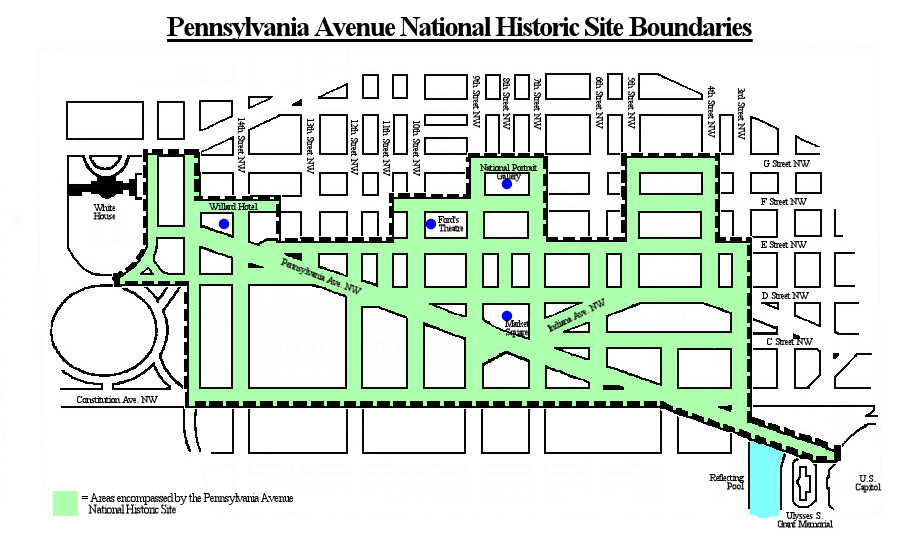
- Location: Washington, D.C., U.S.
- Coordinates: 38°53′37″N 77°01′26″W
- Area: 20.6 acres (8.3 ha)
- Established: September 30, 1965
- Governing body: National Park Service, U.S. Dept. of the Interior
- Website: Pennsylvania Avenue National Historic Site
- Pennsylvania Avenue National Historic Site
- U.S. National Register of Historic Places
- NRHP reference No.: 66000865
- Added to NRHP: October 15, 1966

Pennsylvania Avenue National Historic Site is a National Historic Site in the city of Washington, D.C. Established on September 30, 1965, the site is roughly bounded by Constitution Avenue, 15th Street NW, F Street NW, and 3rd Street NW. The historic district includes a number of culturally, aesthetically, and historically significant structures and places, including Pennsylvania Avenue NW from the White House to the United States Capitol, the Treasury Building, Freedom Plaza, Federal Triangle, Ford's Theatre, the Old Patent Office Building, the Old Pension Office Building, which now houses the National Building Museum, Judiciary Square, and the Peace Monument.

Pennsylvania Avenue, the heart of the historic site, is sometimes called "America's Main Street", and the avenue plays a significant part in American political culture. A march or event held on the avenue is infused with a great deal of political meaning.

== History of the site ==
=== Construction of Pennsylvania Avenue ===
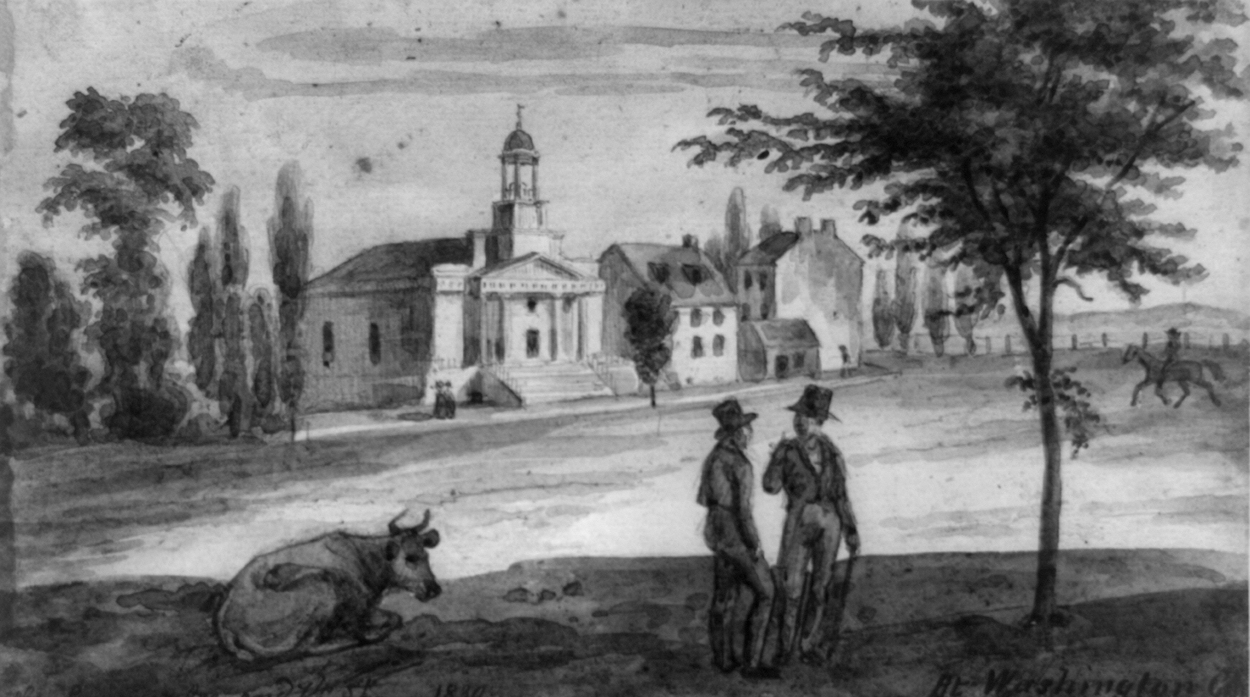
Pennsylvania Avenue and 7th Street in 1839 with the First Unitarian Church on the northeast corner of 6th Street and Pennsylvania Avenue visible in the background

Prior to the settlement of the area by European colonists, the Piscataway tribe of Native Americans occupied the northeastern banks of the Potomac River, although no permanent settlements are known in the area now encompassed by the city of Washington. As the region began to be settled, David Burnes obtained the first title to the area which would become Pennsylvania Avenue NW in 1774.

Article One, Section 8, of the United States Constitution established a "District... [to] become the seat of the government of the United States..." The Residence Act of 1790 (as amended), established this district and gave to the President of the United States the authority to fix the location of the site somewhere along the Potomac River. President George Washington chose the current site of the city in 1791, and it was surveyed later that year. At the time, it was not foreseen that the city of Washington would be coterminous with the District of Columbia, and Washington set the northern boundary of the city roughly where Pennsylvania Avenue is today. Washington chose Pierre (Peter) Charles L'Enfant to plan the new city. Although unnamed at the time, Pennsylvania Avenue was designed in the L'Enfant plan as a critical thoroughfare for bringing existing roads into the heart of the new city. It was also designed to link the "president's palace" with the Capitol building planned for Jenkin's Hill (now Capitol Hill).

Pennsylvania Avenue was created on April 14, 1792, when the three commissioners then overseeing the District of Columbia ordered "the middle of the avenue from the president's palace to the capitol" cleared. The origin of the name "Pennsylvania Avenue" is somewhat obscure. The name was first applied to the avenue in a letter from surveyor and map-maker Benjamin Ellicott to the District's commissioners in December 1791.

The actual clearing of Pennsylvania Avenue did not begin until spring 1796. Much of Pennsylvania Avenue below 9th Street was swampy and nearly unusable, as Tiber Creek curved north to border the avenue at 9th Street and again at 5th and 4th Streets before actually crossing it at 2nd Street. The damp earned the street the nickname of the "Great Serbonian Bog." (This marshy area was filled in and dried beginning in 1816.) In the fall of 1800, Pennsylvania Avenue was cleared of underbrush, and a 6-foot-wide (1.8 m) raised footpath covered in stone chips was built. A stone bridge over Tiber Creek at 2nd Street was also built during this time, being replaced by a brick arch in 1817. On March 3, 1803, President Thomas Jefferson ordered that Pennsylvania Avenue be widened and the road completed. Benjamin Henry Latrobe, the architect newly hired to supervise the avenue's reconstruction, built three lanes separated by four rows of Black Poplars.

Additional improvements to the street were made throughout the 19th century: The avenue was macadamized in 1832 (and the poplars removed), repaved with round stones in 1852, and repaved with wooden blocks from 1st to 15th Streets in 1870. The wooden blocks required such extensive repair, however, that between 1876 and 1877 they were replaced with rock from 1st to 6th Streets NW, and with grahamite asphalt from 6th to 15th Streets NW. The avenue was repaved in 1890 and again in 1907.

=== Growing development of the Pennsylvania Avenue district ===
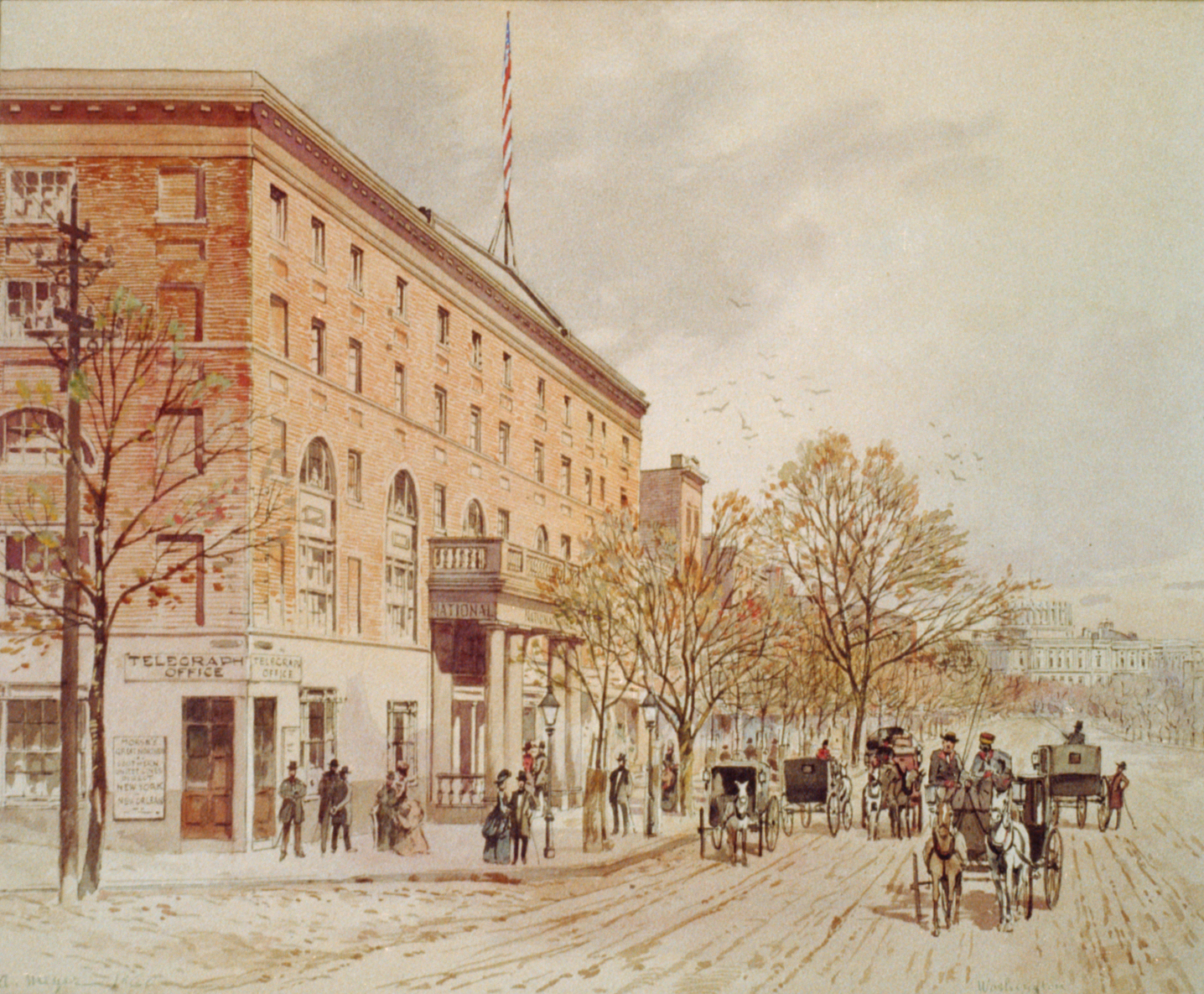
An 1860 watercolor of Pennsylvania Avenue at 6th Street with the not yet finished United States Capitol in the distance and the National Hotel on the left

The Pennsylvania Avenue area of the city saw limited growth prior to the 1850s, although a number of firsts also occurred in the area. James Greenleaf, an early land speculator in the city, erected the first buildings, including six row houses, on Pennsylvania Avenue in the spring and summer of 1794 at the corner of Pennsylvania Avenue NW and 22nd Street NW, and another seven similar buildings were erected about the same time by Walter Stewart, a Continental Army general during the American Revolutionary War. The "Six Buildings" erected by Greenleaf served as the first headquarters of the United States Department of State and the United States Department of the Navy in 1800, while one of the buildings across the street housed the United States Department of War. Two of the city's first three street lamps were established in the area near Capitol Hill in December 1801.

Center Market, the city's first food market, was built the same year on a lot on the south side of Pennsylvania Avenue between 7th and 8th Streets. It became the hub of the city's early commercial district. Over time, the business district moved north, but its southern boundary continued to be marked by Pennsylvania Avenue. Center Market moved a block west along Pennsylvania Avenue to larger, more modern facilities in 1872. The second inauguration of Thomas Jefferson, which occurred on March 4, 1805, was the first to host an inaugural procession down Pennsylvania Avenue.

The city's first school, the Western School, opened on the south side of Pennsylvania Avenue between 17th and 18th Streets NW in January 1806. The city's first sewer pipe was laid under Pennsylvania Avenue in 1829. By 1835, Pennsylvania Avenue was largely lined by two- to four-story Federalist row houses. The Baltimore and Ohio Railroad converted a house at the corner of 2nd Street NW and Pennsylvania Avenue into the city's first train station. It was abandoned in 1851 when the station moved to a more long-lasting location at New Jersey Avenue and C Street NW. The same year, the National Theatre opened on December 7. It was followed by the 400-seat Odeon in 1846, the 1,000-seat Adelphi in 1847, and Metzerott Hall in the 1860s. President Andrew Jackson approved the construction of the Treasury Building in 1836 (it was completed the following year), but the size and height of the building forced a rerouting of Pennsylvania Avenue and blocked the view of the White House from L'Enfant's "Grand Avenue." The city's first stock brokerage was opened by William W. Corcoran at 15th and Pennsylvania Avenue in 1837. The city blocks where the National Gallery of Art now stands became a fashionable residential area in the 1830s.

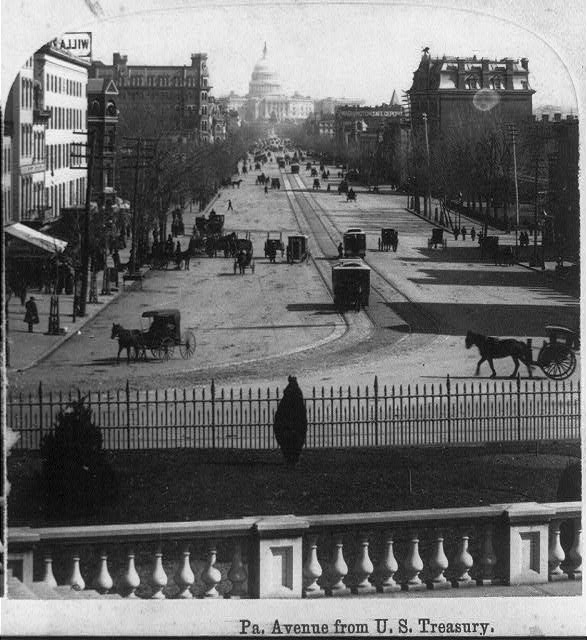
Horsecars on Pennsylvania Avenue around 1880

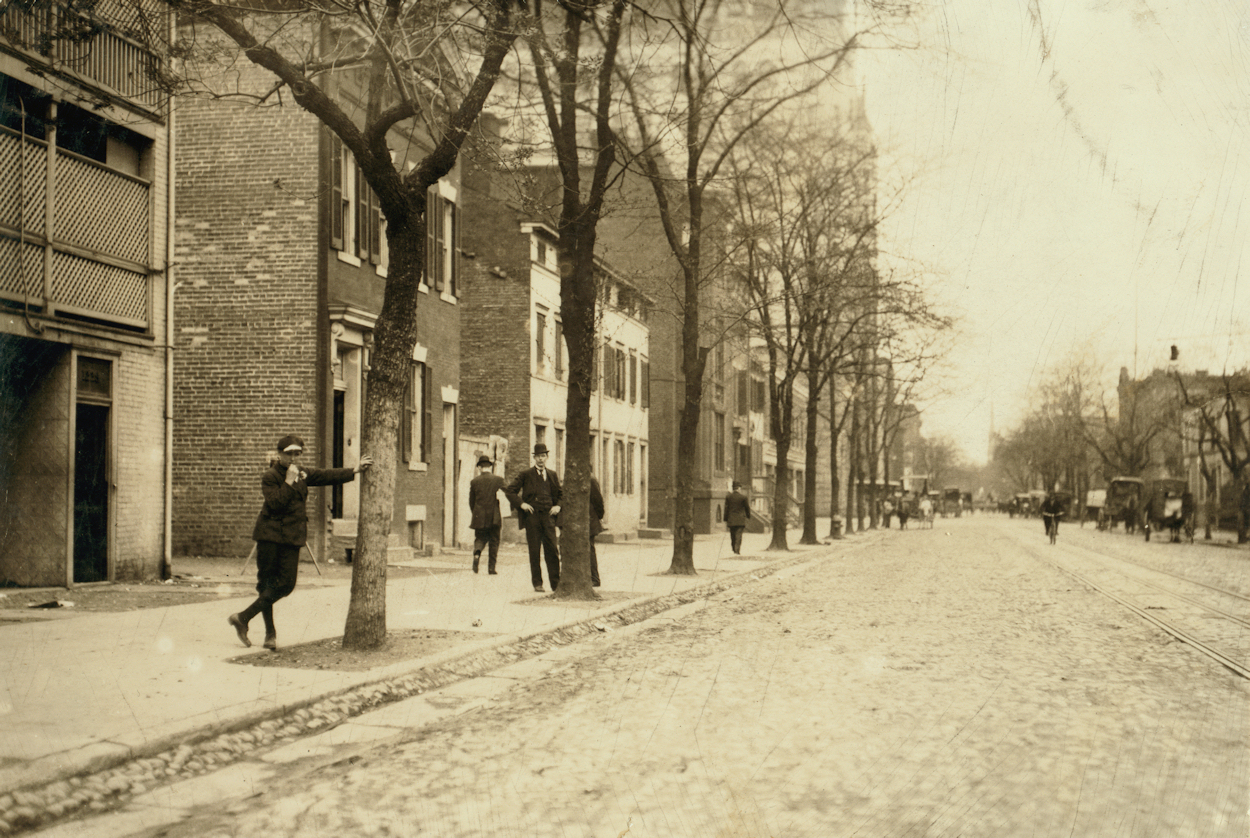
C Street NW near 13th Street NW in 1912: Known from the mid-1800s to the 1920s as "Murder Bay," this area was home to numerous brothels.

In the 1860s, the area saw significant deterioration despite continuing improvements to Pennsylvania Avenue itself. Pennsylvania Avenue was lit with coal gas streetlights in 1851. The avenue was one of the few fully lit streets in the entire city of Washington. In July 1862, a horse-drawn trolley line was built along the street between the Capitol and White House. But despite these many improvements, much of the Pennsylvania Avenue Historic Site south of Pennsylvania Avenue had become a disreputable slum known as Murder Bay, the home to an extensive criminal underclass and numerous brothels. During the American Civil War, so many prostitutes took up residence in Murder Bay to serve the needs of General Joseph Hooker's Army of the Potomac that the area became known as "Hooker's Division." The two trapezoidal blocks sandwiched between Pennsylvania and Missouri Avenues (now the site of the National Gallery of Art) became home to such expensive brothels that it gained the nickname "Marble Alley." In the 1870s and 1880s, the avenue was the site of significant competition between horse-drawn streetcar and chariot companies. Pennsylvania Avenue saw its first electric streetlights give light on October 14, 1881. A small number of additional lights north of the avenue along 10th Street NW were lit later that month.

The southern part of the Pennsylvania Avenue district was flooded many times in the last three decades of the 19th century. Major floods occurred in October 1870 (during which Chain Bridge was destroyed), February 1881, November 1887, and June 1889 (the same storm which caused the Johnstown Flood). Floodwaters were high enough that rowboats were used on the avenue, and horse-drawn streetcars saw water reach the bottom of the trams.

Washington's first Chinatown emerged on the northern edge of the Murder Bay section of the historic site. D.C.'s Chinatown was established in 1884, although Chinese and other Asian immigrants began moving into the area in noticeable numbers as early as 1880. This Chinatown existed along the south side of Pennsylvania Avenue between 4th and 7th Streets, with the heaviest concentration of residences and businesses near the Center Market site where 4th Street, C Street, and Pennsylvania Avenue met. This Chinatown existed as a vibrant community until 1935, when the construction of the National Archives Building and the Apex Building (which houses the Federal Trade Commission) forced the Chinatown to move to its current location on H Street NW.

Although the area south of Pennsylvania Avenue NW was notorious for its crime and brothels, an 1892 guide book to the city recommended Pennsylvania Avenue and the surrounding streets as one of the few sites to see in Washington, D.C.

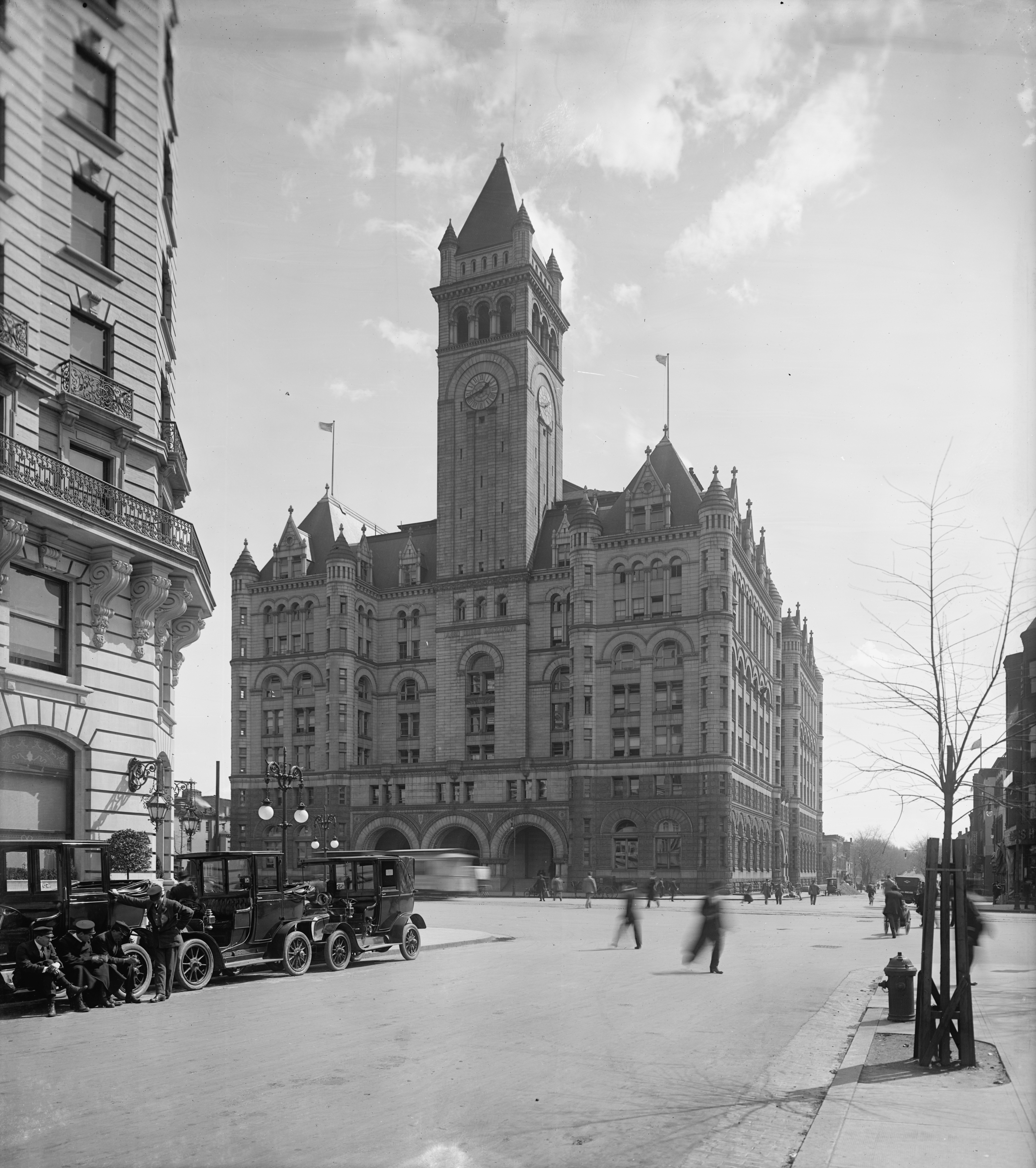
Looking south down 12th Street NW in 1911 at the Post Office Building, built to spur economic development in the area.

Limited attempts to transform the area by eliminating crime and encouraging upscale economic development occurred from 1890 to 1910. Congress approved the construction of a new, 12-story Romanesque Revival headquarters for the Post Office Department (to include a new central post office for the District of Columbia as well) in 1880. The building was designed to spur economic development in Murder Bay. Construction on the Post Office Building began in 1892 and was completed in 1899. At the time of its completion, the Post Office Building contained the largest uninterrupted enclosed space in the city. It was also the city's first building to have a steel frame structure, and the first to be built with electrical wiring incorporated into its design. Unfortunately, the anticipated economic development never occurred. In 1899, the Washington Board of Trade, a local organization of business leaders, proposed clearing Murder Bay of its existing structures and building government office buildings in the area. Spurred by the centennial of the transfer of the seat of government from Philadelphia to the District of Columbia, in 1900 the United States Congress formed the Senate Park Commission (also known as the McMillan Commission after its chair, Senator James McMillan) to reconcile competing visions for the development of Washington, D.C., and especially Pennsylvania Avenue, the National Mall, and nearby areas. The commission's plan for development, the McMillan Plan, proposed beautifying Pennsylvania Avenue and placing new government office buildings along a new Centennial Avenue to run the length of the National Mall.

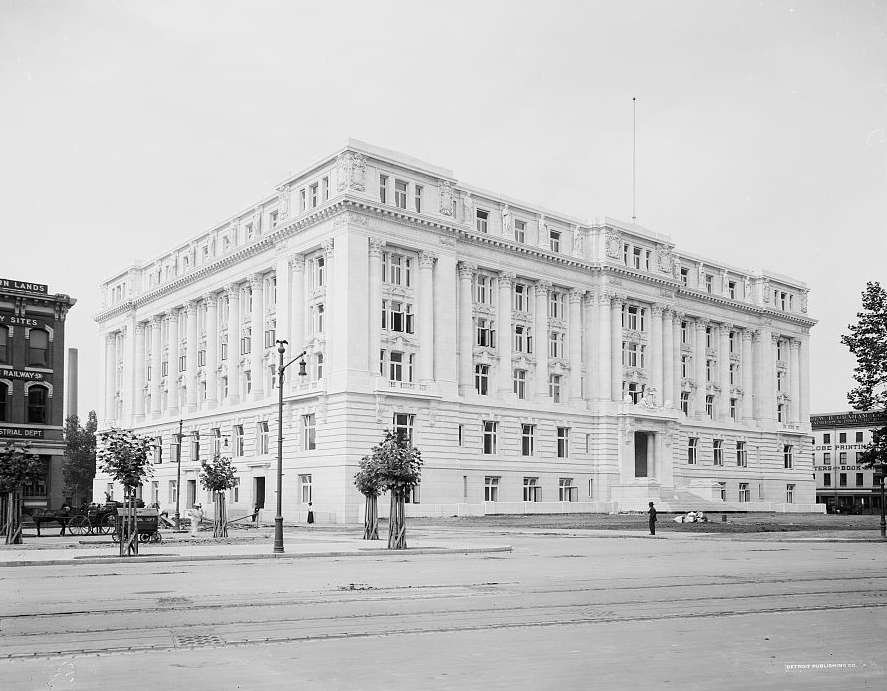
District Building (1908-1910)

The District Building was built in 1908 between 13 1/2 and 14th Streets NW on the south side of the avenue.

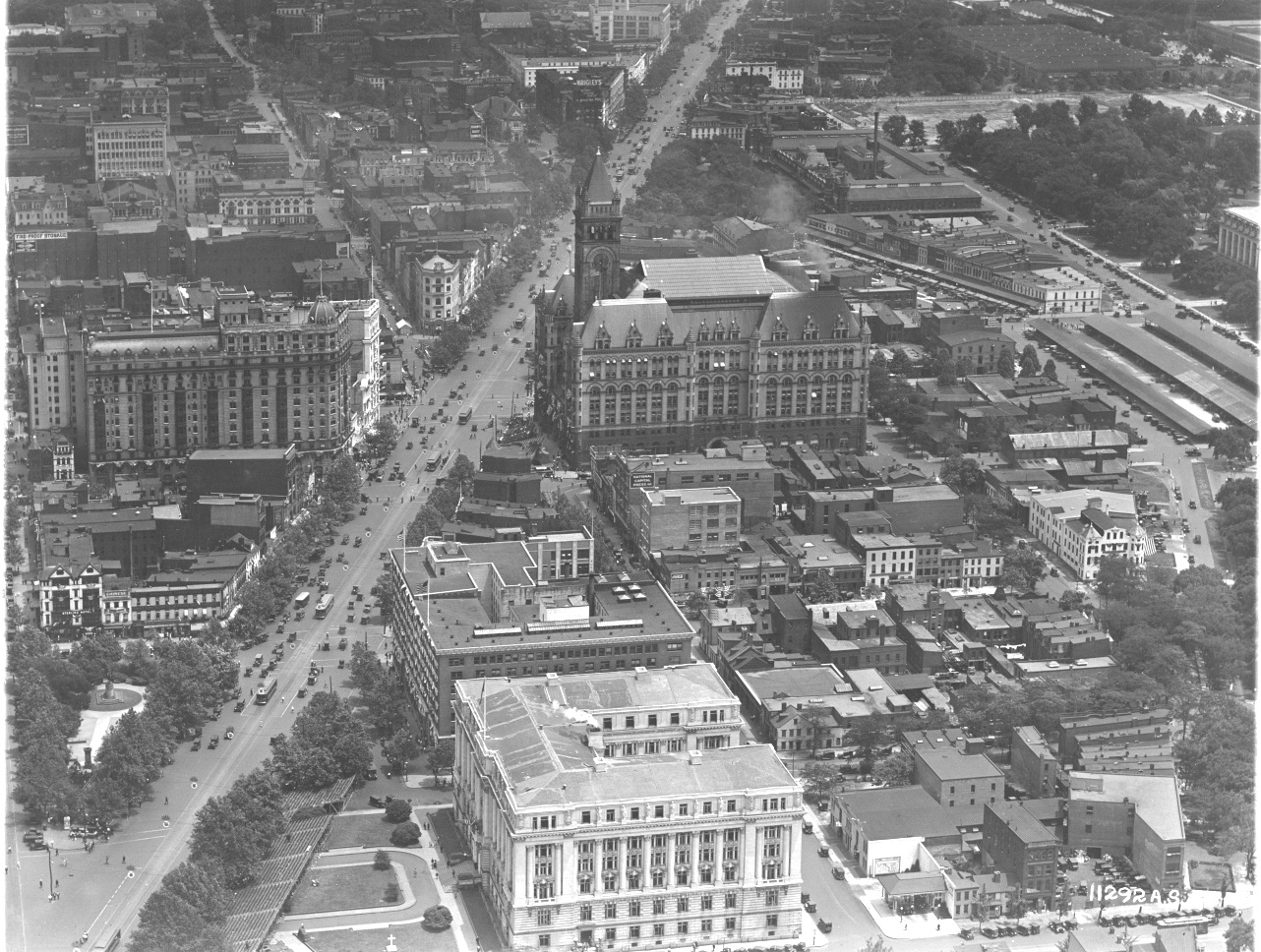
Federal Triangle area facing east in 1923. Pennsylvania Avenue is in the left, the District Building is in the foreground and the Post Office Building and Center Market are in the background.

Over the next few years, the President and Congress established several new agencies to supervise the approval, design, and construction of new buildings in the District of Columbia: The Commission of Fine Arts in 1910 (to approve the design of new structures), the Public Buildings Commission in 1916 (to make recommendations regarding the housing of federal agencies and offices), and the National Capital Parks and Planning Commission in 1924 (to oversee planning for the District). In the mid-1910s, Congress appropriated and the government spent $7 million to acquire land on Pennsylvania Avenue NW between 14th and 15th Streets NW and several blocks south. But no demolition or construction was conducted, and the government merely collected rent from tenants in the area. In 1924, the Public Buildings Commission recommended that a new series of federal office buildings be built near the White House. The effort saw success in 1926 with the passage by the United States Congress of the Public Buildings Act, which authorized the construction of the Federal Triangle complex of buildings as well as a new U.S. Supreme Court building opposite the United States Capitol, a major extension of the U.S. Government Printing Office building on North Capitol Street, and significant widening of B Street NW on the north side of the National Mall (eventually renamed Constitution Avenue). The construction of Federal Triangle enabled the Pennsylvania Avenue National Historic Site to become the "monumental core" of the city.

== Historic designation and rejuvenation ==
By the 1950s, Pennsylvania Avenue was marked by deteriorating homes, shops, and office buildings on the north side and monumental Neoclassical federal office buildings on the south side. President John F. Kennedy noticed the dilapidated condition of the street when his inaugural procession traversed Pennsylvania Avenue in 1961. Kennedy established the Ad Hoc Committee on Federal Office Space to recommend new structures to accommodate the growing federal government (which had constructed almost no new office buildings in the city since the Great Depression). Assistant Secretary of Labor Daniel Patrick Moynihan was assigned to help staff the committee. But in writing the Ad Hoc Committee's final report, Moynihan went beyond the committee's mandate and proposed (in part) that Pennsylvania Avenue be redeveloped using the powers of the federal government.

Kennedy approved of the idea, and established an informal "President's Council on Pennsylvania Avenue" to draw up a plan. The initial proposal, by architect Nathaniel A. Owings, envisioned a number of massive mixed-use buildings on the north side of Pennsylvania Avenue to complement Federal Triangle but which would also include theaters, restaurants, shops, condominiums, and apartments. The plan called for E Street NW to be buried and turned into a cross-town expressway, a major new plaza to anchor the avenue's west end, new plazas north and south of the National Archives, and a new reflecting pool for the base of Capitol Hill. The plan also envisioned that the proposed National Cultural Center (created by law in 1958) would be situated on the north side of the avenue (on the site of Chase's Theater and Riggs Building), but the location was later changed to the Foggy Bottom neighborhood and it was renamed the John F. Kennedy Center for the Performing Arts.

The plan was ready for review and presentation to Congressional leaders when Kennedy was assassinated in November 1963. A few days after President Kennedy's funeral, President Lyndon B. Johnson met with Jacqueline Kennedy in the Oval Office and asked what he could do for her. Mrs. Kennedy requested two things: That Cape Canaveral be renamed for her husband, and that the Pennsylvania Avenue redevelopment plan move forward. Word of the request leaked to the public, and Johnson publicly supported the area's redevelopment on October 24, 1964. Johnson subsequently approved the establishment of a Temporary President's Commission on Pennsylvania Avenue (composed of Cabinet members, federal planners, architects, and others) to move the plan forward, although it did not hold its first meeting until May 21, 1965. The Temporary Commission's goal was to push for a permanent body with the legal authority to engage in condemnation and force public and private bodies to conform to its plans. Before the Temporary Commission was named, District of Columbia officials agreed to abandon plans to build an office building west of the District Building, and the Federal Bureau of Investigation (FBI) agreed to reorient its planned headquarters more squarely with Pennsylvania Avenue.

Redevelopment of the area north of Pennsylvania Avenue became one of Secretary of the Interior Stewart Udall's highest priorities. The plan called for demolition of most of the existing structures north of Pennsylvania Avenue, but exercise of the government's powers of eminent domain would require (it was believed) creating a special designation for the area. In January 1965, the government proposed putting the entire area envisioned for redevelopment under the control of the National Park Service. According to historian Robert M. Utley, Secretary Udall and architect Nathaniel Owings drew the boundaries of the Pennsylvania Avenue National Historic Site according to the needs of Owing's plan. Further investigation, however, revealed that the Historic Sites Act of 1935 required a study of the area's national significance and a finding by the National Park System Advisory Board. Utley, then an Interior Department historian, was summoned to make these findings, but advised Udall that the Historic Sites Act was intended to preserve (not tear down) old buildings and that the drawings of the site's boundaries would have to follow the historical findings rather than define them. When Utley was advised that Udall was unhappy with his assessment, Utley quickly backtracked. Utley quickly assembled a panel of historians and produced as much research on the area within the Owings boundaries as he could. Although the Utley panel found that much of historical significance had occurred within the Owings boundaries and that a number of historic buildings still existed within the proposed site, there was little to support designation of the area as a historic district. Nonetheless, the advisory board ignored this weakness in the study, and approved the designation of the historic site.

The avenue and several surrounding blocks were designated a national historic site on September 30, 1965. The site was added to the National Register of Historic Places on October 15, 1966. Its boundaries are roughly Constitution Avenue, 15th Street NW, F Street NW, and 3rd Street NW.

Pennsylvania Avenue, the heart of the historic site, is recognized by many as "America's Main Street." The avenue plays a significant part in American political culture as well. "Since its creation in the head of L'Enfant, from the time Jefferson planted Lombardy poplars along its edge, this has been the most important avenue in Washington," noted author Jeffrey F. Meyer. "It is the corridor of power, linking the legislative, judicial, and executive branches." Professor of architecture Michael J. Bednar, commenting on the role the avenue plays in the nation's political life, has written, "A march down Pennsylvania Avenue...brings high visibility and prestige to a group and its cause." Historian Lucy G. Barber, who has studied the site's political meaning, has called it one of the "central and most potent national spaces of the nation." The American Planning Association said in 2014 that a "march down Pennsylvania Avenue holds great symbolic meaning and has played a role in the fight for workers' rights, women's suffrage, and civil rights."

=== Rejuvenation ===
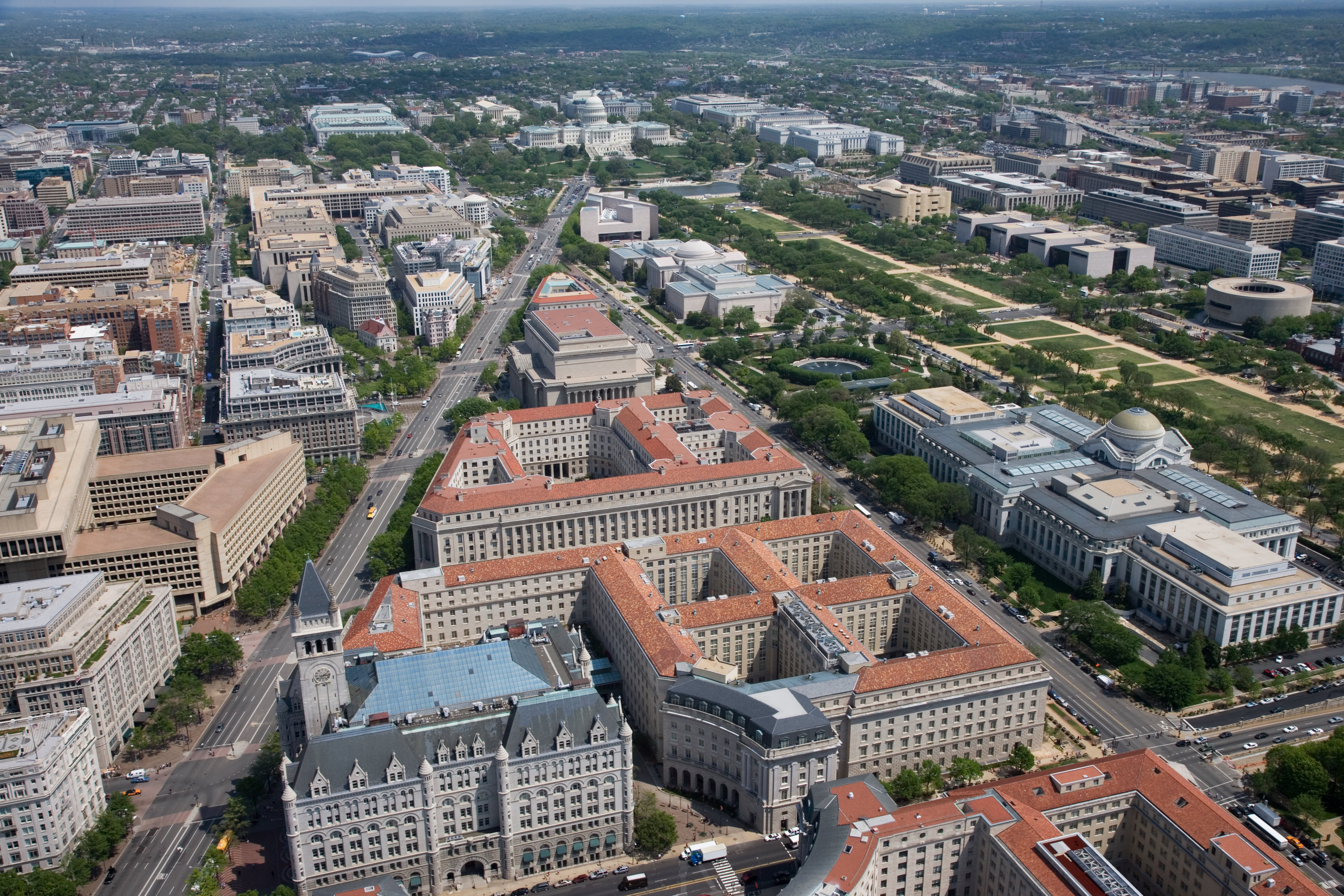
Aerial view of Pennsylvania Avenue NW facing east in 2007. Visible landmarks include the Old Post Office Pavilion (bottom center, with tower), the J. Edgar Hoover Building (center left, tan building), the National Gallery of Art (center rearground), and Market Square (middle left, with semicircular plaza).

Moynihan left public service (temporarily) in 1965, and Harry McPherson, counsel to President Johnson, kept the Pennsylvania Avenue redevelopment plan alive and shepherded it through additional revisions. Nonetheless, rejuvenation of Pennsylvania Avenue and the area north of the street began occurring as early as 1965, even though no permanent redevelopment authority had yet been established. The first building to be developed under the 1964 master plan was 451 12th Street NW (at the site of the old Raleigh Hotel). The Brutalist style structure was designed by Edmund W. Dreyfuss & Associates, which worked closely with John Woodbridge (a staff architect for the President's Council on Pennsylvania Avenue and a member of the firm Skidmore, Owings and Merrill).

On March 25, 1965, President Johnson issued Executive Order No. 11210, which established the Temporary Commission on Pennsylvania Avenue. The Temporary Commission was charged with analyzing the engineering, financial, planning, and other relevant considerations essential to ensuring the adoption and implementation of the 1964 master plan, as well as recommending appropriate legislation to the President and Congress. The Temporary Commission was also instructed to coordinate its efforts with the National Capital Planning Commission's master plan for the city. The Temporary Commission was an interim measure designed to ensure that no buildings incompatible with the plan were built until legislation regarding the master plan was passed. Although certain aspects of the master plan were controversial among some groups, the District of Columbia enacted zoning changes to permit mixed-used development and buildings which conformed to the Owings plan in April 1965. Construction of the first private building under the master plan, 451 12th Street NW, began in August 1965. Legislation to make the Temporary Commission permanent and give it extensive powers was introduced in October 1965, but strong opposition to the proposed National Plaza emerged and hindered passage of the bill. The size of the plaza remained intact into late 1967, and a large new arts and office building (to be built between 11th and 13th Streets NW on E Street NW) was proposed.

After two years, Congress had still not acted to establish a permanent Pennsylvania Avenue Commission, so President Johnson issued Executive Order 11347 to extend the life of the Temporary Commission on Pennsylvania Avenue by another two years. The lack of redevelopment began to have repercussions for existing businesses on the avenue. Faced with repeated threats to its existence and lower occupancy due to competition and anti-Vietnam War protests on Pennsylvania Avenue, the Willard Hotel closed suddenly on July 15, 1968. The Temporary Commission struggled to obtain any redevelopment along Pennsylvania Avenue. Local landowners refused to make investments so long as their property remained subject to condemnation. The Temporary Commission subsequently scaled the size of National Plaza down to half its original size, and began seeking private development dollars to build the square and associated buildings. In October 1969, still stymied by the lack of movement on any redevelopment, the Temporary Commission agreed (at the urging of member Elwood R. Quesada, the President and chief executive officer of the L'Enfant Plaza Corporation) to seek $200 million in private financing to build several luxury apartment buildings on the north side of Pennsylvania Avenue. The Temporary Commission ceased to function on November 15, 1969, due to lack of funds.

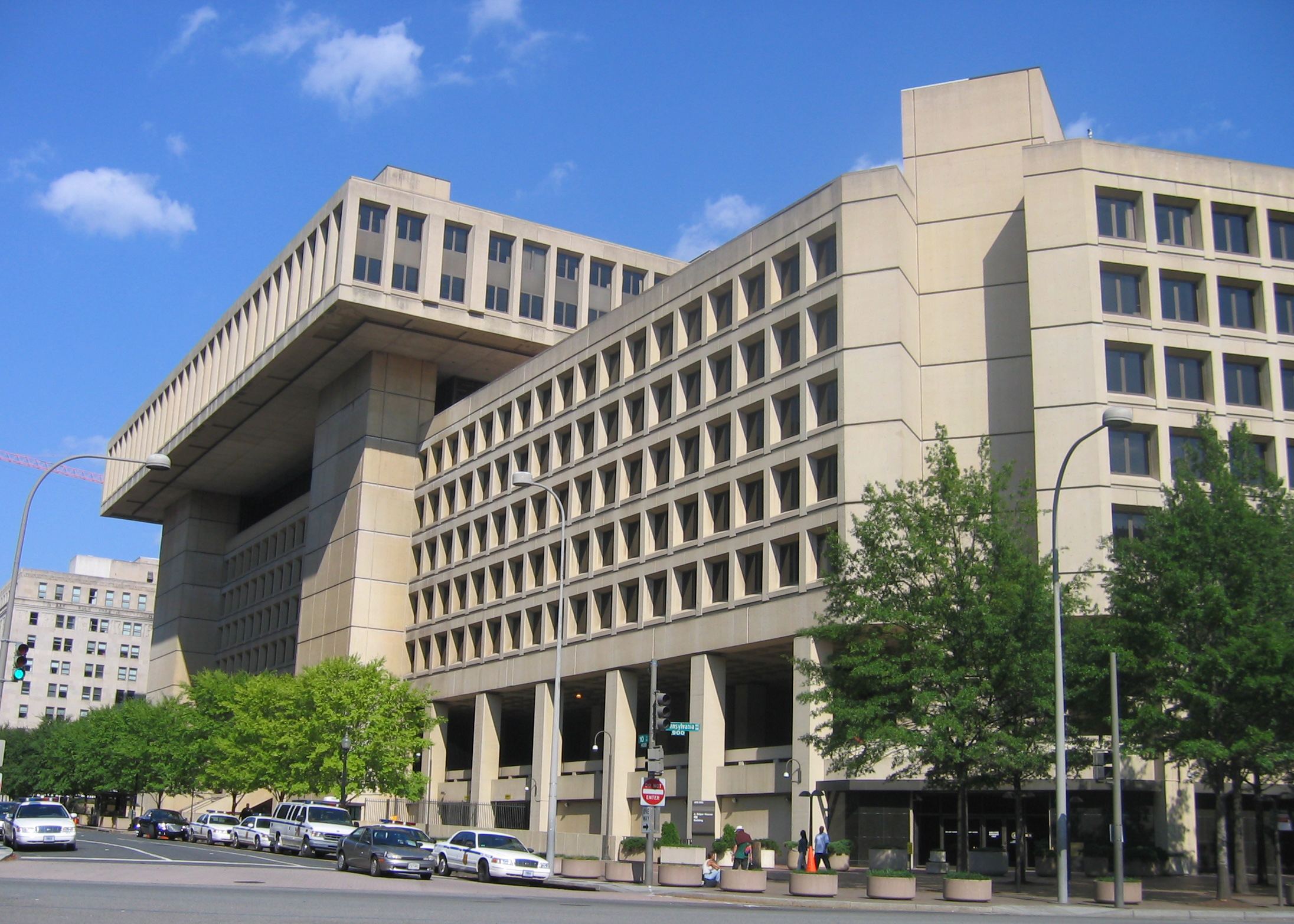
The J. Edgar Hoover Building, headquarters of the FBI.

Moynihan, however, was now Counselor to the President for Urban Affairs in the Nixon administration in 1969, where he continued to provide leadership on the rejuvenation of Pennsylvania Avenue. Moynihan now proposed a major shift in the redevelopment plan: Rather than funding redevelopment solely with federal funds, he suggested creating a government-owned corporation with a $200 million revolving fund to spur redevelopment along Pennsylvania Avenue. Interested in seeing some redevelopment occur before the Bicentennial celebrations in 1976, Congress took up Moynihan's plan in August 1970. But extensive controversy still raged over many aspects of the plan, as well as Nathaniel Owings' role in redevelopment plans. President Nixon made a daytime walking tour of Pennsylvania Avenue on September 8, 1970, and expressed his support for the Moynihan plan. But the bill, opposed by local housing advocates and businessmen as well as budget-conscious legislators, stalled in Congress for two years. In early 1972, Nixon once more signaled his strong support for the bill as a Bicentennial measure. In April, Democratic Representative Wayne N. Aspinall, chair of the House Committee on Natural Resources, and Republican Rep. John P. Saylor, the committee's ranking minority member, co-sponsored a bill which provided for a 15-member commission advised by a committee of landlords and tenants from the affected area. The master plan created by the new commission would have to be reviewed by Secretary of the Interior and relevant D.C. government agencies before being submitted to Congress, which would have 60 days to disapprove the plan by a majority vote of either house. The legislation authorized the new corporation to spend up to $1 million preparing a master plan, and authorized it to borrow up to $50 million from the Treasury or private sources to fund redevelopment. Congress approved the revised bill in October 1972, President Nixon signed the bill into law on October 30, 1972.

The Pennsylvania Avenue Development Corporation (PADC) was created on April 17, 1973. President Nixon named Elwood Quesada the PADC's first chairman, and the corporation's board of directors had its first meeting in June. The revised Owings plan for redevelopment was immediately called into question by John Woodbridge, the PADC's new staff director and an architect in Owings' firm. Upset with the way the massive, Brutalist-style J. Edgar Hoover Building disrupted foot traffic and retail trade along Pennsylvania Avenue, the PADC instead proposed a much stronger emphasis on retail and housing in the new master plan. Among the earliest projects it approved was Market Square, a mixed-use development on the north side of Pennsylvania Avenue NW between 7th and 9th Streets NW that contained housing as well as retail areas and included space for a new memorial. The PADC laid out its preliminary plan for redevelopment by March 1974, and approved its final plan in October 1974. The Willard Hotel, Old Post Office Pavilion, and other historic buildings on Pennsylvania Avenue were retained and the underground expressway removed from the plan.

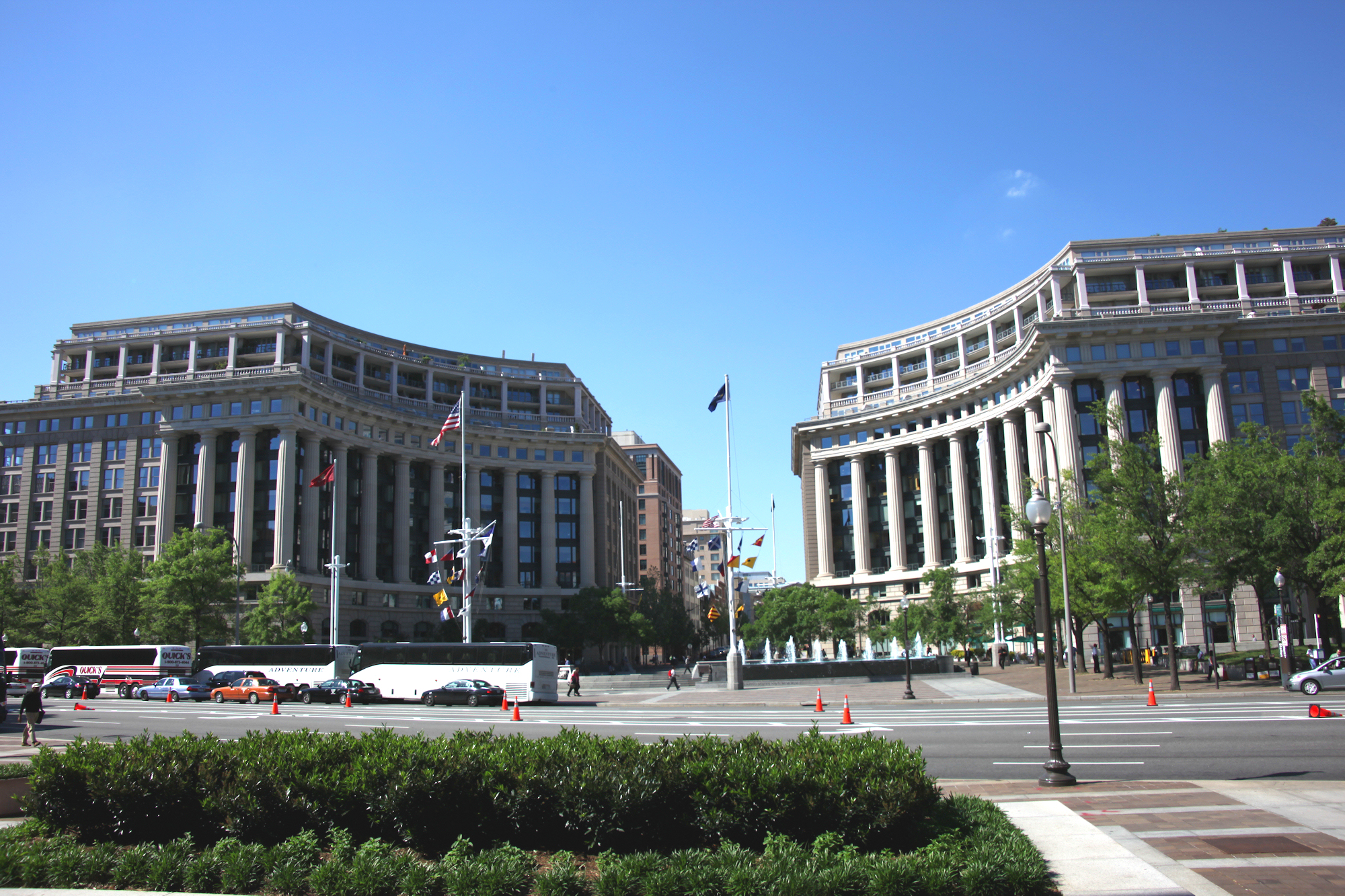
Market Square, one of the first developments approved in the redevelopment of Pennsylvania Avenue.

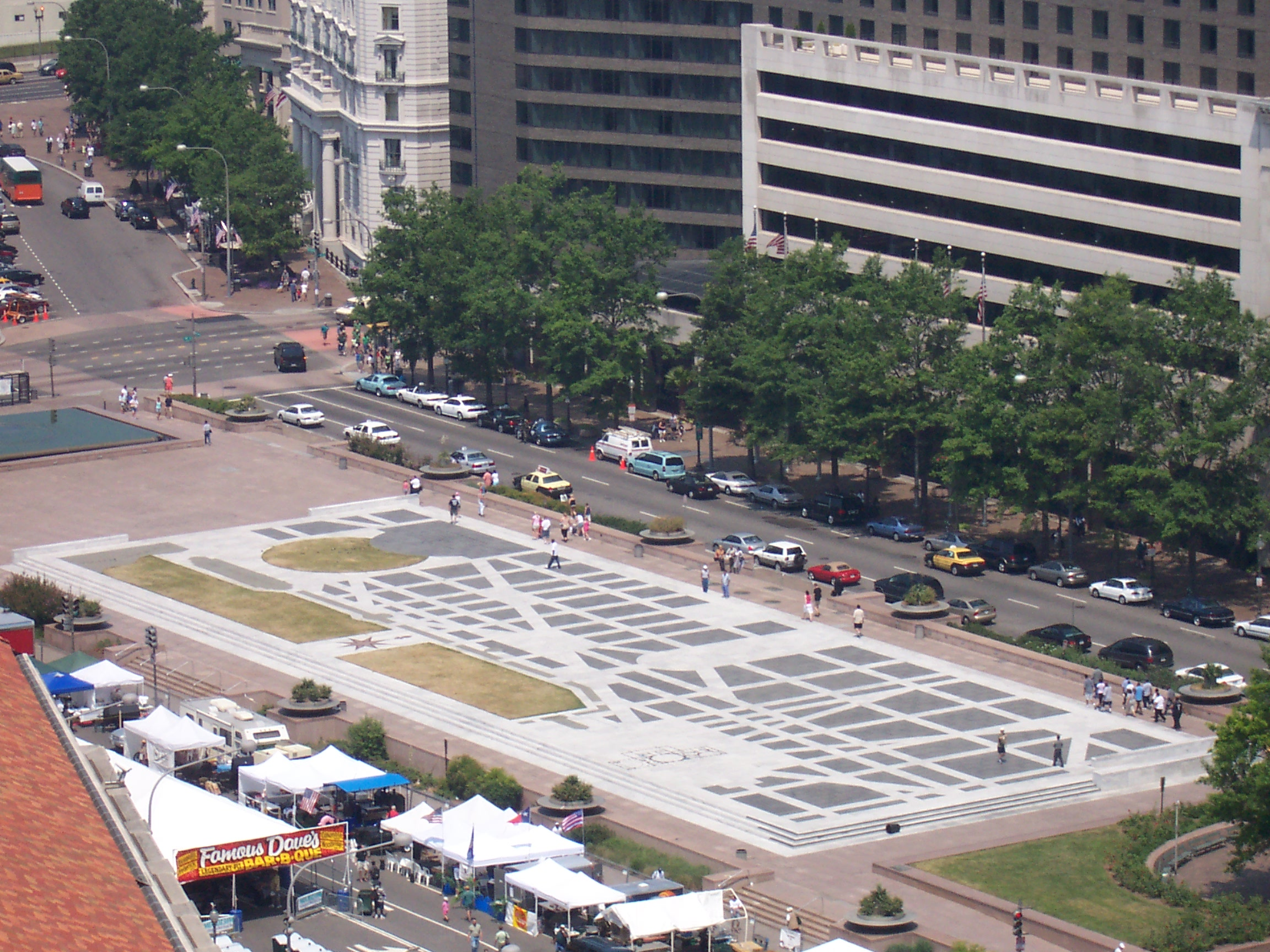
Freedom Plaza, looking northwest from the Old Post Office Pavilion in 2005. The plaza's inlaid stone depicts parts of Pierre (Peter) Charles L'Enfant's plan for the City of Washington, showing the present sites of the Federal Triangle, the United States Capitol, the White House and part of the National Mall, as well as the plan's legends.

The PADC asked Congress to appropriate $111 million for land acquisition, landscaping, and other needs. The plan saw yet further revisions during this period, reducing the size of the buildings along the north side of the avenue, reducing the size of the proposed Western Plaza, and allowing for greater variety of buildings and usage. In March 1977, Congress provided the first $29 million in funding and borrowing authority for the PADC to begin its work. Landscaping and widening of the sidewalks began in the fall of 1977, and rerouting of traffic began as construction on the new Western Plaza (renamed to Freedom Plaza in 1988) was undertaken. The following year, staff began working on two development prospectuses: one for the Willard and adjacent properties, and the other for the properties surrounding the National Press Building.

Over the next two decades, the PADC persuaded private corporations to invest more than $1.5 billion in executing the master plan. The PADC also funded the improvement of public spaces, redesigning the appearance of Pennsylvania Avenue and building seven new plazas. Among the changes made were alterations in lighting and benches, which may now be removed to accommodate inaugural parades and other large events and marches.

The Pennsylvania Avenue Development Corporation was dissolved in 1996.

=== 21st century rejuvenation drive ===
Deterioration of the Pennsylvania Avenue historic district was apparent by the second decade of the 21st century. The PADC's 1960s design (which emphasized low sidewalk lighting so as not to detract from nearby Federal Triangle or the United States Capitol) left the street inadequately lighted at night. The National Park Service, chronically underfunded for the previous four decades, allowed the sidewalks, landscape plantings, and seating to deteriorate. The refusal of the federal government to allow retail in the Federal Triangle and the J. Edgar Hoover Building (largely for security reasons) discouraged foot traffic at night. Combined with low lighting, pedestrians felt the street was unsafe after dark.

Property values in the historic district reflected the deteriorating physical and economic conditions: Class A office space in early 2014 leased for $80 per square foot less than the average for nearby city streets, and the vacancy rate for office space was anticipated to reach 21.8 percent by 2015. The Washington Business Journal editorialized on October 1, 2014, that, despite good planning, little of value had actually been implemented on Pennsylvania Avenue. The newspaper cited "the crumbling infrastructure, the weak public spaces, and the imposing, secure federal presence" which makes Pennsylvania Avenue "a dead zone outside of lunch rush and the occasional march." It described Freedom Plaza as ill-planned, the Hoover Building "a Brutalist landmark that sucks the life out of an entire block", the Reagan Building a structure that "never met expectations as a public gathering place", and Federal Triangle a monolithic barrier which severs the connection with the National Mall to the south.

In July 2014, the National Capital Planning Commission (NCPC) announced a new Pennsylvania Avenue Initiative. This planning project includes 10 government agencies—led by the government of the District of Columbia, the General Services Administration, and the National Park Service—and private landowners along Pennsylvania Avenue. The NCPC said the initiative will first develop a work-plan, and then begin identifying and proposing solutions for short-term needs. A long-term strategic vision and framework will be developed over time to address long-term issues.

In September 2014, a bill was introduced into the Council of the District of Columbia which would essentially resurrect the PADC, under the control of and financed by the District's government, rather than by the multiple parties that the NCPC's initiative anticipates. The legislation was introduced after concerns were raised that Pennsylvania Avenue needed "revitalization".

== Important events occurring at the site ==
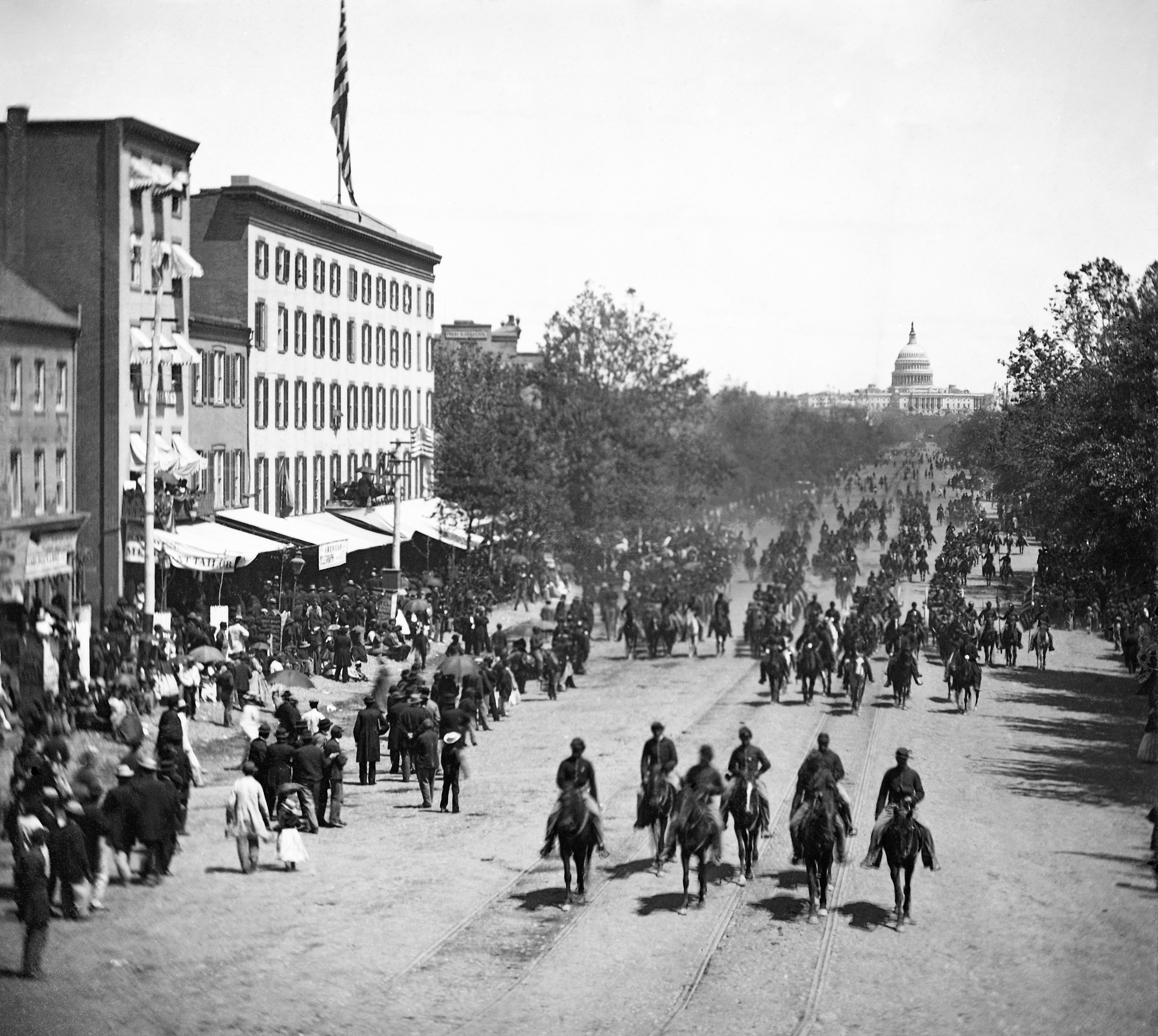
The Grand Review of the armies of the United States of America in May 1865.

Several events of national importance in American history have occurred within the boundaries of the Pennsylvania Avenue National Historic Site. Pennsylvania Avenue in particular is the focal point for a great many politically important parades and protests.

A number of these historic events have been assassinations or funerals. President Abraham Lincoln was assassinated at Ford's Theatre in 1865. President James A. Garfield was shot in the Baltimore & Potomac Railroad Passenger Terminal on July 2, 1881, by Charles J. Guiteau; he died 79 days later on September 19. Prior to its designation as a historic site, six presidential funeral processions had traversed Pennsylvania Avenue, the last being President John F. Kennedy's in 1963.

The site has also been the location of major military celebrations. In May 1865, the Army of the Potomac and the Army of the Tennessee marched along Pennsylvania Avenue in a "Grand Review" before newly-sworn President Andrew Johnson in celebration of the end of the American Civil War. More than 200,000 soldiers passed in review. The procession was so massive it took two full days for both armies to pass. Admiral George Dewey, hero of the Battle of Manila Bay during the Spanish–American War, also led a parade up the avenue in 1899 after the United States' victory in that conflict. General John J. Pershing led the American Expeditionary Force in review up Pennsylvania Avenue in 1919 after the conclusion of World War I.

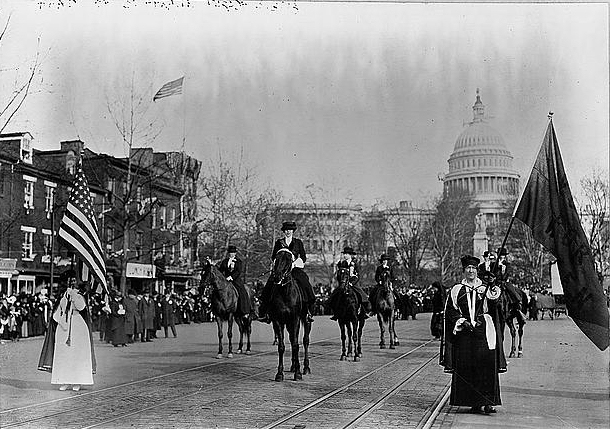
Members of the National American Woman Suffrage Association march down Pennsylvania Avenue on March 3, 1913.

The area has also been the site of several important political protests and parades. A protest march of 400 unemployed workers led by the populist Jacob Coxey occurred on Pennsylvania Avenue on April 30, 1894. The group became known as Coxey's Army, and this march was both the first significant popular protest march on Washington and also the first to receive national news coverage. On March 3, 1913, Alice Paul led the National American Woman Suffrage Association (a women's rights organization and precursor to the League of Women Voters) in a parade up Pennsylvania Avenue in which they demanded the right to vote. The association was the largest and most important organization in the fight for women's suffrage in the United States. The march was a critical event in the successful fight for the right to vote. The women's rights march was strongly opposed by government officials, so when the association won the right to march it set a precedent under which almost any group could march on Pennsylvania Avenue.

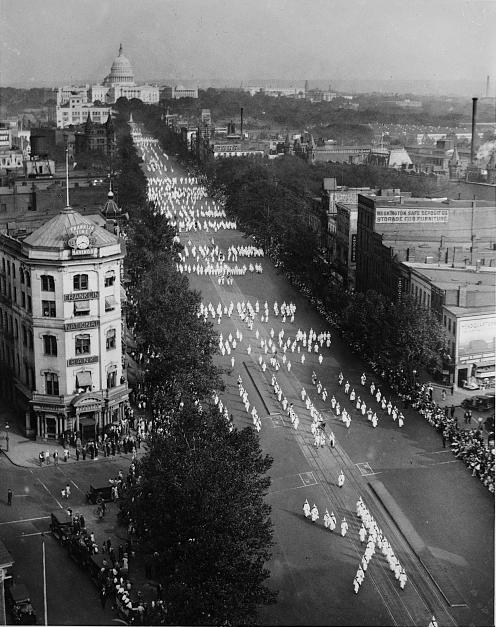
Ku Klux Klan parade on Pennsylvania Avenue on September 13, 1926

This precedent was exercised 12 years later. On August 8, 1925, at least 25,000 and perhaps as many as 75,000 members of the Ku Klux Klan marched on Pennsylvania Avenue. The Klan repeated its march with a similar number of participants in 1926. The marches signified the height of the Klan's power in the United States, even as it was about to lose much of its strength.

Another major demonstration on the avenue led to tragedy. In June 1932, thousands of homeless World War I veterans, their families, and their supporters occupied the recently condemned assemblage of buildings at the Federal Triangle construction site between 6th and 9th Streets NW as part of the Bonus March on the capital to win better veterans' benefits. When the "Bonus Army" was granted the right to march down Pennsylvania Avenue, it transformed the protestors in the eyes of most Americans from rabble-rousers to patriots seeking fairness. On July 28, 1932, President Herbert Hoover ordered General Douglas MacArthur to remove the Bonus Army from the site. At 4:45 p.m., MacArthur led a battalion of infantry, a squadron of cavalry, and six battle tanks (commanded by Major George S. Patton) down Pennsylvania Avenue to remove the Bonus Army. More than 20,000 civil service workers (leaving their offices for the day) watched as the U.S. Army attacked its own veterans. A Bonus marcher was killed on the site of the Apex Building, and the Federal Triangle site was cleared of the Bonus Army.

The site carries such importance that on occasion the mere threat of a march down Pennsylvania Avenue has been able to secure political change. For example, in 1941 the labor and civil rights leader A. Philip Randolph proposed a march on Washington, D.C., by 100,000 African American men to pressure the United States government into establishing protections against discrimination. President Franklin D. Roosevelt attempted to persuade Randolph to call off the march, worried it would harm defense mobilization, but Randolph refused. Roosevelt subsequently issued Executive Order 8802, which established the Fair Employment Practices Committee and banned discrimination in defense contracts. The march was called off. Historian Andrew E. Kersten has called Randolph's March on Washington "the most significant nonevent in American history."

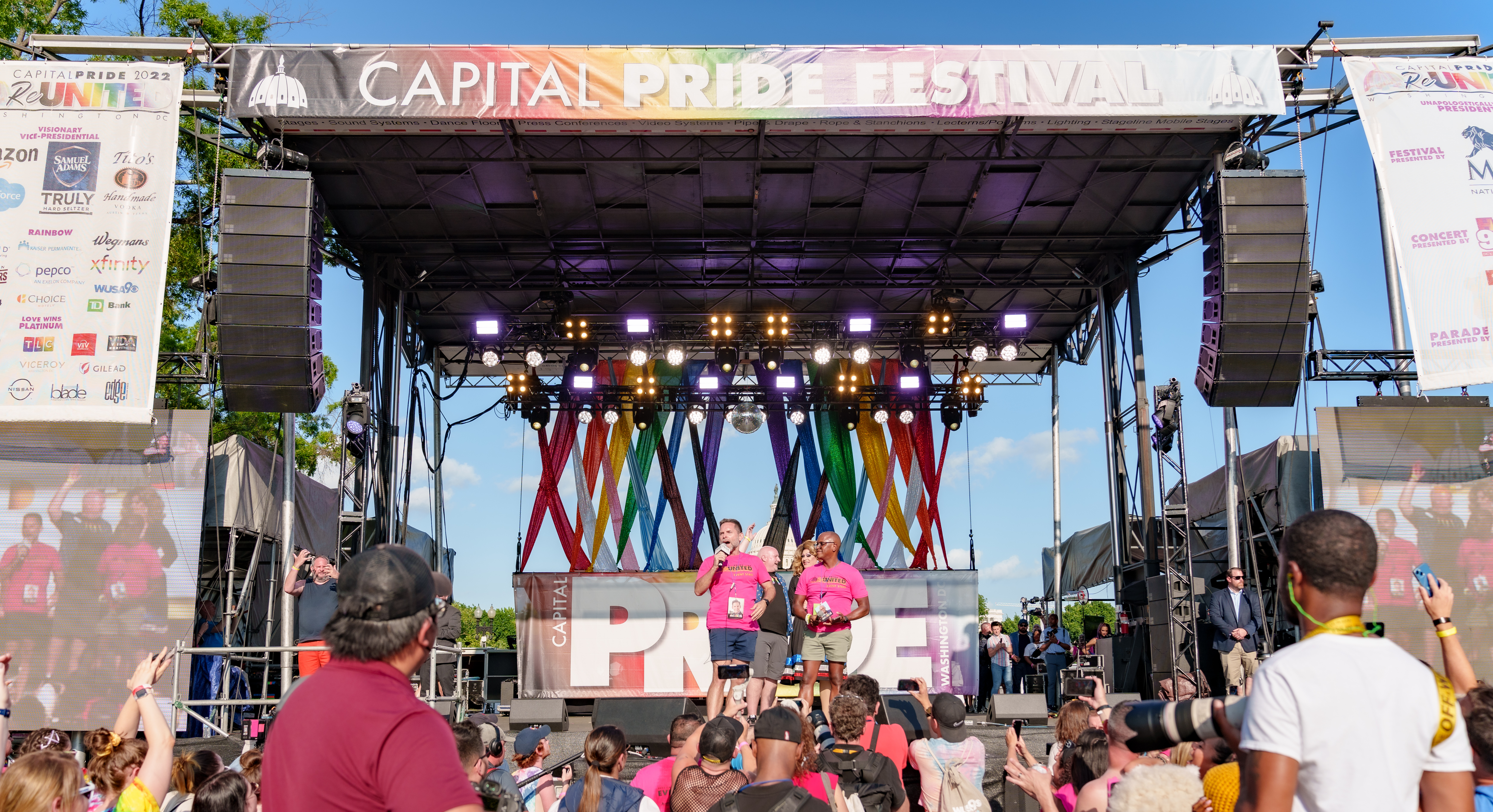
The main stage of the 2022 Capital Pride Festival on Pennsylvania Avenue set against the backdrop of the US Capitol

Capital Pride's festival occurs annually on Pennsylvania Avenue between 3rd Street and 7th Street. Major headliners perform on the main stage, near the intersection at 3rd Street.

== Area as metaphor ==
The historic site is often used as a political metaphor in the United States. Political scientists and political commentators often use the mile-and-a-half (2.4 kilometres) length of Pennsylvania Avenue as a metaphor for the political gulf which sometimes exist between the President's and Congress's policy priorities. It has also been used as a metaphor for the separation of powers under the United States Constitution. The area is also seen as a political synonym for the seat of government as well as the White House. President Franklin D. Roosevelt, for example, was often called "the sphinx of Pennsylvania Avenue."

== See also ==
- Architecture of Washington, D.C.

== Bibliography ==
- Boyer, M. Christine (1996). The City of Collective Memory: Its Historical Imagery and Architectural Entertainments. Boston: MIT Press. ISBN 978-0262522113.
- Bryan, Wilhelmus Bogart (1914). A History of the National Capital From Its Foundation Through the Period of the Adoption of the Organic Act. New York: The Macmillan Company.
- Dilts, James D. (October 1, 1996). The Great Road: The Building of the Baltimore and Ohio, the Nation's First Railroad, 1828–1853 (Reprint ed.). Palo Alto, Calif.: Stanford University Press. ISBN 978-0804726290.
- District of Columbia Office of Planning and the District of Columbia Mayor's Office on Asian and Pacific Islander Affairs. Chinatown Cultural Development Small Area Action Plan. Washington, D.C.: District of Columbia Office of Planning, October 19, 2009. Accessed 2010-03-24.
- Edsforth, Ronald; Bennett, Larry (1991). Popular Culture and Political Change in Modern America. Albany, N.Y.: SUNY Press. ISBN 978-0-7914-0765-3.
- Hazelton, George C. Jr. (1914). The National Capitol: Its Architecture, Art, and History. New York: J.F. Taylor & Company.
- Manchester, William. "Rock Bottom in America." New York. August 5, 1974.
- Meersman, Roger (1980). "The Kennedy Center: From Dream to Reality". Records of the Columbia Historical Society. 50: 525–588. JSTOR 40067836.
- "Pennsylvania Avenue National Historic Site, District of Columbia." National Parks Conservation Association. No date. Accessed 2010-03-19.
- Public Utilities Commission of the District of Columbia. Annual Report of the Public Utilities Commission of the District of Columbia. Washington, D.C.: Government Printing Office, 1915.
- Steward, John (1899). "Early Maps and Surveyors of the City of Washington, D.C." Records of the Columbia Historical Society.
- Streitmatter, Rodger (1998). Mightier Than the Sword: How the News Media Have Shaped American History. New York: Westview Press. ISBN 978-0813332116.
- Tindall, William (1914). Standard History of the City of Washington From a Study of the Original Sources. Knoxville, Tenn.: H.W. Crew & Co.
- Weaver, John D. "Bonus March." American Heritage. June 1963.
