= John A. Wilson Building =

- District Building
- U.S. National Register of Historic Places
- U.S. Historic district – Contributing property
- D.C. Inventory of Historic Sites
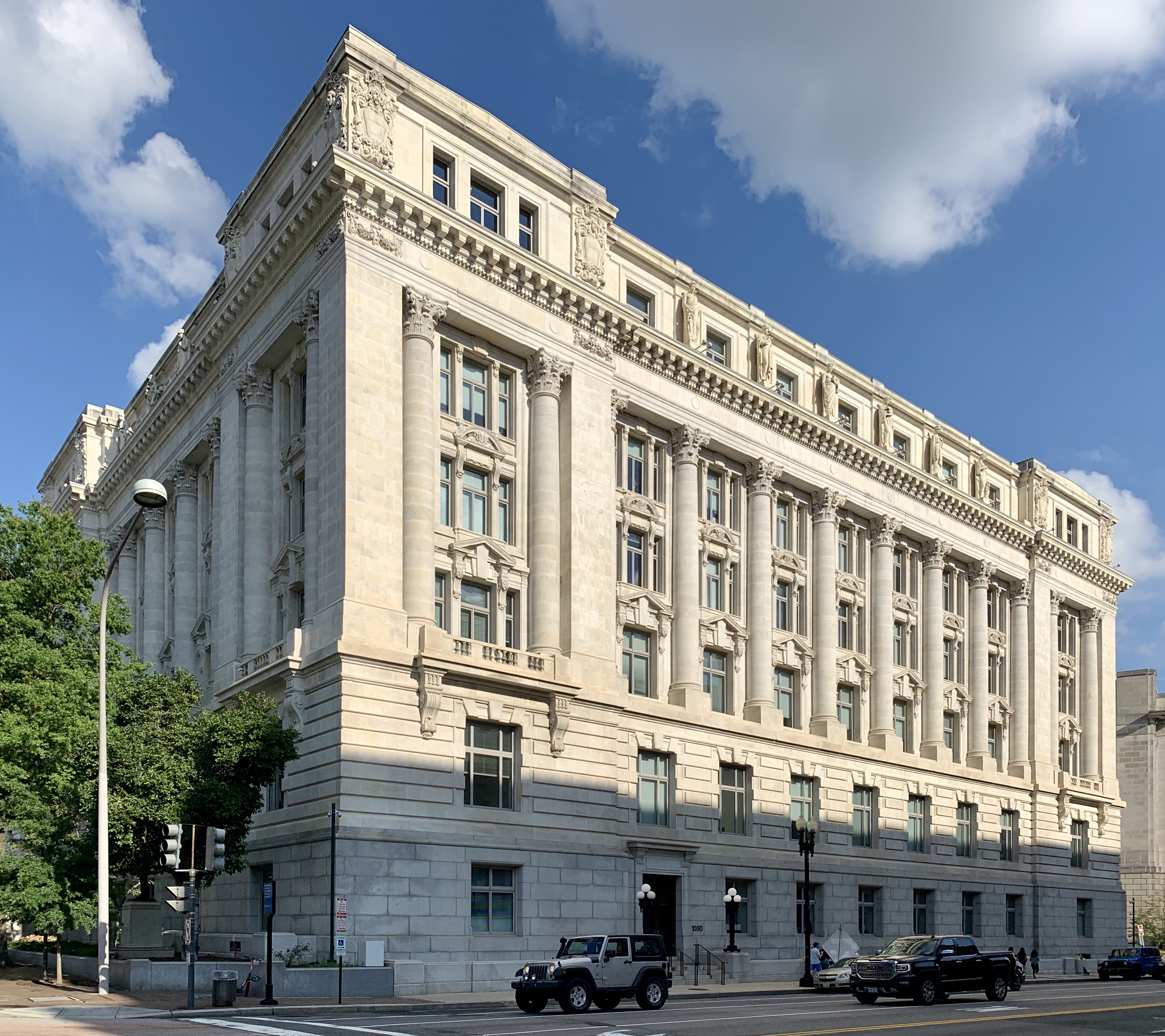
- The John A. Wilson Building in 2020

- Location within Washington, D.C.
- Location: 1350 Pennsylvania Avenue, NW, Washington, D.C., U.S.
- Coordinates: 38°53′42″N 77°1′53″W
- Area: 1.1 acres (0.45 ha)
- Built: 1908; 118 years ago
- Architect: Cope and Stewardson
- Architectural style: Beaux Arts
- Part of: Pennsylvania Avenue National Historic Site (ID66000865)
- NRHP reference No.: 72001422
- DCIHS No.: 149

Significant dates
- Added to NRHP: March 16, 1972
- Designated DCIHS: November 8, 1964

The John A. Wilson District Building, popularly known simply as the Wilson Building, houses the district offices and chambers of the Mayor and the Council of the District of Columbia. It was originally called the District Building. In 1994, it was renamed in recognition of former Council Chair John A. Wilson. Completed in 1908, during the administration of 26th President Theodore Roosevelt, the building is a contributing structure to the Pennsylvania Avenue National Historic Site.

== History ==
=== 19th century ===
The original site of the John A. Wilson Building was a streetcar power station that a fire had destroyed in 1897.

=== 20th century ===
With the "Public Building Act" of 1902, the United States Congress authorized $550,000 for the purchase of the property and an additional $1.5 million (later increased to $2 million) for the construction of a new District district building. Previously, the D.C. government had been housed in the old District of Columbia City Hall, a historic neoclassical styled structure on Indiana Avenue, constructed 1822–1849 by George Hadfield.

A competition for the design of the new District Building called for "classic design in the manner of the English Renaissance". The Philadelphia firm of Cope and Stewardson won the contract, and construction started in 1904. The building was dedicated on July 4, 1908, by Henry MacFarland, President of the Board of Commissioners. While the building has continuously served as the district offices of the District's local government, the United States Department of War housed 200 visiting servicemen there during World War II.

In 1977, twelve gunmen took about 150 people hostage at three sites around the District of Columbia. During the crisis, later known as the 1977 Hanafi Siege, two of those gunmen held about a dozen hostages inside the council chambers on the fifth floor of the District Building. Then-councilman Marion Barry was hit by a stray bullet during the commotion, which left two others dead, including DC Protective Services Police Officer Wesley Cantrell. The press room at the Wilson Building is named in memory of Maurice Williams, a 24-year-old reporter killed during the attack.

In 1995, two-thirds of the Wilson Building was leased to the federal government for a period of 20 years due to the district's inability to pay for needed repairs; during that time, the district paid approximately $8 million per year to the General Services Administration to lease back the space. The district government was able to regain use of the entire building after the United States Congress approved funds for major renovations. The offices of Mayor Anthony Williams and DC Council were temporarily relocated to One Judiciary Square.

== Exterior ==
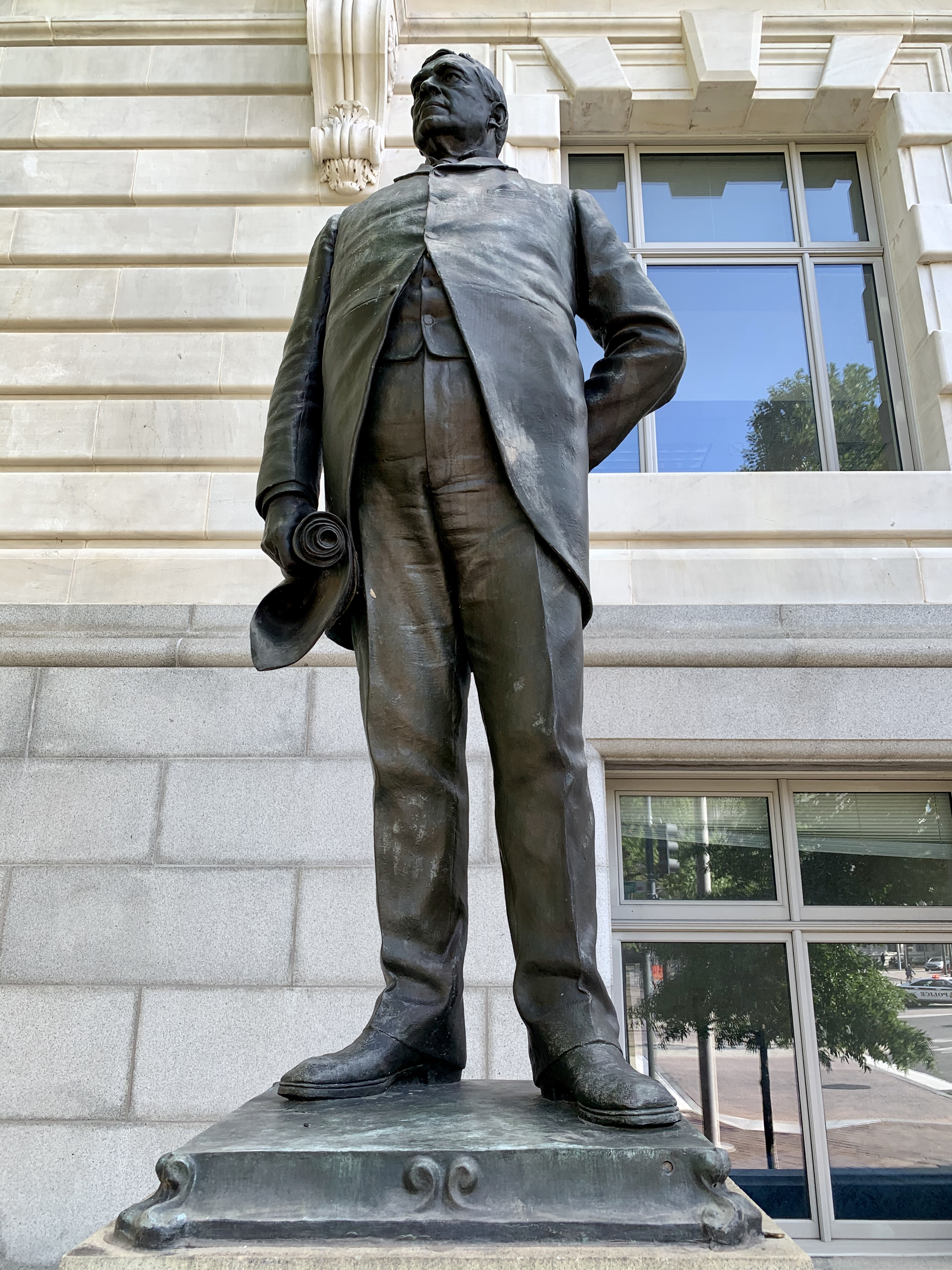
Statue of Alexander Robey Shepherd outside the Wilson Building

The District Building was designed in the American Beaux Arts classical revival style and takes up the entire block between 14th and 13 1/2th Streets NW, south of Pennsylvania Avenue across from Freedom Plaza. The base of the building is made of grey granite from Maine, while the upper four stories are constructed of white marble from New York. The main entrance to the building features an eagle with outstretched wings surrounded by two sculptures representing "Justice" and "Law." The fifth (attic) story features alternating male and female sculptures of heroic figures that represent: sculpture, painting, architecture, music, commerce, engineering, agriculture, and statesmanship.

In January 2005, the statue of Alexander Robey Shepherd, Governor of the District of Columbia from 1873 to 1874, was restored to its original location in front of the Wilson Building at the northwest corner. It had been removed in 1979 during the first year of Mayor Marion Barry's administration.

== Current use ==
Following the District of Columbia Home Rule Act, the appointed Mayor-Commissioner form of government was replaced by a locally elected Mayor of the District of Columbia and Council of the District of Columbia who maintain their offices within the Wilson Building. The D.C. Council chamber, committee rooms, and legislative staff offices are also in the building.

In October 2006, the DC Commission on the Arts and Humanities opened the City Hall Arts Collection. Art pieces from a diverse group of D.C.-area artists are on public display throughout the building. Works include a glass casting by Michael Janis of the Washington Glass School; paintings by Felrath Hines (former chief conservator of the Hirshhorn Museum), Sylvia Snowden, and Mark Cameron Boyd; photographs by Alexandra Silverthorne, Harlee Little, and Max Hirshfeld; and sculpture by Jae Ko. The portrait of John A. Wilson on display at the main entrance is by renowned portrait painter Simmie Knox.

== See also ==
- List of state and territorial capitols in the United States
