= Alexandra Silverthorne =

American photographer (born 1980)

- Born: 1980

Alexandra Silverthorne (born 1980) is a Washington, D.C.–based artist and photographer. Her work focuses on spatial theory and exploration. She has been an adjunct professor at American University for Film and Media Arts as well as the University of the District of Columbia since 2010 where she works with undergraduates in darkroom photography.

== Education ==
A native of D.C., Silverthorne attended St. Mark's School in Southborough, Massachusetts, and Connecticut College in New London, Connecticut, where she majored in Government and minored in Art and Philosophy. She received her Master of Fine Arts in Studio Arts from the Maine College of Art in Portland, ME.

== Work ==
Silverthorne says she "uses the camera as a means to understand and explore spatial environments and encounters. As projects evolve, her photographs often move beyond the mat and the frame to become sculptural objects, projections, and installations."

Her "current projects include the effect of disorientation in experiencing and moving through space, instinctual explorations of architectural structures, and nocturnal documentation of unfamiliar landscapes."

== Career ==
"In 2003, Silverthorne co-founded Panorama Community Arts with the goal of providing art experiences to all residents of DC."

Silverthorne's first main works were from demonstrations in Washington and New York against the war in Iraq. In 2004, she was selected to be one of six American representatives at the 2004 World Conference Against A & H Bombs, a trip which resulted in a solo exhibit at the Dr. Martin Luther King Jr. Library in Washington. She continued to show around the DC area in a variety of art spaces and galleries.

Silverthorne had a solo exhibition at the BlackRock Center for the Arts in 2016 titled All the Ways In which featured different black and white images showing different ways to enter the Dublin Lake in rural New Hampshire. To create this body of work, "Silverthorne spent several weeks kayaking around the lake capturing images with a film camera in order examining ingresses to the lake from both public town beaches and private boathouses." Her 2019 participation in NARRATIVE, a group show featuring the work of fourteen photographers at Studio Gallery in DC. was noted by photography art critic Louis Jacobson as one of the Best Photography Exhibits of 2018 in The Washington City Paper. In December 2018, Silverthorne joined a group of local Washington, DC area artists and became a member of DCAC's 2019–2020 Sparkplug Collective.

Silverthorne is the recipient of grants from the D.C. Commission on the Arts and Humanities and the Puffin Foundation. She was awarded Artist Fellowship Awards in 2010, 2011, 2013, 2016, 2017, 2018, and 2019 from the DCCAH (2010 award was for the Young Artist category). Her photography can be found in the public collections of the City of Washington, DC at the John A. Wilson Building in Washington, DC.

Silverthorne is the author of two photography books: Midnight, published in 2011 and yes is the only living thing, published in 2019.
