= Henry D. Cooke =

American politician

Henry David Cooke
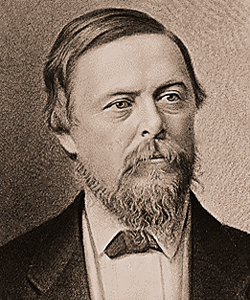
- Henry D. Cooke

1st Governor of the District of Columbia
- In office February 28, 1871 – September 13, 1873
- Preceded by: None (office created)
- Succeeded by: Alexander Robey Shepherd

Personal details
- Born: November 23, 1825 Sandusky, Ohio, U.S.
- Died: February 24, 1881 (aged 55) Washington, D.C., U.S.
- Resting place: Oak Hill Cemetery; Washington, D.C., U.S.
- Party: Republican
- Profession: financier

Henry David Cooke (November 23, 1825 – February 24, 1881) was an American financier, journalist, railroad executive, and politician. He was the younger brother of Philadelphia financier Jay Cooke. A member of the Republican political machine in post-Civil War Washington, D.C., Cooke was appointed first territorial governor of the District of Columbia by Ulysses S. Grant.

== Biography ==
Born in Sandusky, Ohio, in 1825, a son of Congressman Eleutheros Cooke, Henry D. Cooke studied at Allegheny College in Meadville, Pennsylvania, and Transylvania University in Lexington, Kentucky, where he graduated in 1844. He began to study law but soon turned his attention to journalism. In 1847, he sailed for Valparaíso, Chile, as an attaché to the United States consul there, but was shipwrecked. He was detained after the wreck at St. Thomas, where he conceived the idea of a steamship line from New York to San Francisco via the isthmus of Panama and wrote about his idea to the Philadelphia United States Gazette and the New York Courier and Enquirer. Consul W. G. Moorhead told other State Department officials about the idea, and in about two years the Pacific Mail Steamship Company was organized. Cooke afterward lived in San Francisco, where he was connected with shipping interests. He was the first to announce to the authorities at Washington, through a despatch from the military governor of California, the discovery of gold in the Sacramento valley. Becoming involved by suretyship for a reckless speculator, he lost his fortune. (Another source says a fire in San Francisco left him burdened with debts.)

He returned to Ohio, joined the Sandusky Register as a journalist, and by 1856 had become the newspaper's sole editor and proprietor. That same year he became a presidential elector for John C. Fremont, the first Republican candidate for President of the United States.

By 1860, Cooke was the proprietor of the Ohio State Journal, a Republican newspaper. Although it was unprofitable, it made him a favorite of various Washington officials, including Treasury Secretary Salmon P. Chase, Senator John J. Sherman, and General Ulysses S. Grant. These alliances made Cooke a particular asset to his brother Jay; Chase's friendship allowed the Cookes to become war profiteers during the Civil War, selling bonds and establishing the sale of government loans. In 1862, Jay Cooke opened a Washington branch of his Jay Cooke & Co. financing firm, making Henry the partner in charge of that office.

Sherman's position on the Commission of Ways and Means allowed Henry Cooke to gain a profitable contract for government binding, and in 1862 helped to make him president of the Washington and Georgetown Street Railroad Company. He also became president of the First Washington National Bank. In addition, Cooke became the Congressional Radical Republicans' factotum in maintaining power over the District of Columbia, financing (along with fellow Republican Alexander Robey Shepherd) the election of Sayles J. Bowen as Mayor of Washington, D.C.

In 1870, the national capital was in dire financial straits, with both Congress and local government more involved with racial integration and civil rights policies for former slaves than with fiscal solvency or basic city services. With popular sentiment behind him, Republican political boss Alexander Shepherd convinced the Congress to unite the governments of Washington, Georgetown, and Washington County under a single territorial government for the District of Columbia, with the governor of the District to be appointed. Congress passed the bill in January 1871, and in the following month, President Ulysses S. Grant made Cooke, his friend (and an ally of Shepherd), governor of the District.

As governor, Cooke was uninterested in the day-to-day running of the city, preferring his business interests and lobbying for his brother. Although he was chief executive officer of the city's Board of Public Works, he did not bother to attend the meetings, allowing the board's vice president—Shepherd—to take over. In truth, even in his other duties, Cooke was largely an agent for Shepherd's agenda.

Cooke was widely predicted to stay in power only until the formerly independent District sections of Washington, Georgetown, and Washington County had eased their factional tensions and accepted unified rule over the District, upon which the universally beloved Shepherd would become governor. Cooke suffered a serious setback when Jay Cooke & Co. failed on September 18, 1873, in the Panic of 1873. The impending failure of the bank had already forced his resignation on September 10 as territorial governor.

Cooke was also involved in one of the scandals that plagued the Grant administration known as the Seneca Stone Ring Scandal. The owners of the Seneca Quarry, the Seneca Sandstone Company, had sold shares to senior Republican leaders in 1867 at half price, including Ulysses Grant a year before his election to the presidency, in the hopes of buying influence in the post-war building boom in Washington, D.C. This move undercapitalized the company, such that it took out several unsecured loans to fund its operations, notably from the Freedman's Savings Bank, which served freed African-American slaves and their descendants. Henry Cooke sat on the boards of both the Seneca Sandstone Company and the Freedman's Bank and facilitated the loans, though this was a clear conflict of interest. With the Panic of 1873, the indebted Seneca quarry could not pay its debts back, which in turn helped undermine the Freedman's Bank. Both institutions went bankrupt in 1876. Congress investigated and recommended that Henry Cooke and others be indicted, but no one ever was.

The failure of Jay Cooke & Co. forced Henry Cooke, his wife, and their three young children to move in with Cooke's eldest daughter and her husband. In 1875, Cooke earned a substantial sum as the executor of the estate of Salmon P. Chase, the former Chief Justice of the United States. The Cookes journeyed to Europe in the summer and fall of 1875.

Cooke had long suffered from Bright's disease. In early 1881, he fell seriously ill. He died of kidney failure on February 24, 1881, and was buried at Oak Hill Cemetery in Washington, D.C.

Political offices
Preceded by none	Governor of the District of Columbia; 1871–1873	Succeeded by Alexander Shepherd
