= Sam Smith (journalist) =

American journalist (born 1937)

- Born: 1937 (age 88–89); Washington, D.C., U.S.
- Education: Harvard University
- Occupations: Journalist, political activist

Sam Smith (born 1937) is an American journalist and political activist who was an early pioneer in alternative media. He was also involved in the establishment of the Green Party of the United States. Several times a week, Smith publishes an email news digest, Undernews.

== Early life and education ==
Smith was born in Washington D.C. in 1937, into an Episcopalian and Quaker family. He grew up in Philadelphia, where he was educated in a Quaker high school. Smith attended Harvard University, where he became news director of the college radio station, a drummer on the college dance circuit. He graduated in 1959.

== Career ==
Following his graduation from Harvard University, Smith went to work in radio news in Washington, D.C. In 1961, Smith joined the United States Coast Guard, where he served three years as an officer.

In 1964, Smith returned to Washington, D.C., where he started an alternative monthly, The Idler. At the time, there were only a handful of such journals being published.

In 1965, Smith, then working in radio, was offered a job as assistant to James Reston, the Washington correspondent of The New York Times, and later was offered a position at The Washington Post, which he turned down because he preferred to pursue alternative journalism. The following year, he took part in a day-long SNCC boycott of Washington D.C.'s transit buses, giving rides to boycotters with his car. After his article on the action appeared, Smith was visited by the local chair of SNCC who was seeking help with public relations. Thus began a long relationship with Marion Barry, who later became mayor of the city.

That same year, in 1966, Smith launched a community newspaper called the Capitol East Gazette to serve a largely poor, black neighborhood of Washington DC. Aided by a $2,000 grant from a local Lutheran church, the Gazette went on to cover such issues as plans to build a huge network of freeways in the city, the war on poverty, public education, neighborhood battles, and urban planning. Smith also became a vociferous advocate of statehood for the District of Columbia. In 1969, the paper was renamed the DC Gazette and became a citywide alternative newspaper. In subsequent years, contributors would include James Ridgeway, Jim Hightower, Eugene McCarthy, and Paul Krassner, and the publication became an articulate voice opposing the Vietnam War.

In 1974, Indiana University Press published Smith's first book, Captive Capital: Colonial Life in Modern Washington. In 1980, he became a guest commentator on the local NPR radio station and Washington correspondent for the Illustrated London News.

In 1984, the Gazette was renamed Progressive Review and evolved into a bimonthly format. Smith's articles on the savings and loan scandal, the problems of urban America, the first Gulf War, the Bush family, and scandals surrounding the Clintons were widely cited.

== National Green Party ==
In 1993, Indiana University Press published Smith's book on Bill Clinton's first year. Because of his opposition to Clinton and his work at reforming the liberal mainstay, Americans for Democratic Action, he was purged as a vice president of the organization. He then turned his energies to helping create a national Green Party and his home was an occasional gathering spot for Green organizers up until the founding of the party on November 17, 1996. In subsequent years, Smith found he was banned from the local NPR station as well as listed on de facto blacklists at C-SPAN and the Washington Post for what he believes was too aggressively pursuing the Clinton scandals.

In 1994, Smith started sending out email updates. The following year, he launched a website, prorev.com, which subsequently grew to be one of the most popular websites for progressive politics on the Net. In 1994 there were only 3,000 websites in America.

In 1997, Sam Smith's Great American Political Repair Manual was published. His fourth book, Why Bother? Getting a Life in Locked Down Land appeared in 2001. In 2003, Smith wrote a 2000-word history of the Iraq War for Harper's Magazine lifted entirely from verbatim statements by Bush administration officials.

In 2004, Smith stopped publishing the Progressive Review in hard copy edition, continuing Undernews in email format with regular updates to his website. In its current form, Undernews consists of an entertaining and idiosyncratic selection of news excerpts from a wide variety of sources together with pithy commentaries by Smith himself.

Smith and his wife, Kathryn Smith, were named Citizens of the Year for 2024 by the Town of Freeport, Maine.
