= Statue of Alexander Robey Shepherd =

Statue by Ulric Stonewall Jackson Dunbar in Washington, D.C., U.S.

Alexander Robey Shepherd
- "Boss" Shepherd
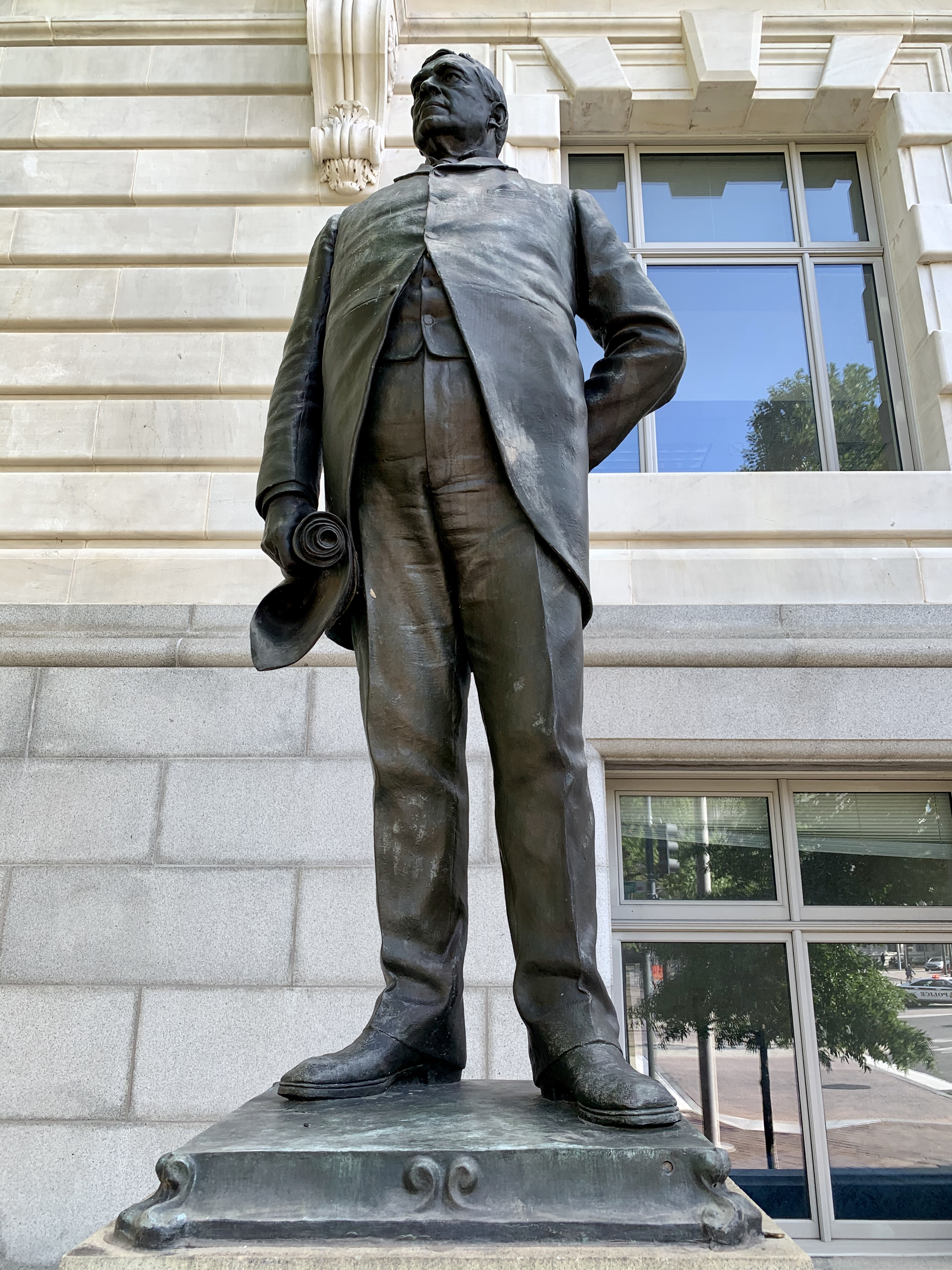
- Statue in 2020
- Artist: Ulric Stonewall Jackson Dunbar
- Year: 1905
- Type: Bronze
- Dimensions: 240 cm × 210 cm × 270 cm (8 ft × 7 ft × 9 ft)
- Location: Washington, D.C.; 38.895378°N 77.031594°W
- Owner: District of Columbia

Alexander Robey Shepherd is a bronze statue, by Ulric Stonewall Jackson Dunbar. It is located at the John A. Wilson Building, Northwest, Washington, D.C., on the north front.

== History ==
It was dedicated on May 3, 1909, in front of the District of Columbia Municipal Building at 1350 Pennsylvania Avenue, N. W., where it stood from 1909 to 1931. Due to construction of the Federal Triangle, it was moved in 1931 to what is today Freedom Plaza. In 1979 construction began on Freedom Plaza and the statue was placed in storage, most likely at the Blue Plains Advanced Wastewater Treatment Plant, 5000 Overlook Avenue, S.W. It was installed at 4701 Shepherd Parkway, S.W. for a brief period in the 1980s before being returned to its original location in 2005.

== See also ==
- List of public art in Washington, D.C., Ward 6
