= Center Market, Washington, D.C. =

Former building in Washington, D.C.

Center Market
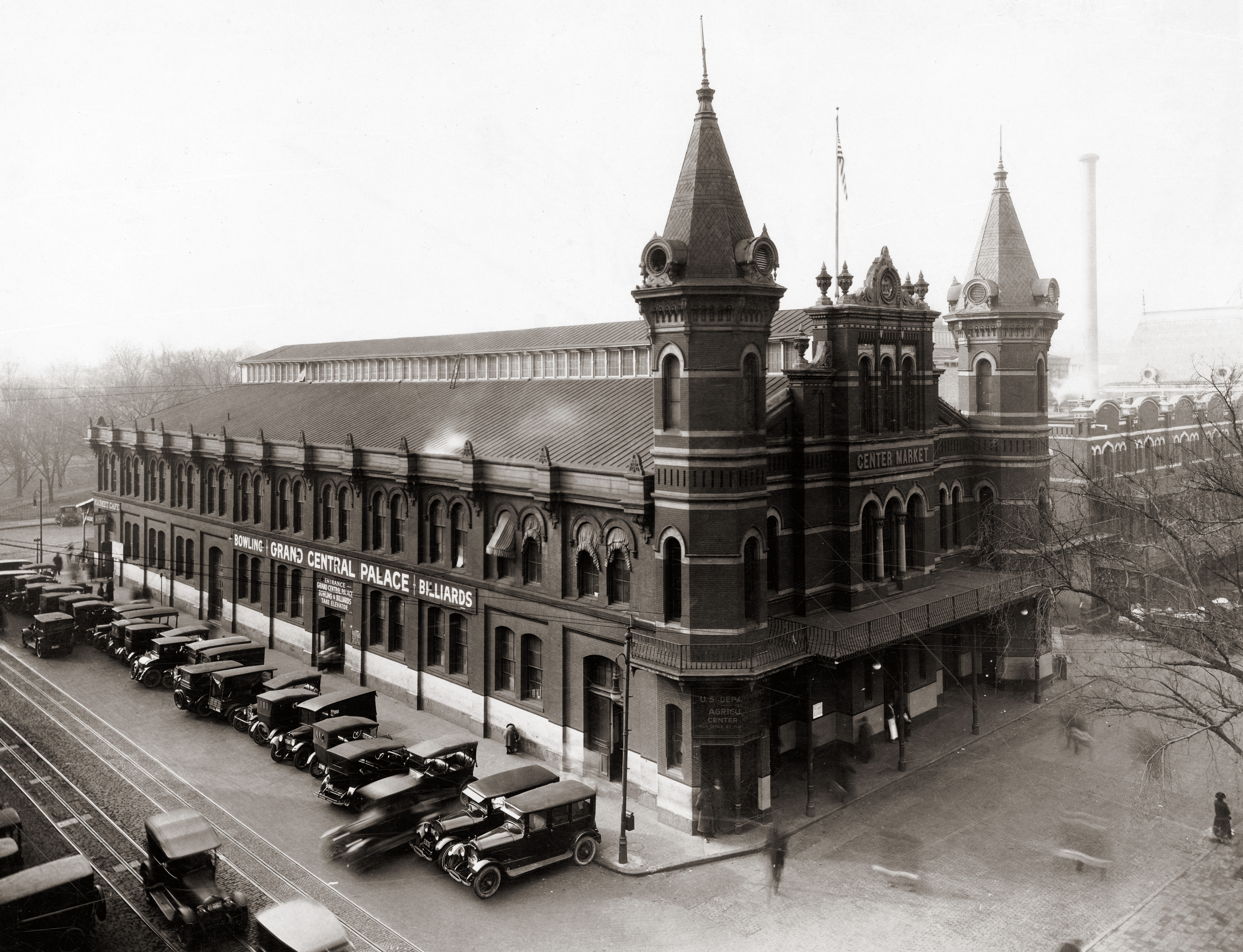
- Center Market in the 1920s
- Location: Constitution Avenue between 7th Street and 9th Street, NW; Washington, D.C.; 38°53′34″N 77°01′23″W
- Opening date: 1872
- Closing date: 1931
- Management: Washington Market Company
- Architect: Adolph Cluss
- Interactive map of Center Market

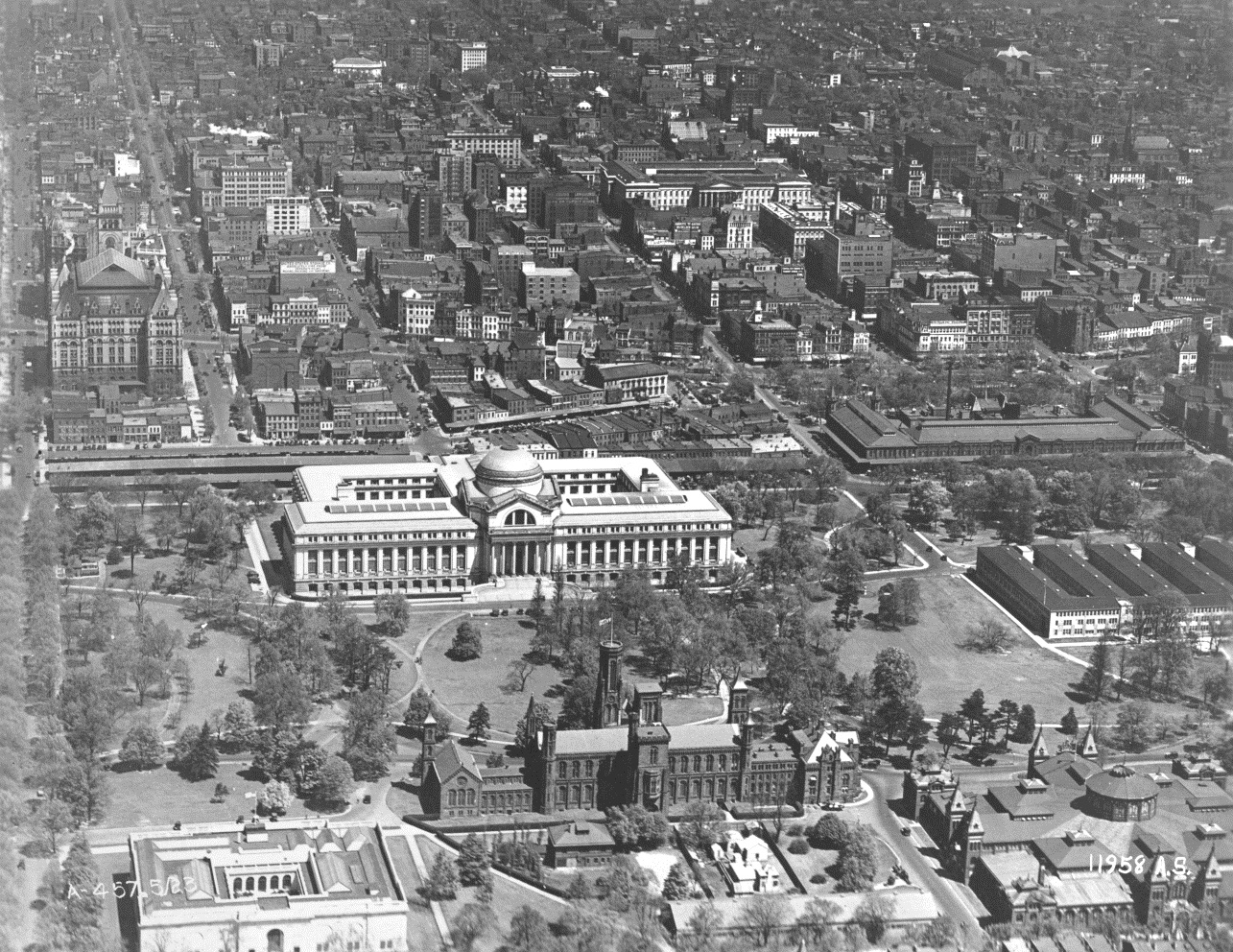
The Smithsonian Institution Building (bottom), the National Museum of Natural History in white and the Center Market (right) in 1929, prior to its demolition

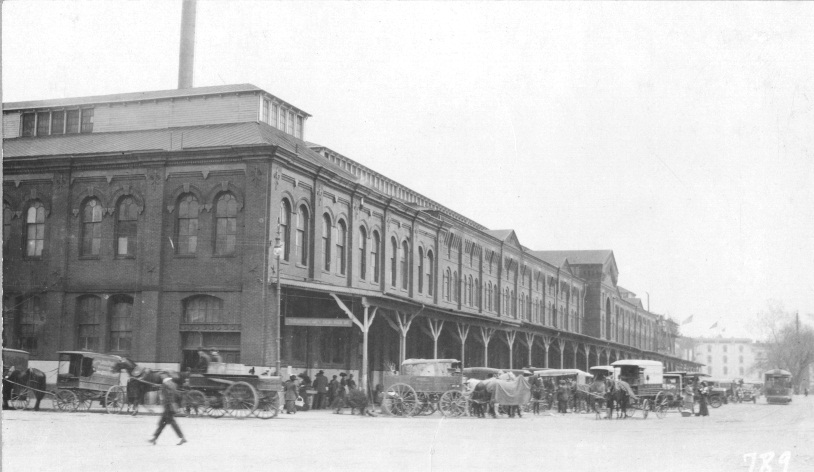
Center Market seen from B Street NW (Constitution Avenue) in 1914

Center Market was a market hall in Washington, D.C. designed by architect Adolph Cluss which operated in Washington, DC from 1872 to 1931. The building was demolished in 1931 to be replaced by the National Archives Building. A market called Center Market had been in operation on the same block of land since 1802. In 1931, the name of Center Market was transferred over to the Northern Liberty Market located a few blocks north.

== History ==
=== Early history ===
In 1797, President George Washington designated two acres in Washington City to be used as a public marketplace. On October 6, 1802, a City Council Ordinance is approved by Mayor Robert Brent to establish Center Market south of Pennsylvania Avenue NW, between 7th and 9th Streets NW. Section 5 of the Ordinance states "That no person shall sell or expose for sale in said market any unsound, blown, or unwholesome meat or articles of provision, under the penalty of five dollars for every offence."

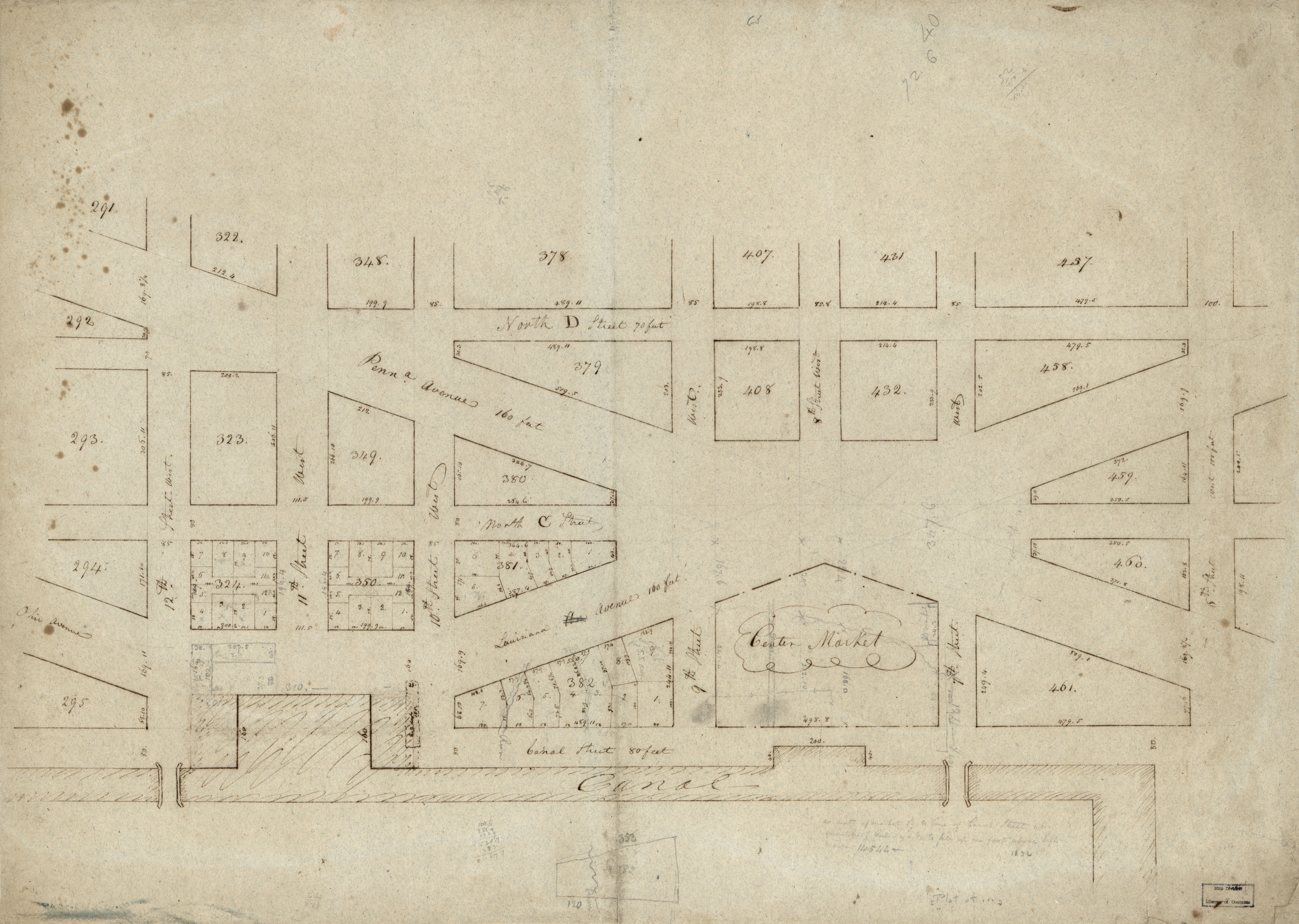
1836 cadastral map around the Center Market

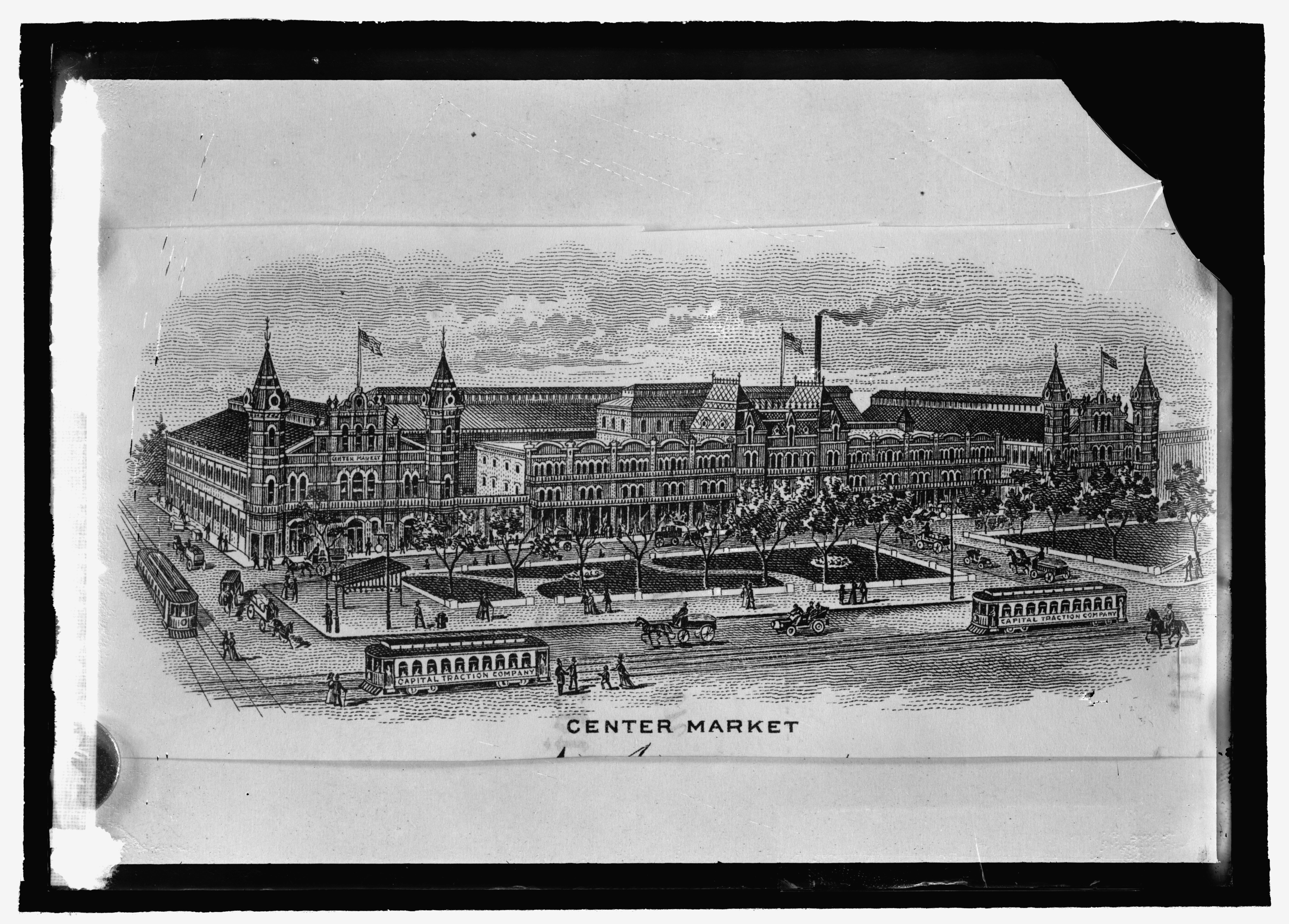
General view of the market

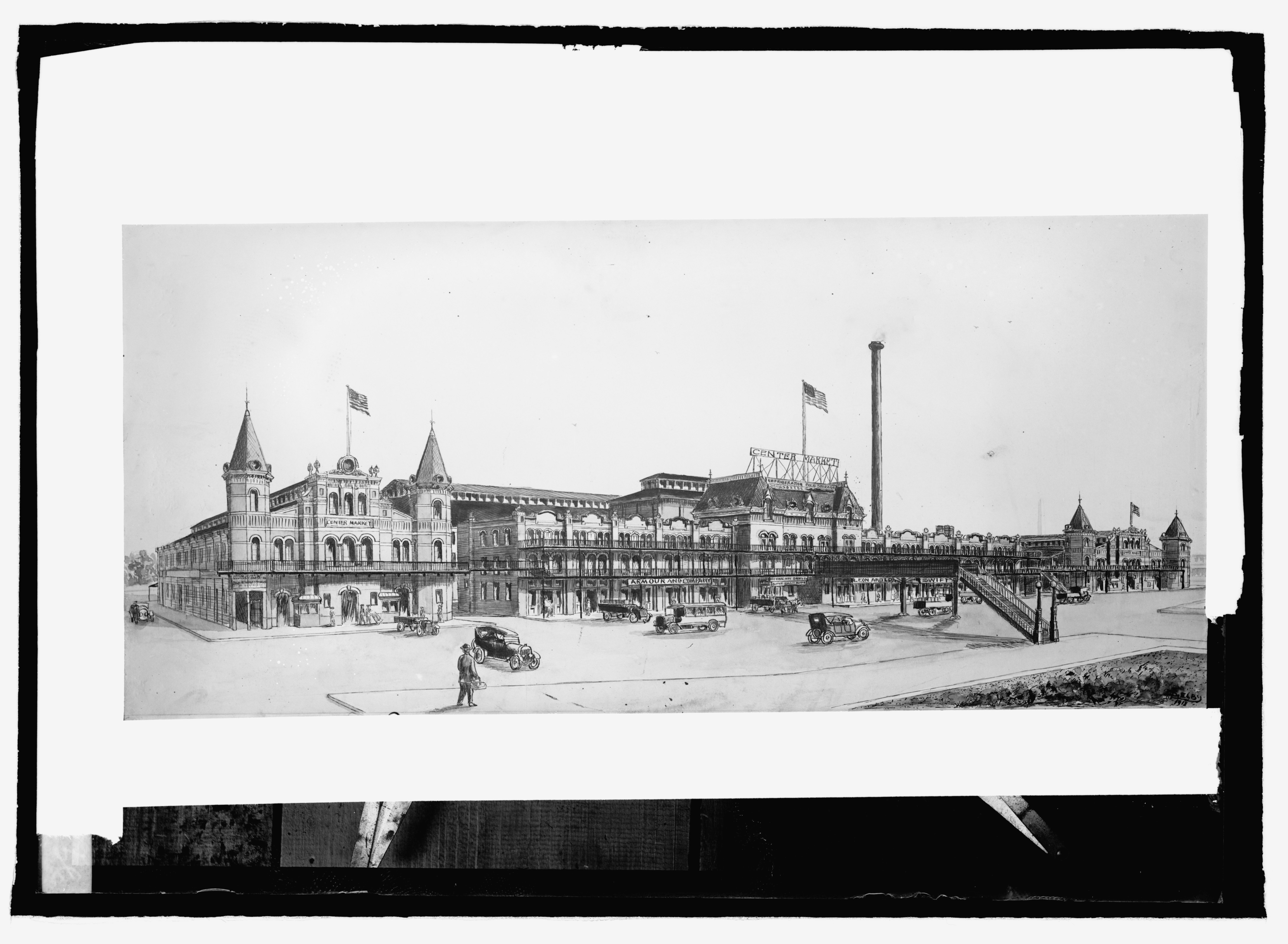
Detailed view of the Pennsylvania Avenue Side

The first Center Market opened soon after on this land by the Washington City Canal (now Constitution Avenue). It was a hub of commercial activity for the city and it is said that President Thomas Jefferson visited the market. Until the abolition of slavery in the District of Columbia in 1862, slaves were sold at the market. It then became a place of business for African Americans who owned some of the stalls and sold goods.

By 1850, the market was a mixture of frame buildings with no coherence though located in such a prestigious location between the White House and the Capitol. Despite its popularity and major importance in the local economy, Congress and the public considered the market a health and safety hazard with its 700 vendors in 1870. A new building was needed with better ventilation and drainage.

In 1863, Mayor Richard Wallach had Adolf Cluss and Joseph Wildrich von Kammerhueber design a brick structure on B Street NW (Constitution Avenue). A two-story building was designed and construction started. By June 1864, a unanimous vote from both the members of the House of Representatives District Committee and then the entire House of Representatives stopped the project as Congress had not authorized the building. It was torn down but the walls were already up and showed what a modern market could look like.

=== A new building ===
A new Center Market building was chartered and the company incorporated by an Act of Congress on May 20, 1870 and opened for business on July 1, 1872. It was designed by the same architect (Adolph Cluss) as the demolished building of 1864.

It was operated by the Washington Market Company with as first principal Officers:

- First President: Former 1st Governor of the District of Columbia Henry D. Cooke
- Second President: Former Mayor of Washington, DC Matthew G. Emery
- Third President: Nehemiah G. Ordway

At the time of its construction, it was the largest market hall in the country (57,500 square feet)—large enough to supply the rapidly growing urban population of D.C. with fresh groceries.

The 9th Street Wing and Arcade were added in 1888 nearly doubling the capacity of the structure. In the process, it also added mechanical refrigeration with 400,000 cubic feet of cold storage rooms for meats using 10 miles of heavy two-inch brine pipes and electric lighting machinery. A very tall chimney stood above the boiler room.

The architect unconventionally designed the market building without alleys or driveways for traffic; by doing so, he hoped to encourage customers to stroll leisurely around the market.

==== Layout ====
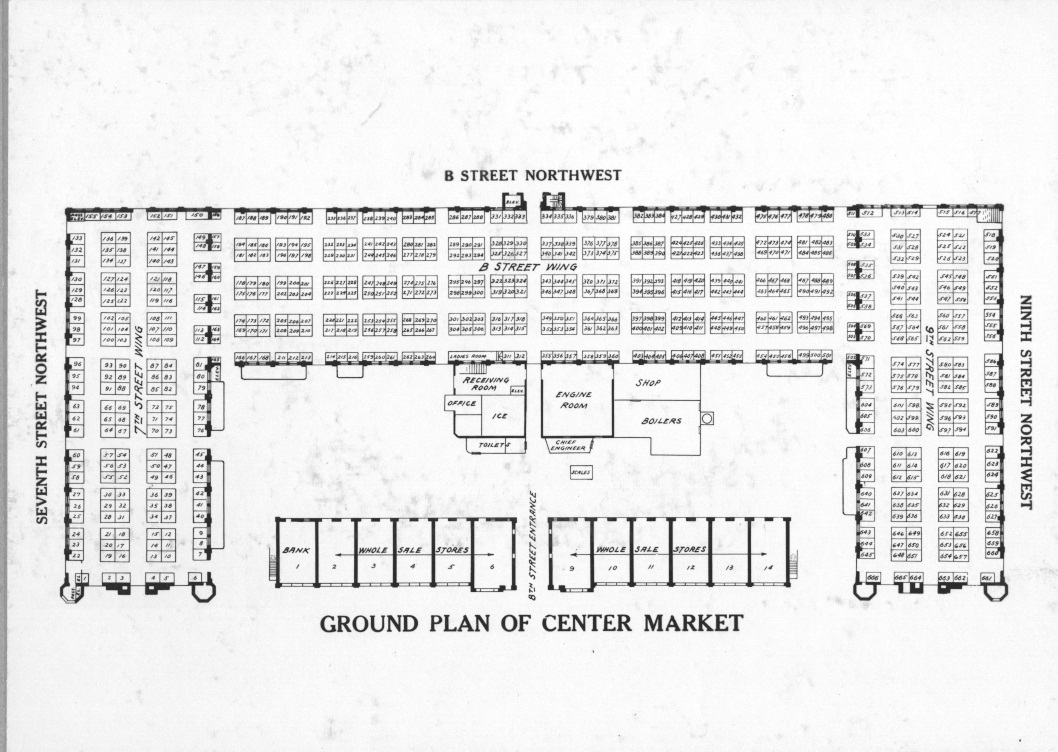
Plan of Center Market in 1924

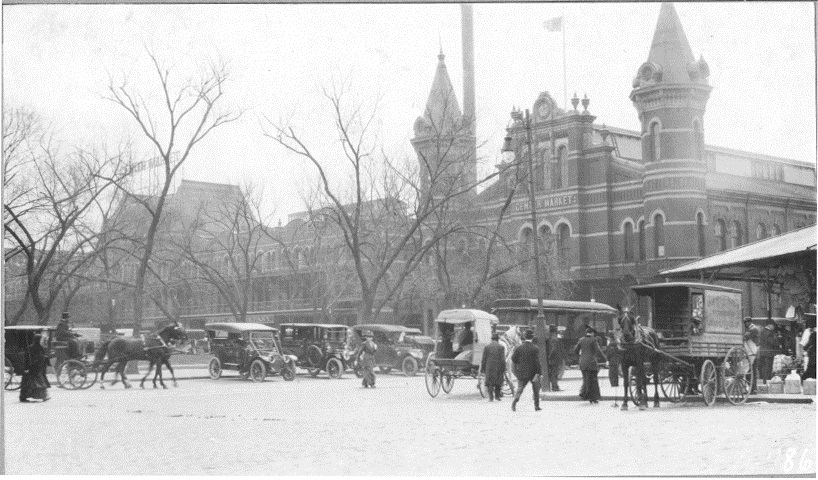
Center Market showing the front of the building and the 9th Street Wing in 1914

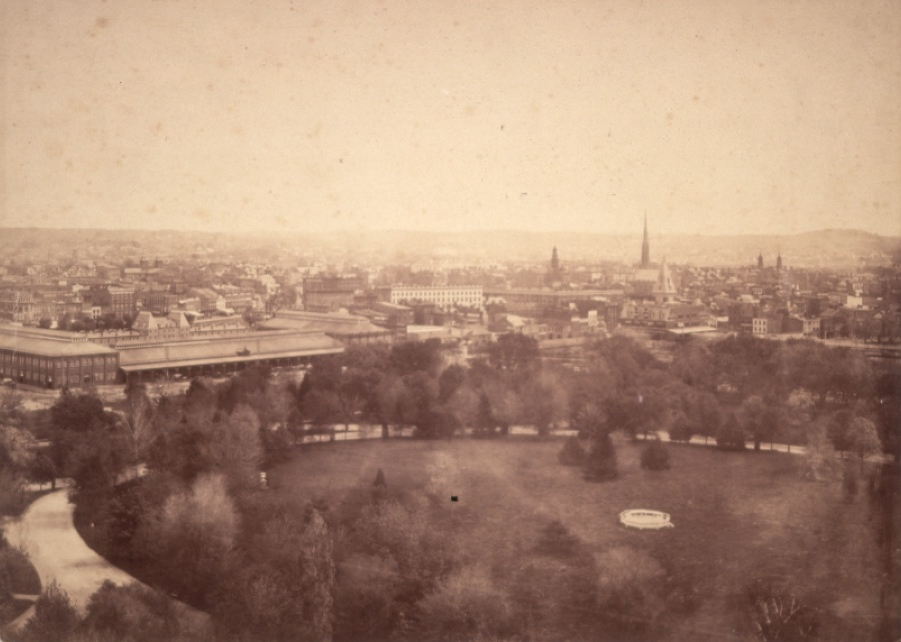
View of the back of the market (on the left) around 1879

The building had three wings connected to one another with a total of 666 stalls:

- the 7th Street Wing which ran parallel to 7th Street NW (stalls 1 to 155)
- the B Street Wing which ran parallel to B Street NW connecting the 7th Street Wing to the 9th Street Wing (stalls 156 to 511)
- the 9th Street Wing which ran parallel to 9th Street NW (stalls 512 to 666)

These three wings formed a U. An additional structure stood separate with 12 wholesale stores and a bank in the area left vacant on the lot.

A Plaque posted in front of the building provided extensive details on the building:

- 7th St. Wing: 200 ft x 78 ft
- 9th St. Wing: 200 ft x 78 ft
- B St. Wing: 344 ft x 84 ft
- Arcade building (12 wholesale stores): 274 ft x 40 ft
- North Center Wing: 32 ft x 42 ft
- Boiler and Pump House connections: 24 ft x 34 ft
- Iron buildings for brine tanks: 32 ft x 41 ft and electric light machinery 29 ft x 41 ft
- Eight hydraulic elevators for conveying products to and from Cold Storage rooms
- Six artesian wells yielding pure cold water
- Total number of stalls inside Main Market: 666
- Iron booths under awnings: 34
- Spaces for farmer's tables on side walls: 100
- Wagon spaces for actual producers in interior of Market grounds or on curbs: 200
- Total number of spaces when fully occupied by retail dealers: 1000
- Area used for market purposes, exclusive of courts and drives: 2 1/4 acres

All the buildings were two stories high and the 7th Street Wing and the 9th Street Wing were both flanked with two towers and a metal awning over the main entrances. Another metal awning ran the entire length of B Street NW and 9th Street NW. These protected shoppers visiting the outdoors stalls. For a small fee, street dealers could place their stands outside, under the market canopy.

A small park with trees stood between the buildings and Pennsylvania and Louisiana Avenue. From 1880 to 1931, the Rawlins Statue stood in the triangular lot where the two avenues intersect.

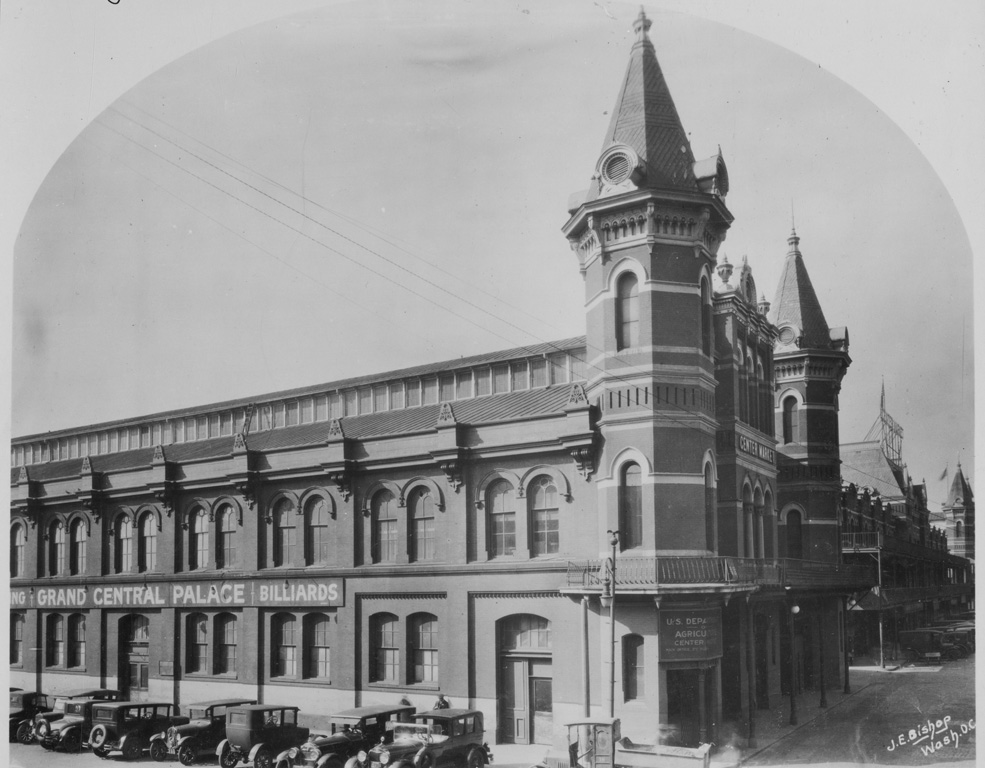
The 7th Street Wing - 1928

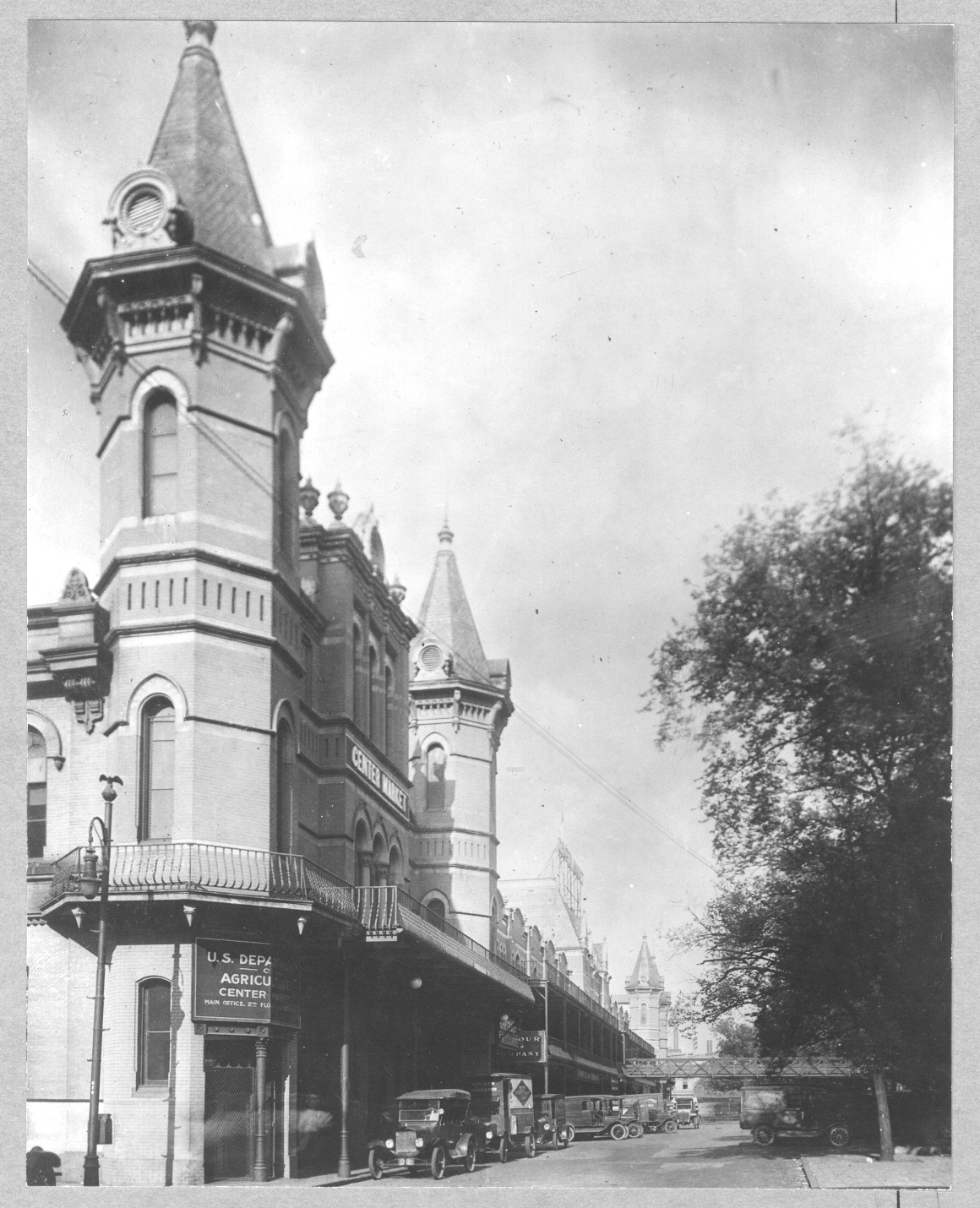
the Center Market Tower on 7th Street Northwest

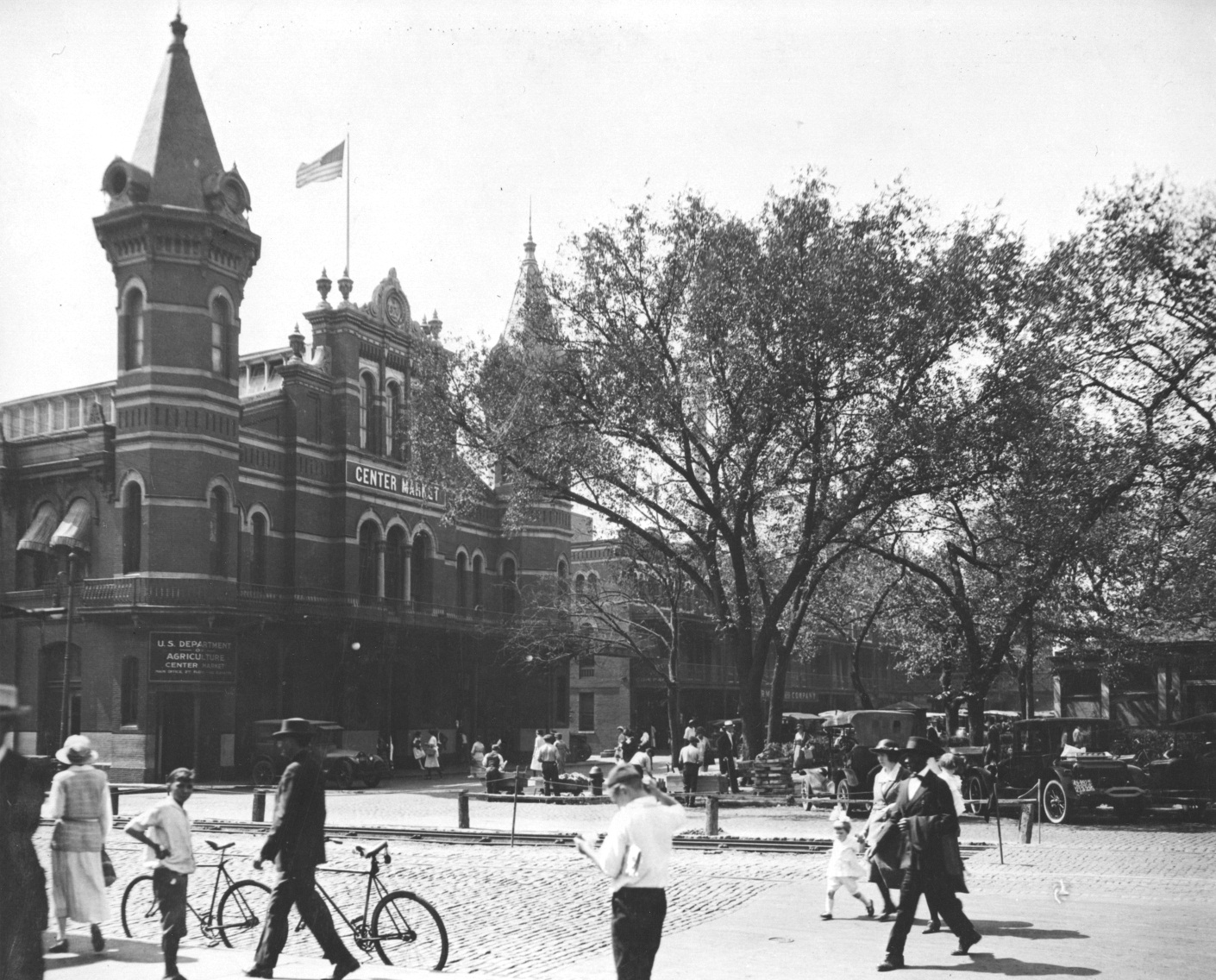
7th Street Entrance - 1922

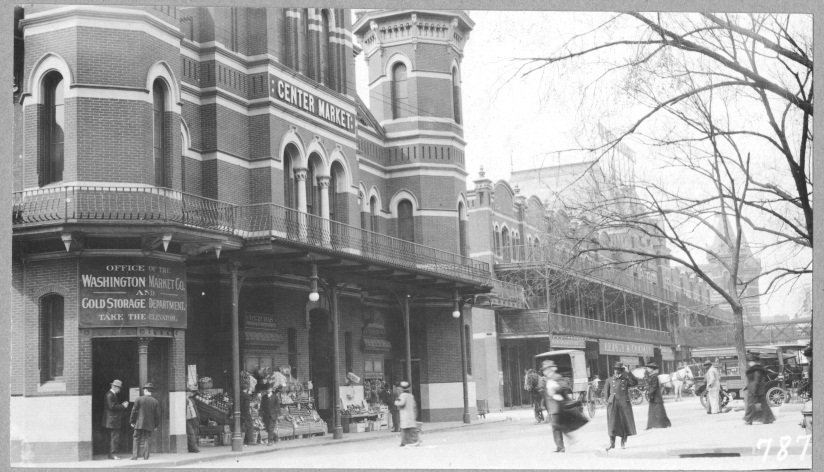
7th Street entrance and the wholesales stores in 1914

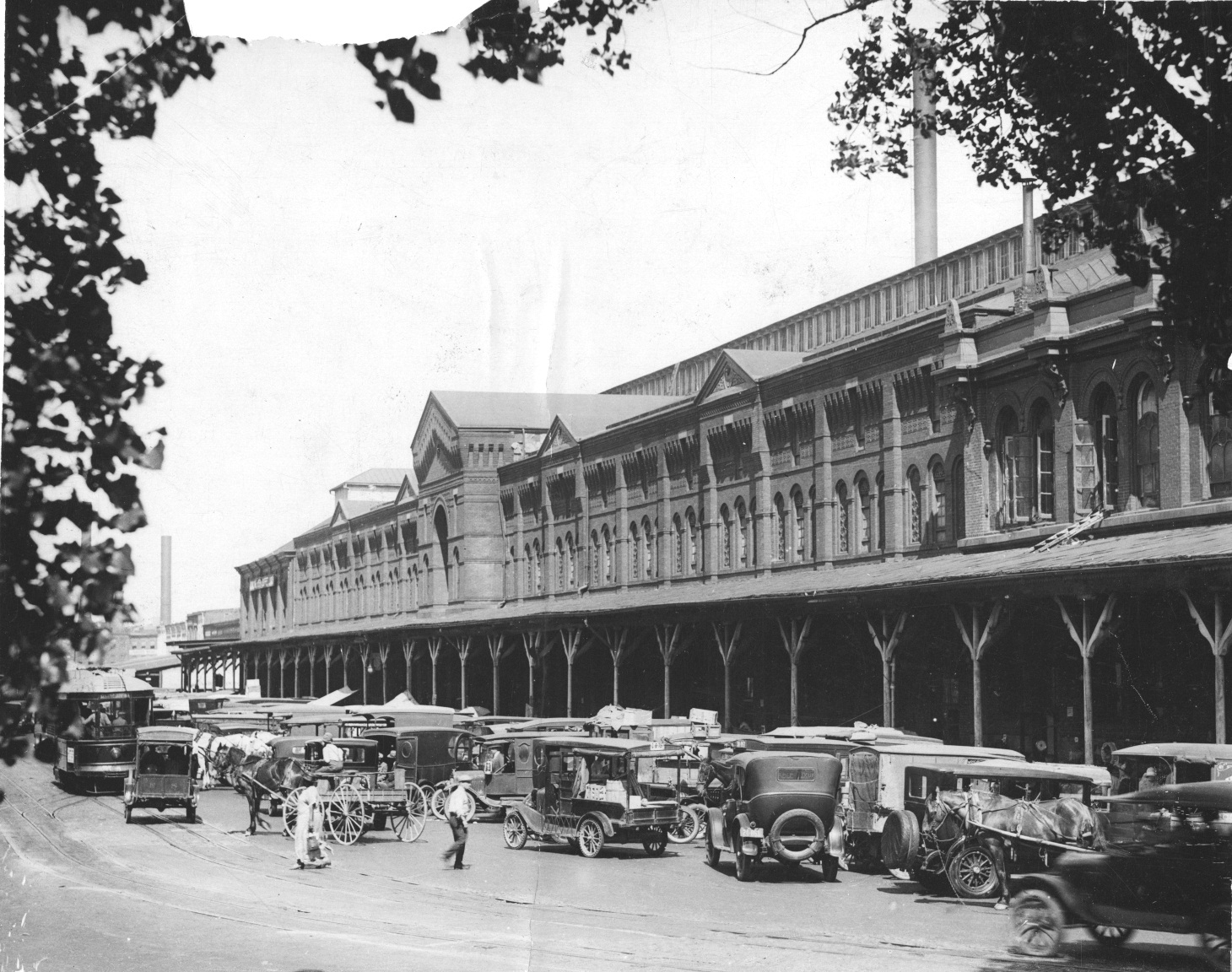
Vendors along the B Street Wing (Constitution Avenue)

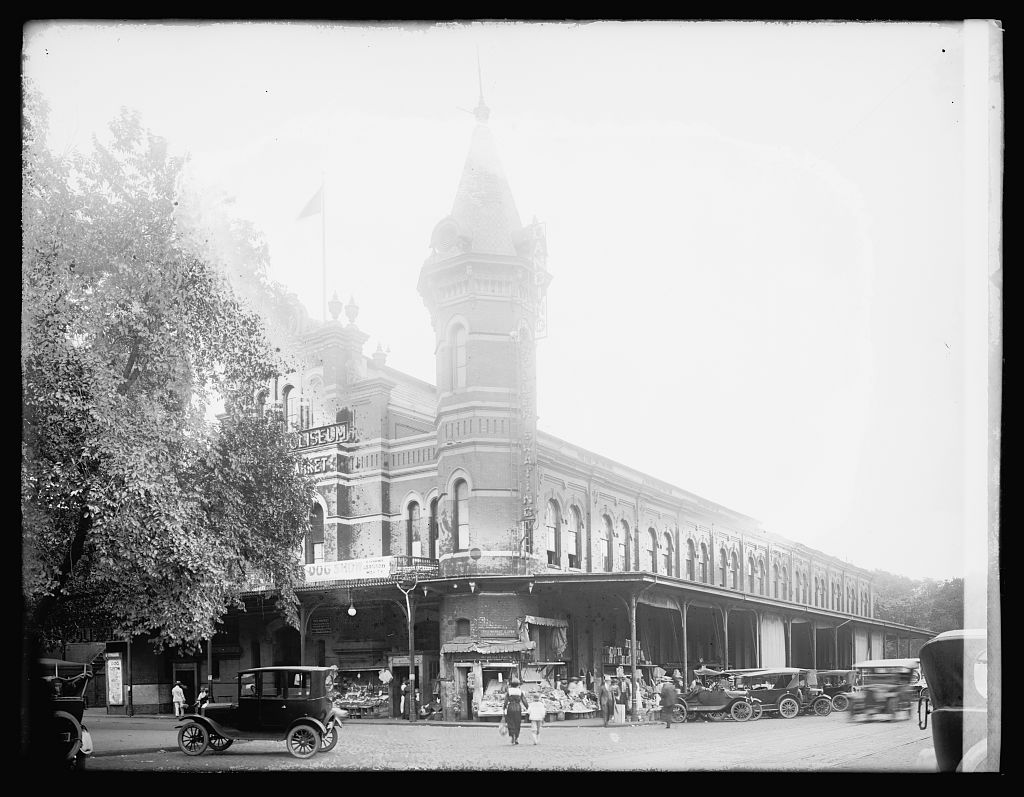
The 9th Street entrance

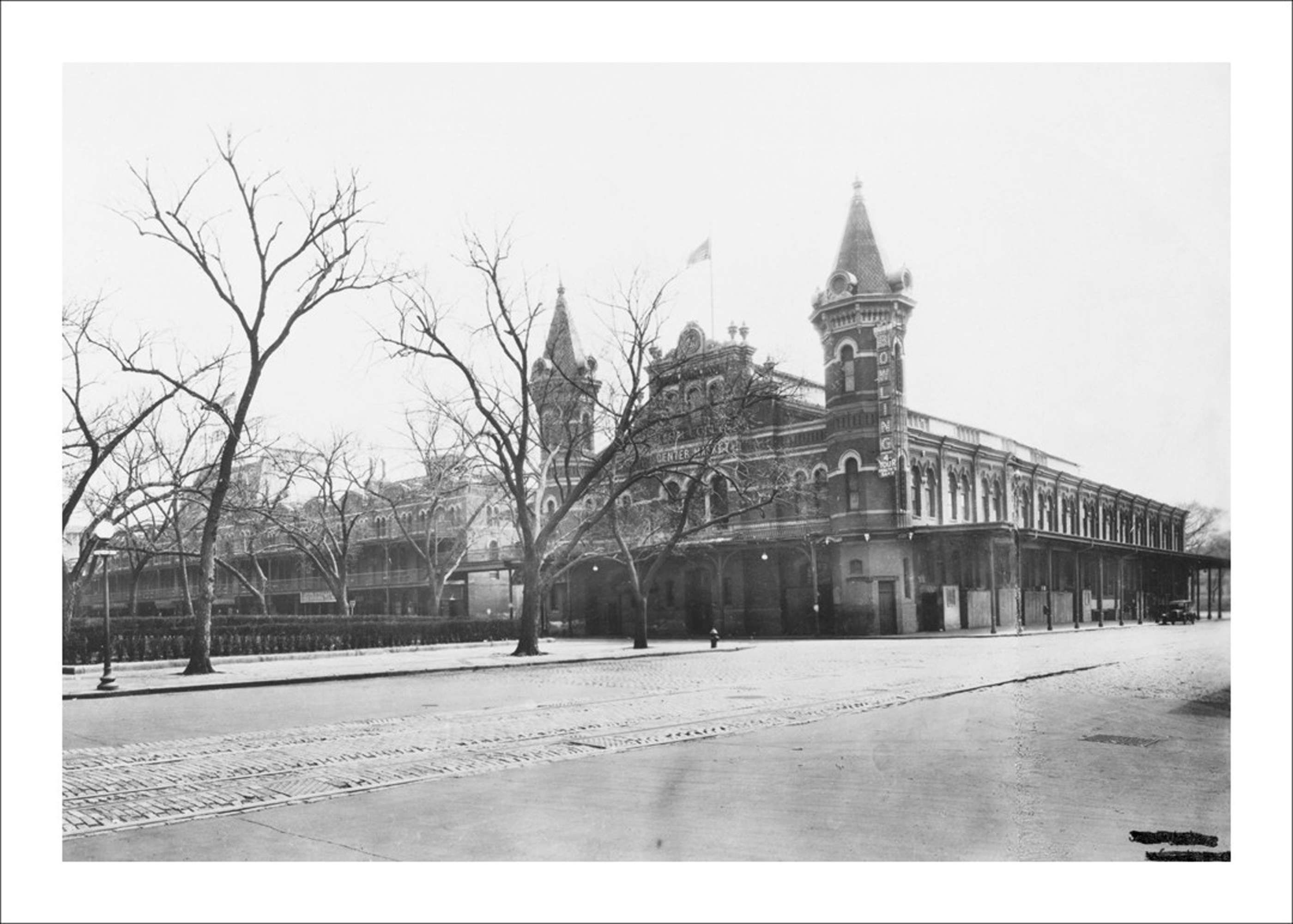
the 9th Street Wing around 1928

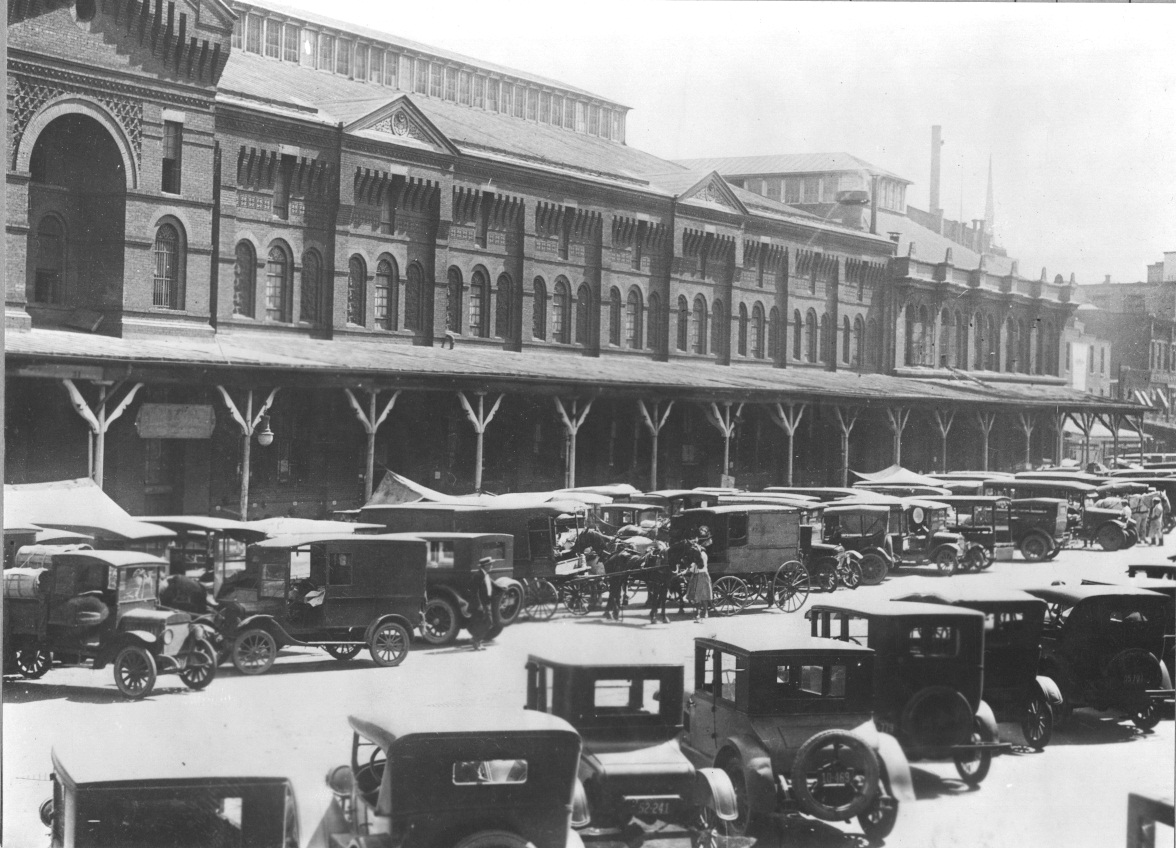
Photograph of the Farmers Line Outside of Center Market

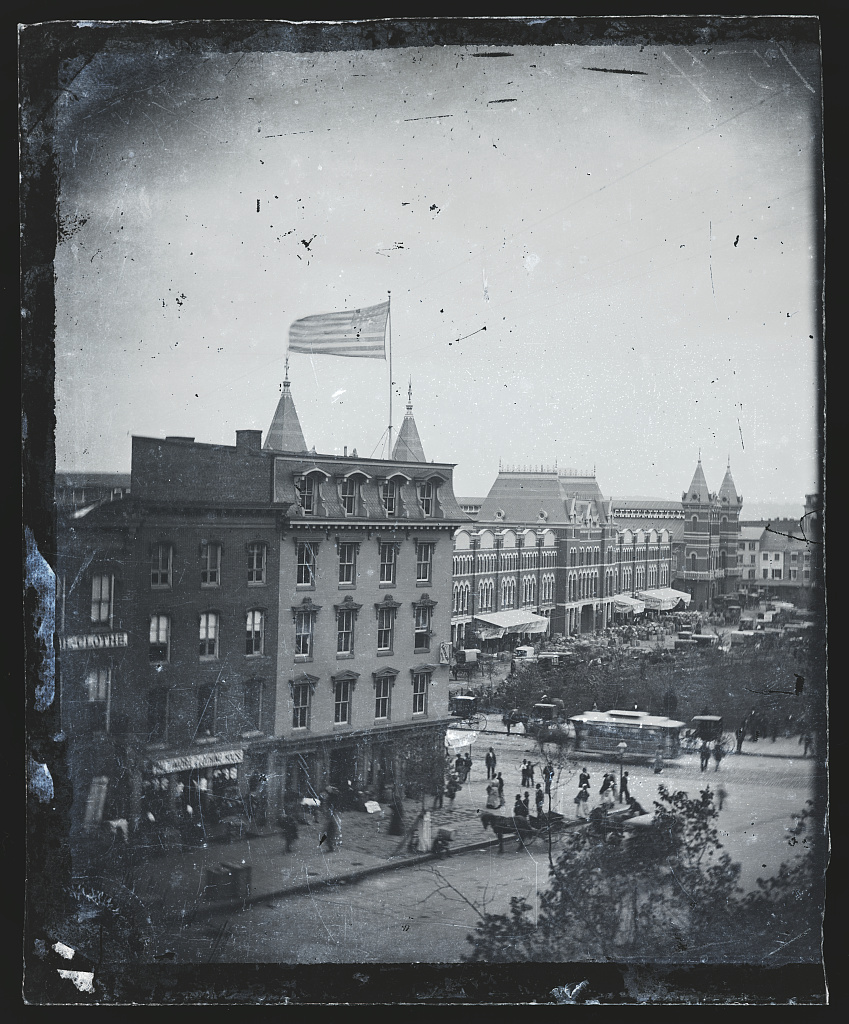
From Brady's Studio, on Pennsylvania Avenue & 7th Street NW looking toward Center Market in 1880

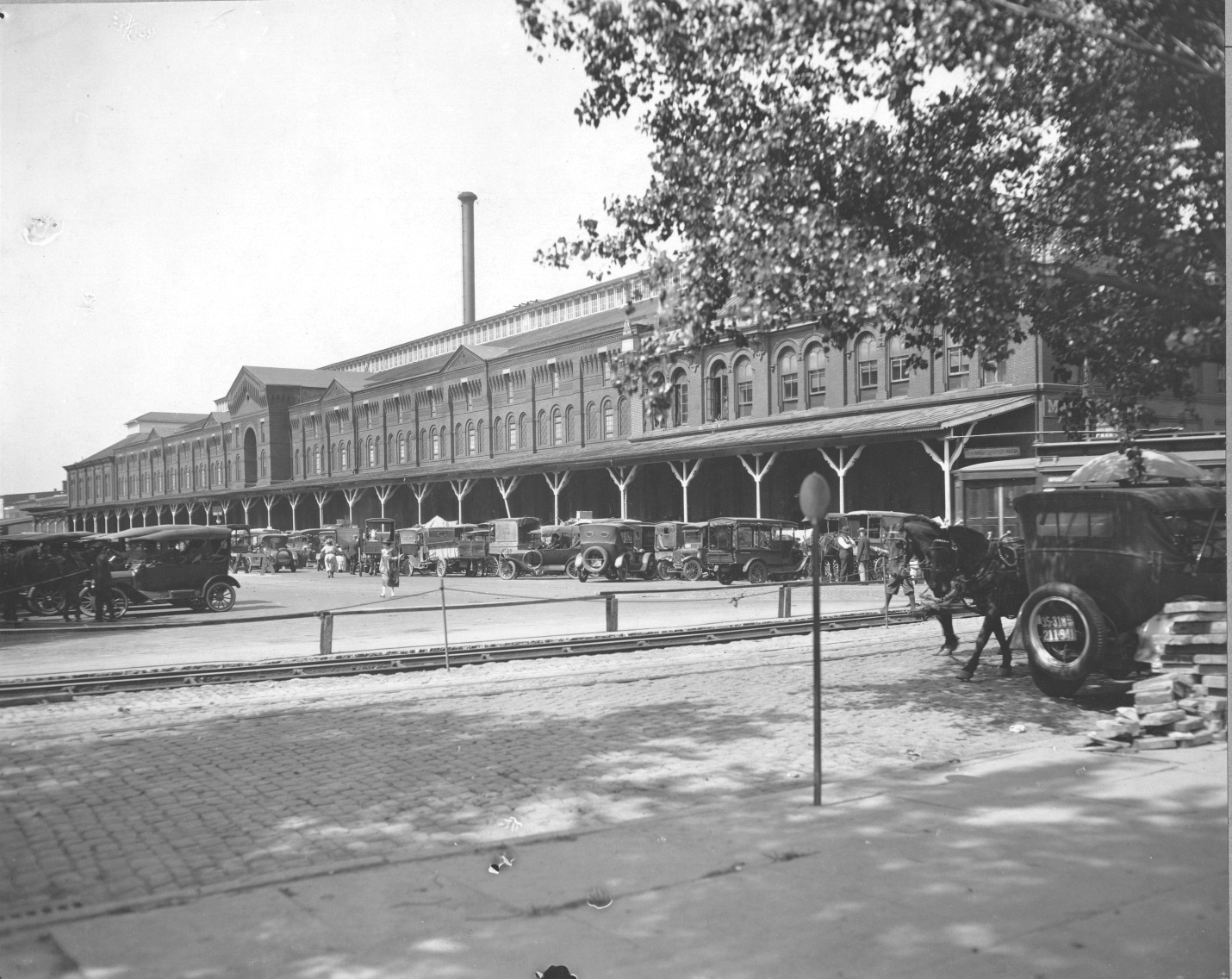
Photograph of the Farmers Line Outside of Center Market

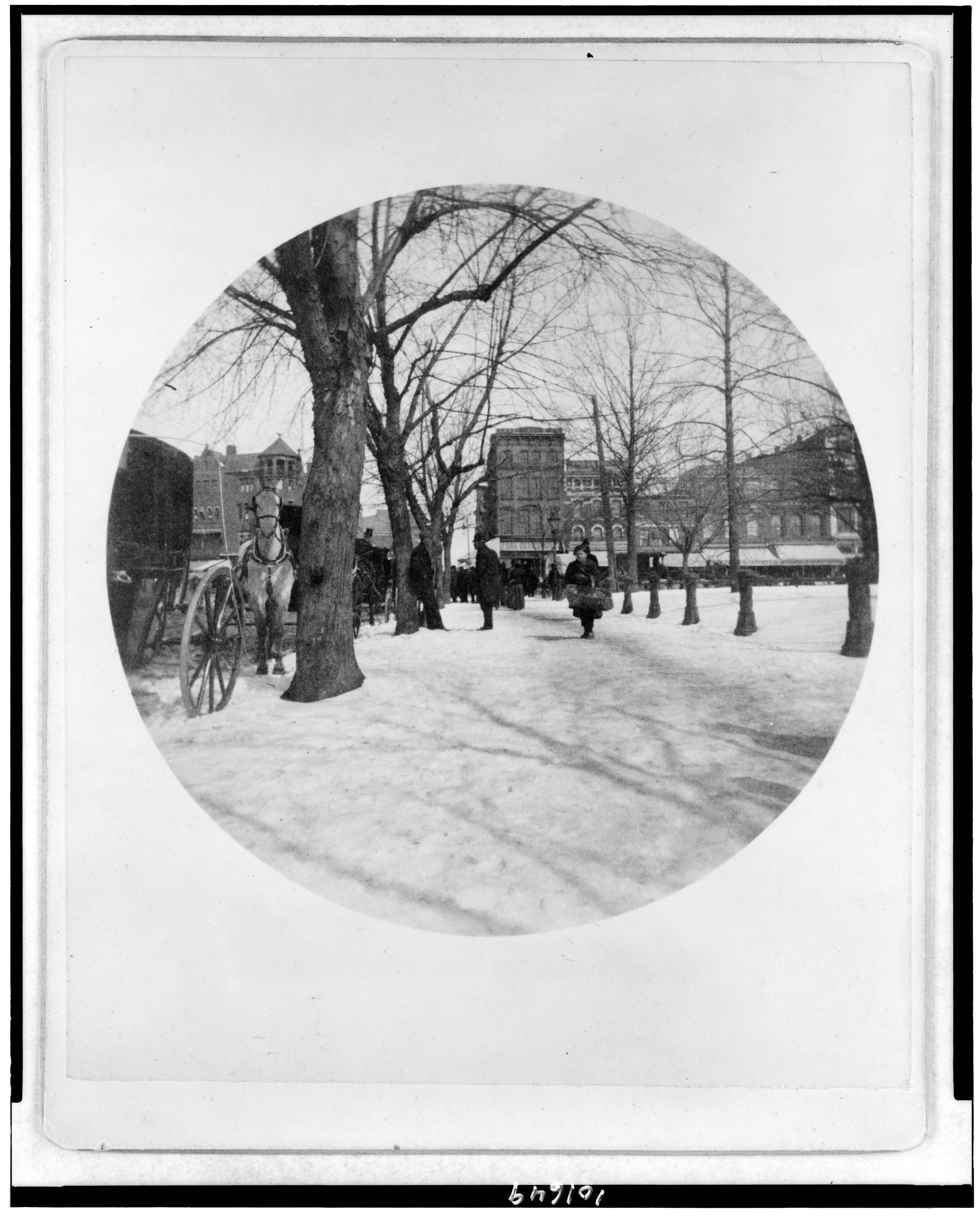
Photo shows the north side of Pennsylvania Avenue with Center Market forming the backdrop for this snowy shopping scene

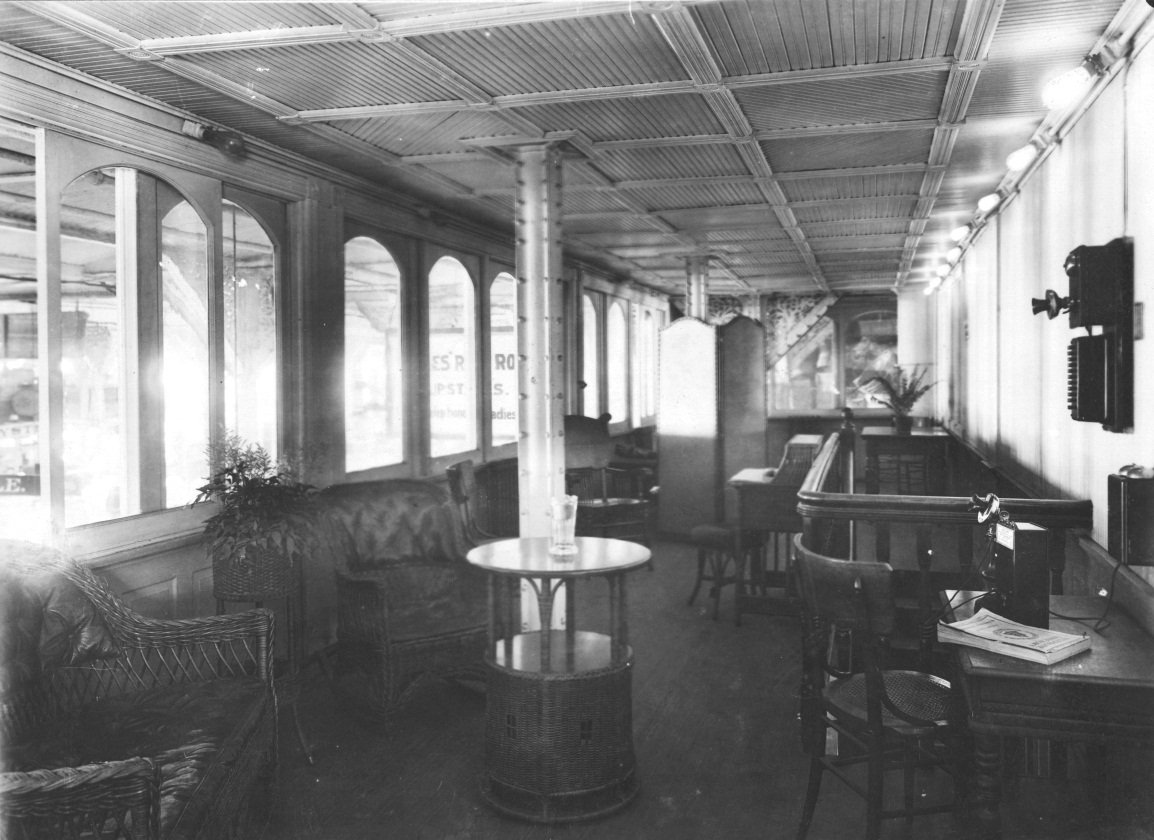
Photograph of a Ladies' Rest Room in Center Market, 1917

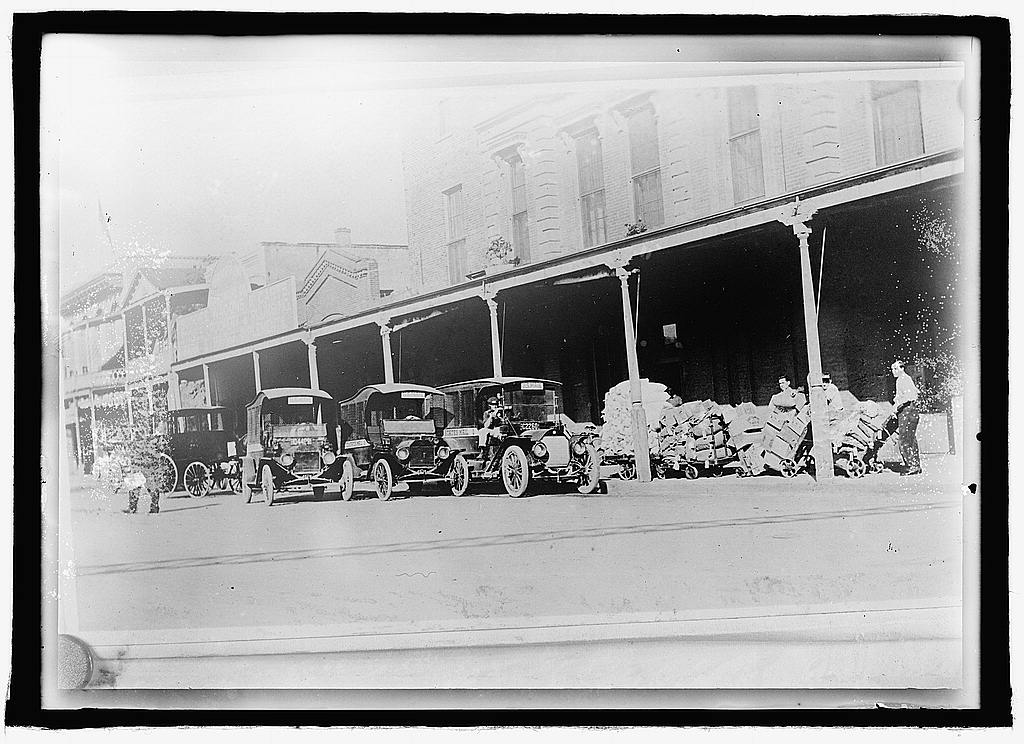
Exterior part of the Market

==== Services ====
Inside the building, customers could buy all their groceries in Center Market. Stalls of meats, fish, vegetables, condiments as well as flowers were available to serve them. Cold rooms provided storage of meats and other perishables and all dealers had storage on site for their produces. Good for sale were put on display on stands tiled with white subway tiles for cleanliness.

Customers could also use the Cold Storage Department to use the fur room where items such as dressed furs, carpets, rugs and other garments could be stored in order to protect them from moths and other insects that could destroy them.

Artesian wells provided fresh pure water for refrigerating purposes as well as the manufacturing of ice. This was extremely important considering houses did not have refrigerators at the time and used ice to preserve food.

Outside the building, other vendors sold similar produces but did not have access to the same storage facilities as inside.

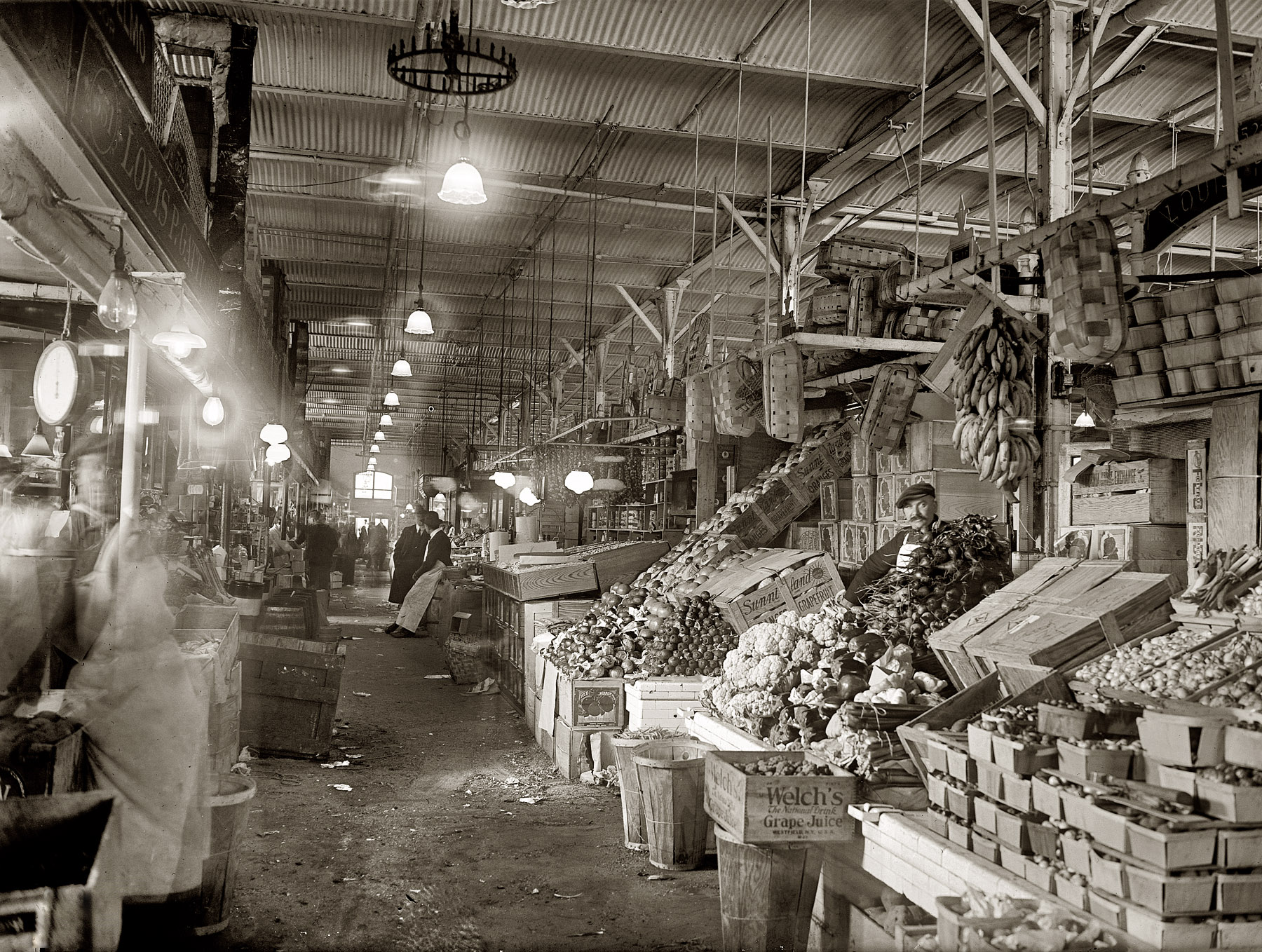
Produce section at the Center Market in Washington, D.C. On the left is Louis P. Gatti's fruit and vegetable stand.

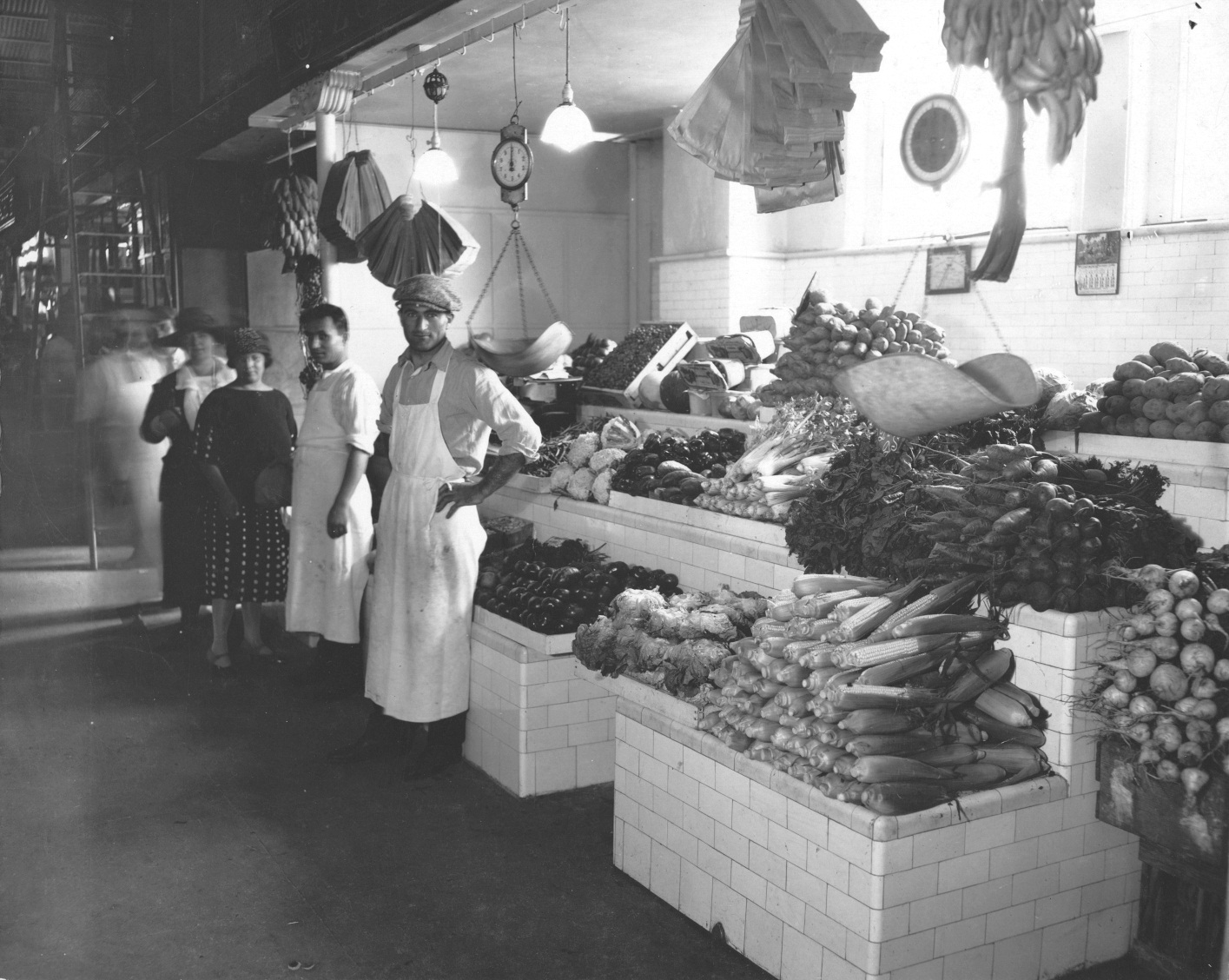
A fruit and vegetable stand in Center Market in 1922

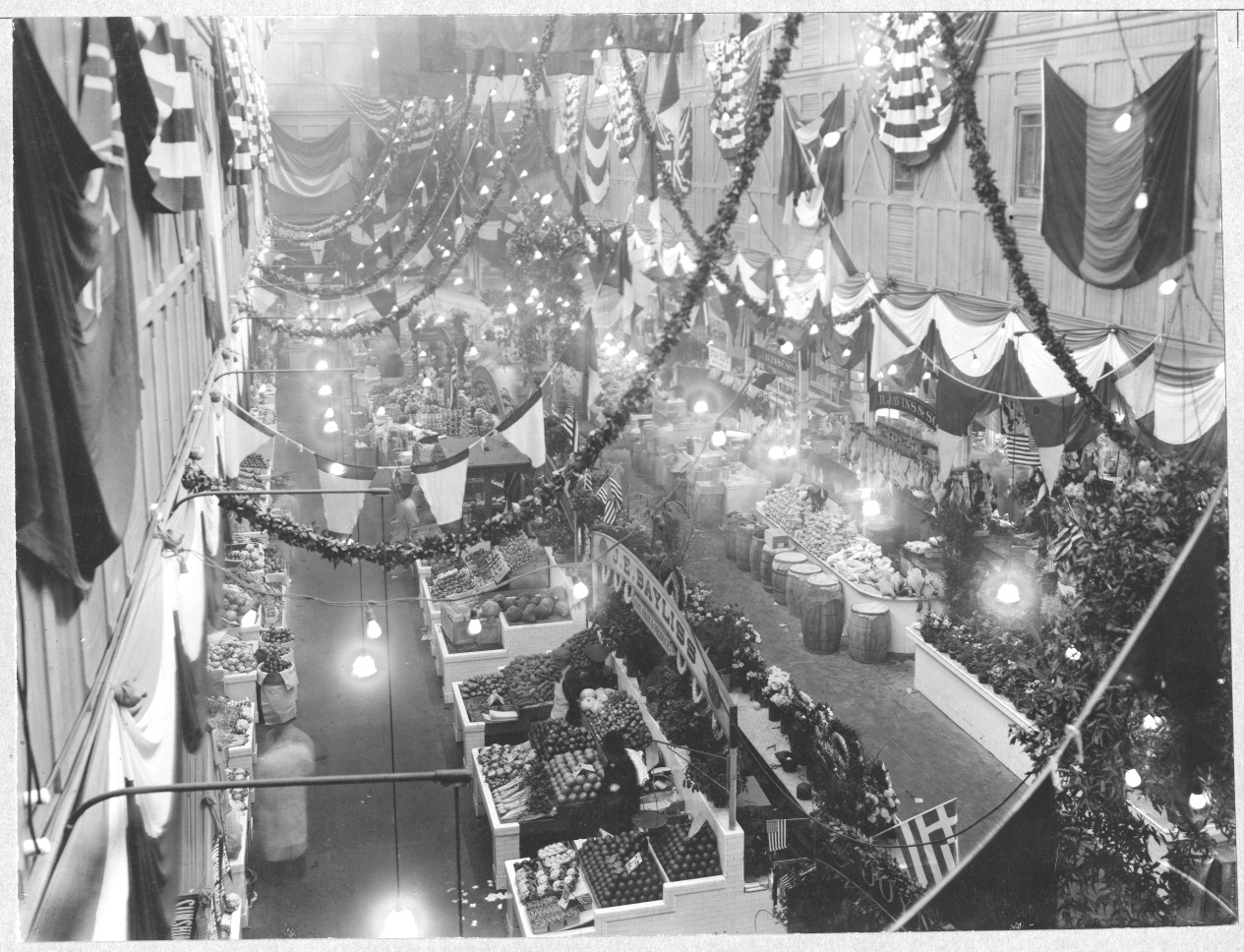
A part of the fruit and vegetable section in the B Street Wing in 1915

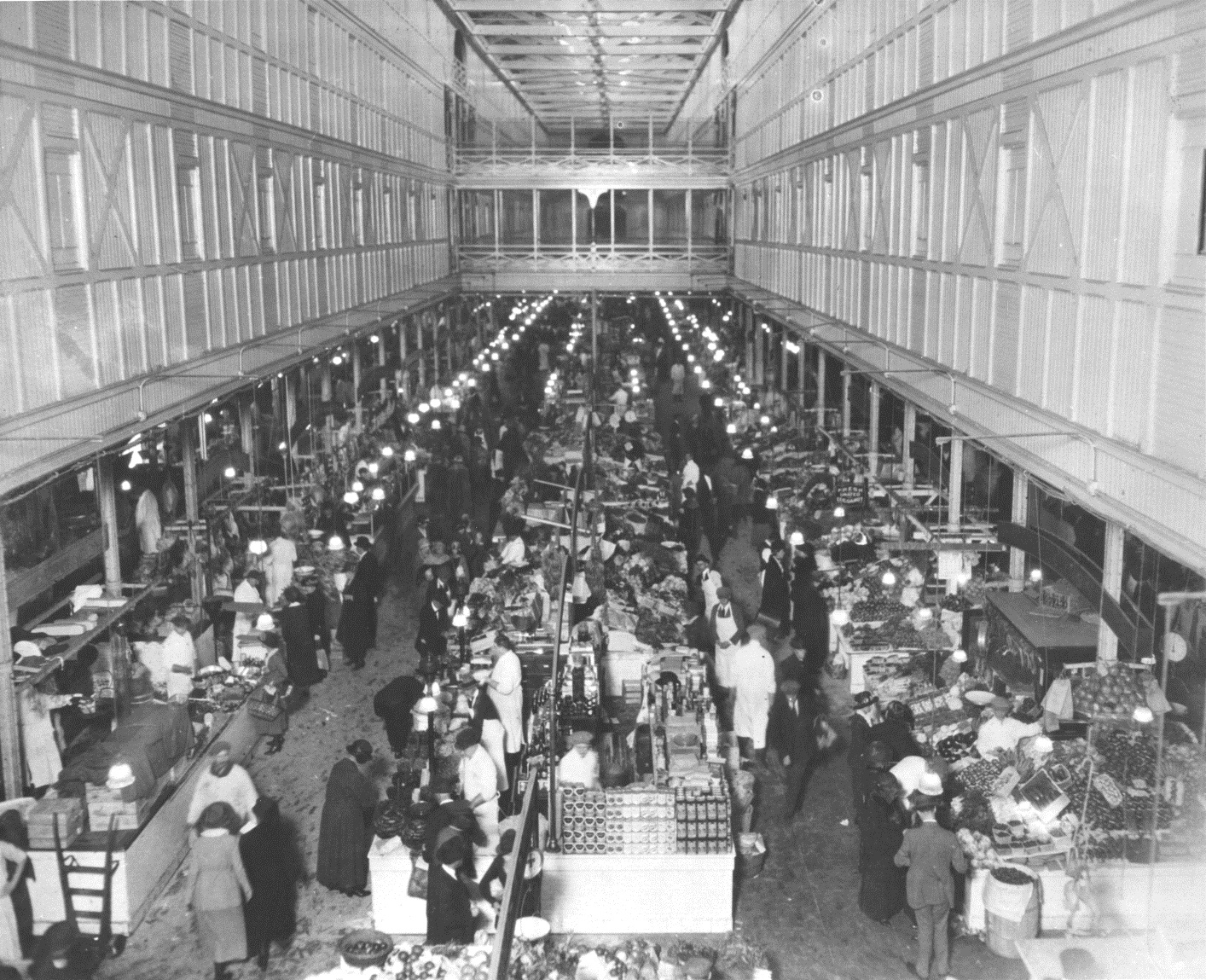
Interior of Center Market in 1923

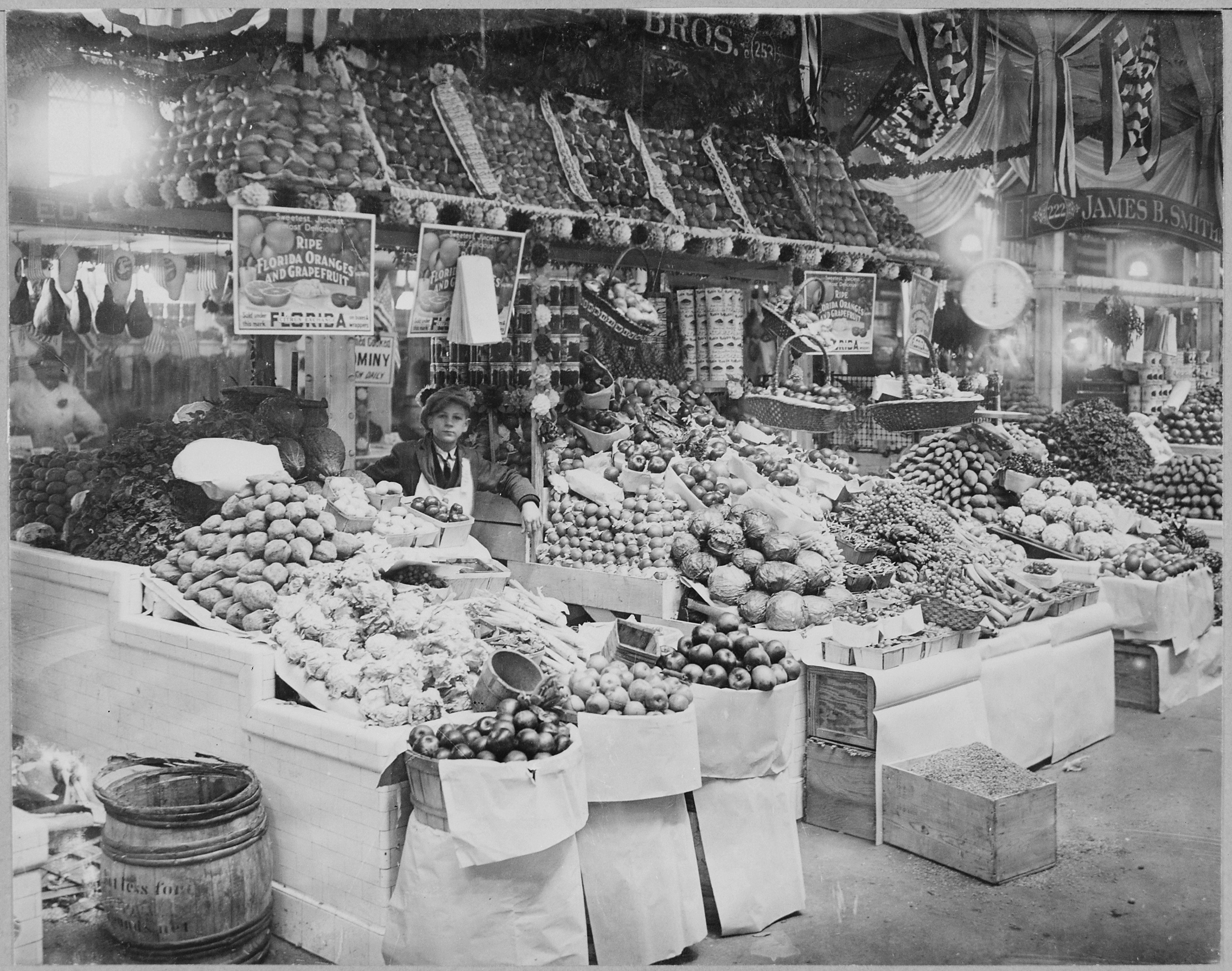
Stand 253 (B Street Wing) - Young boy tending freshly stocked fruit and vegetable stand at Center Market on February 18, 1915

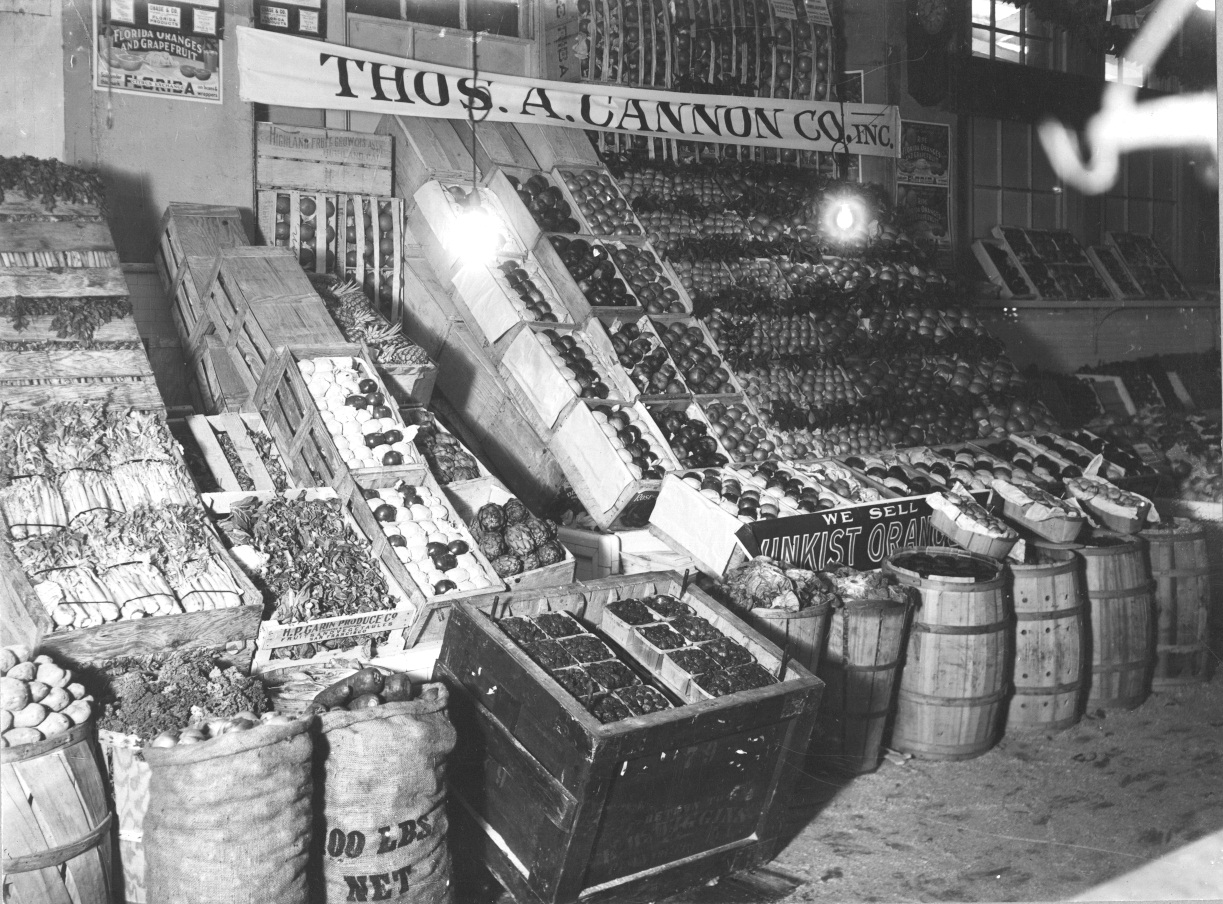
A combined wholesale and retail stand in Center Market. Note the great variety and attractiveness of the products. See iced refrigerator box of Florida strawberries in foreground, also Florida celery and tomatoes, and California cauliflower and artichoke

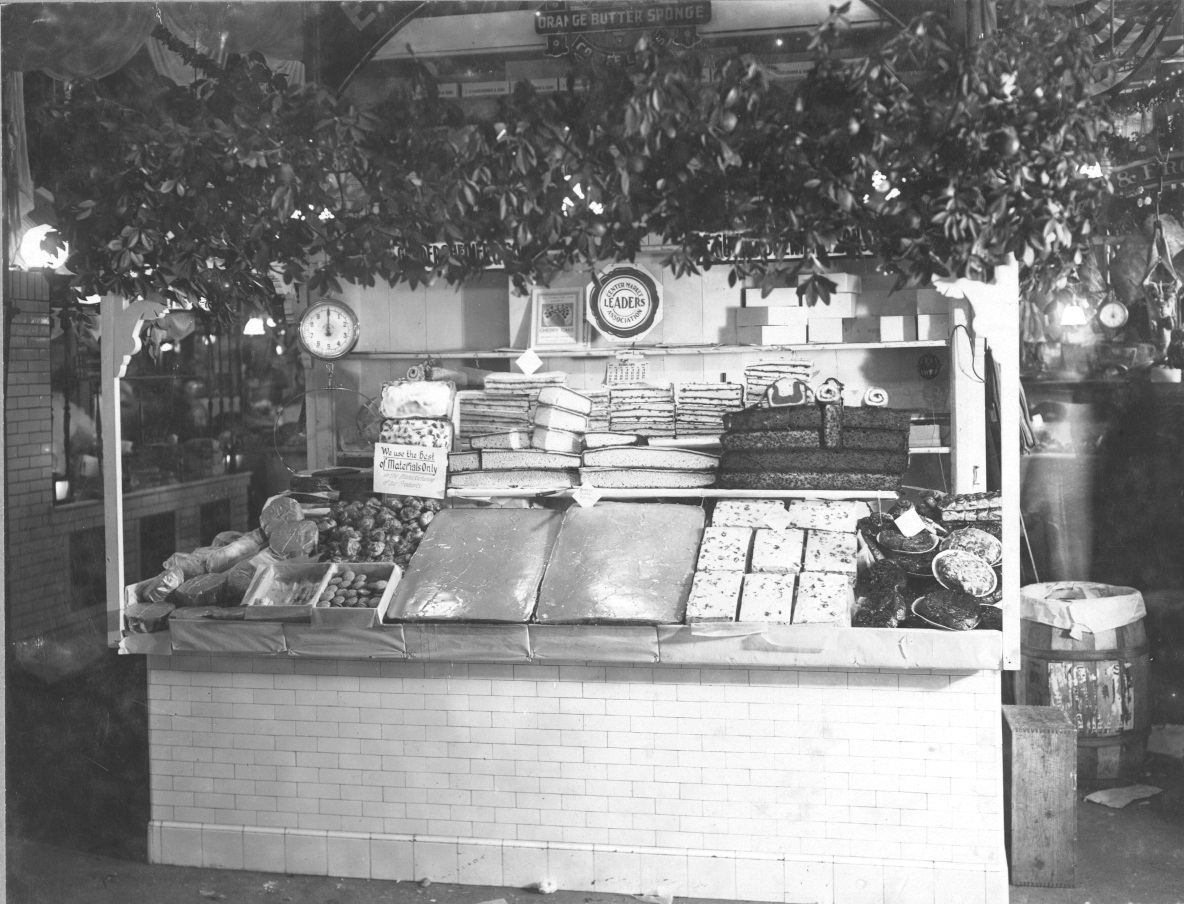
A stand in 1915

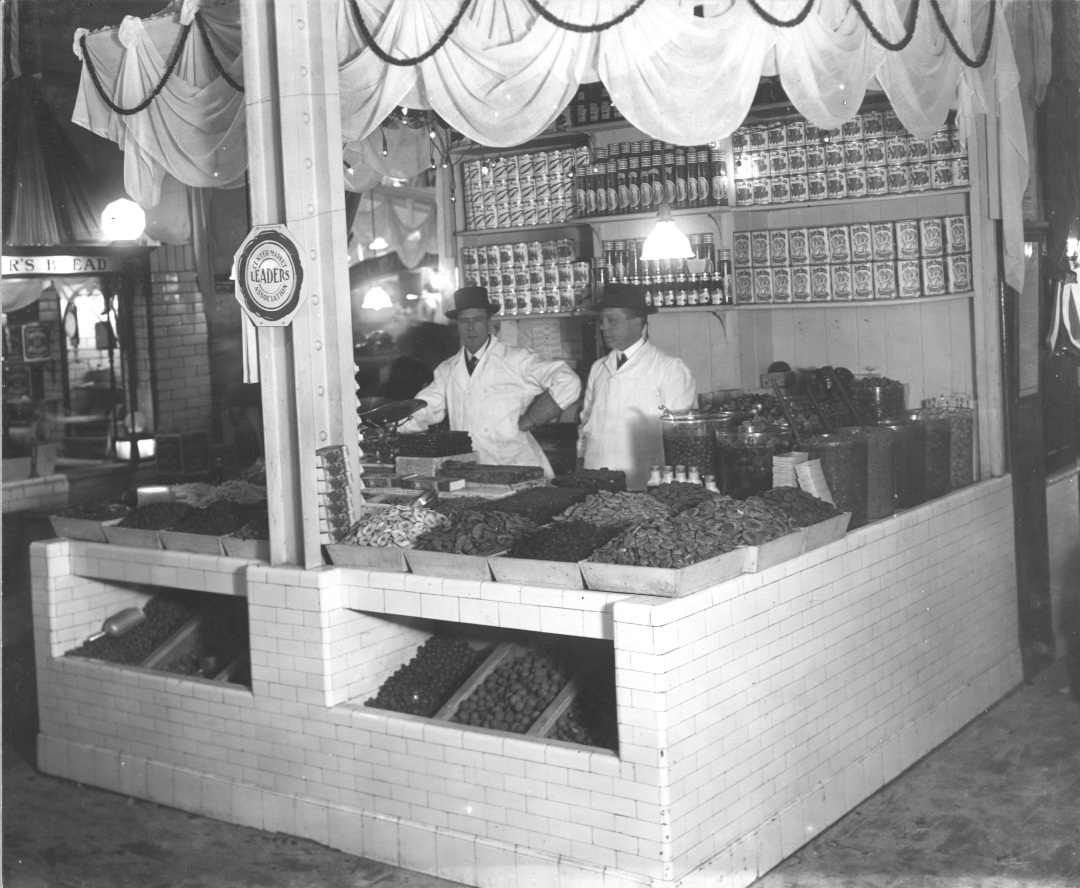
Dried-Fruit and Condiment Stand in Center Market in 1915

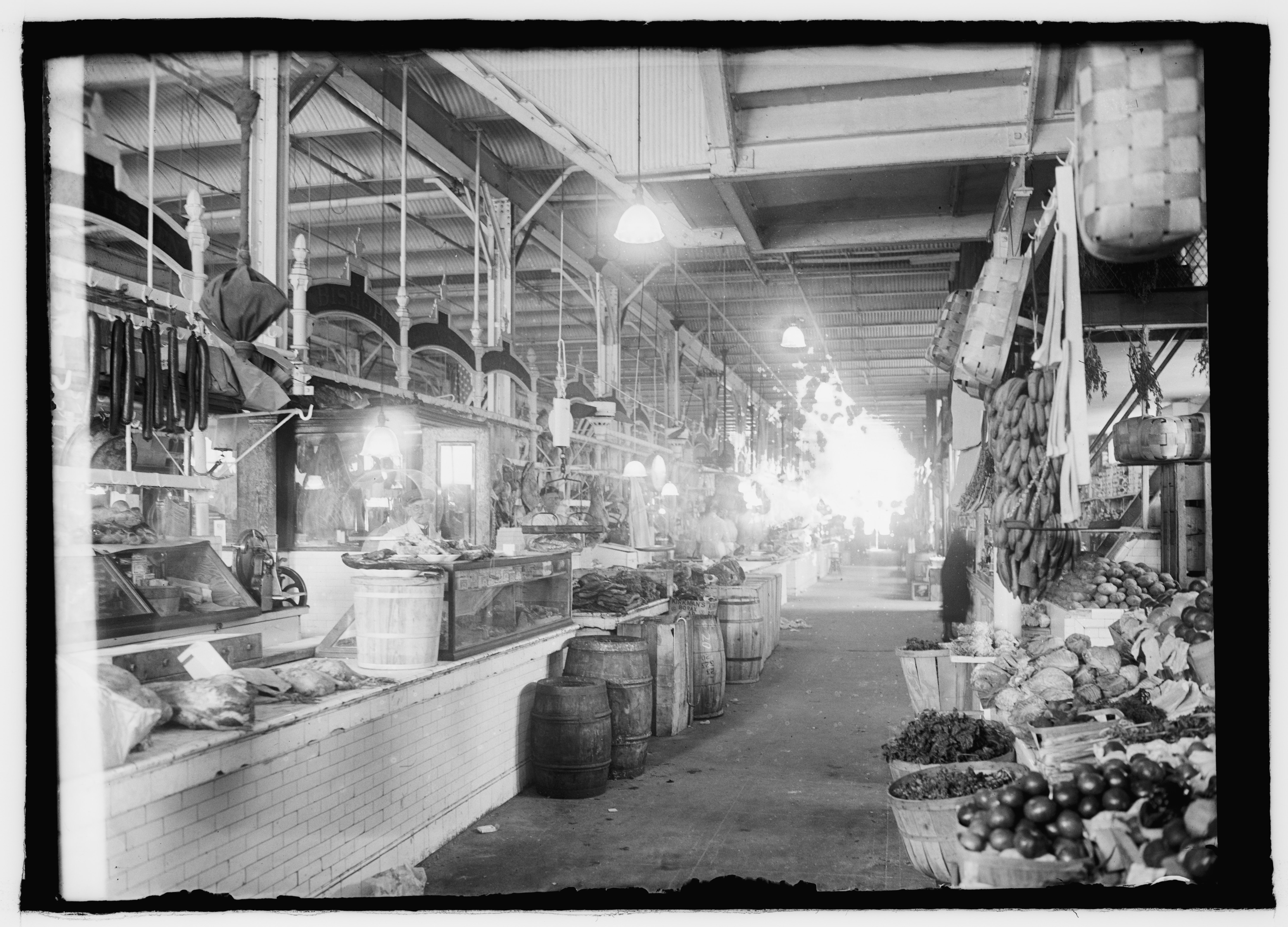
Center market stand in 1922

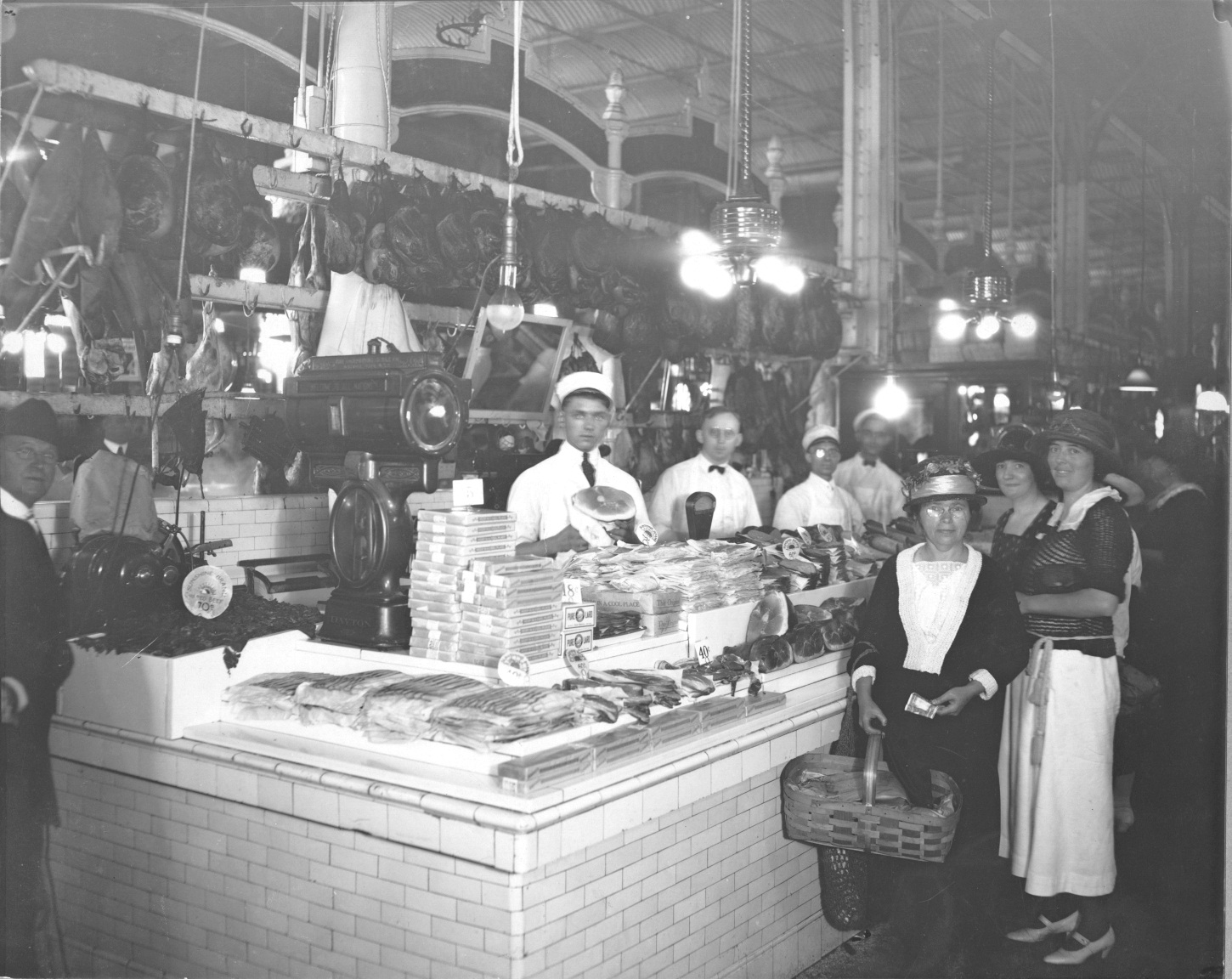
Attractive Display of Cured Meats in Center Market - 1922

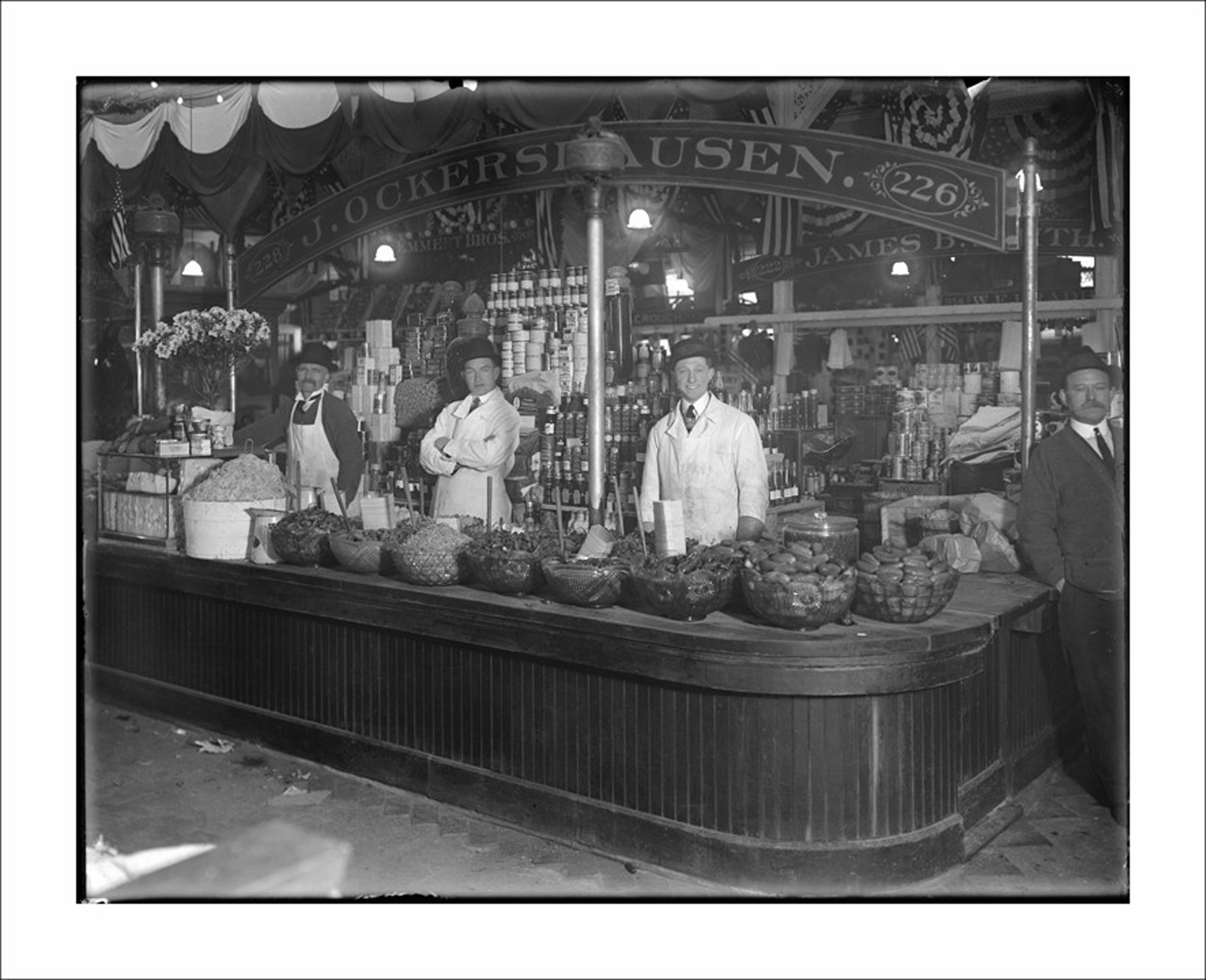
Stand 226 (B Street Wing) - Condiment Stand

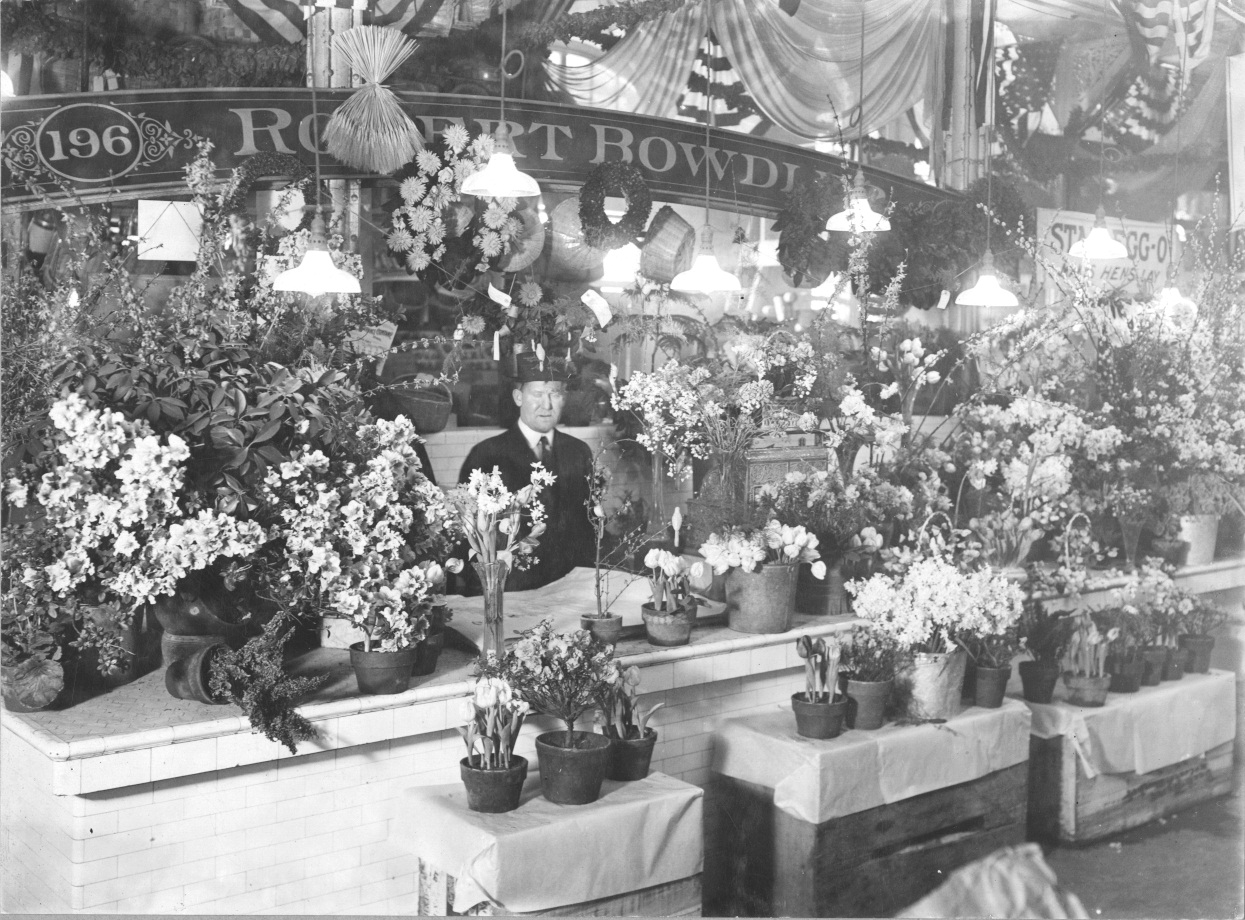
Stand 196 (B Street Wing) - Flower Stand - 1915

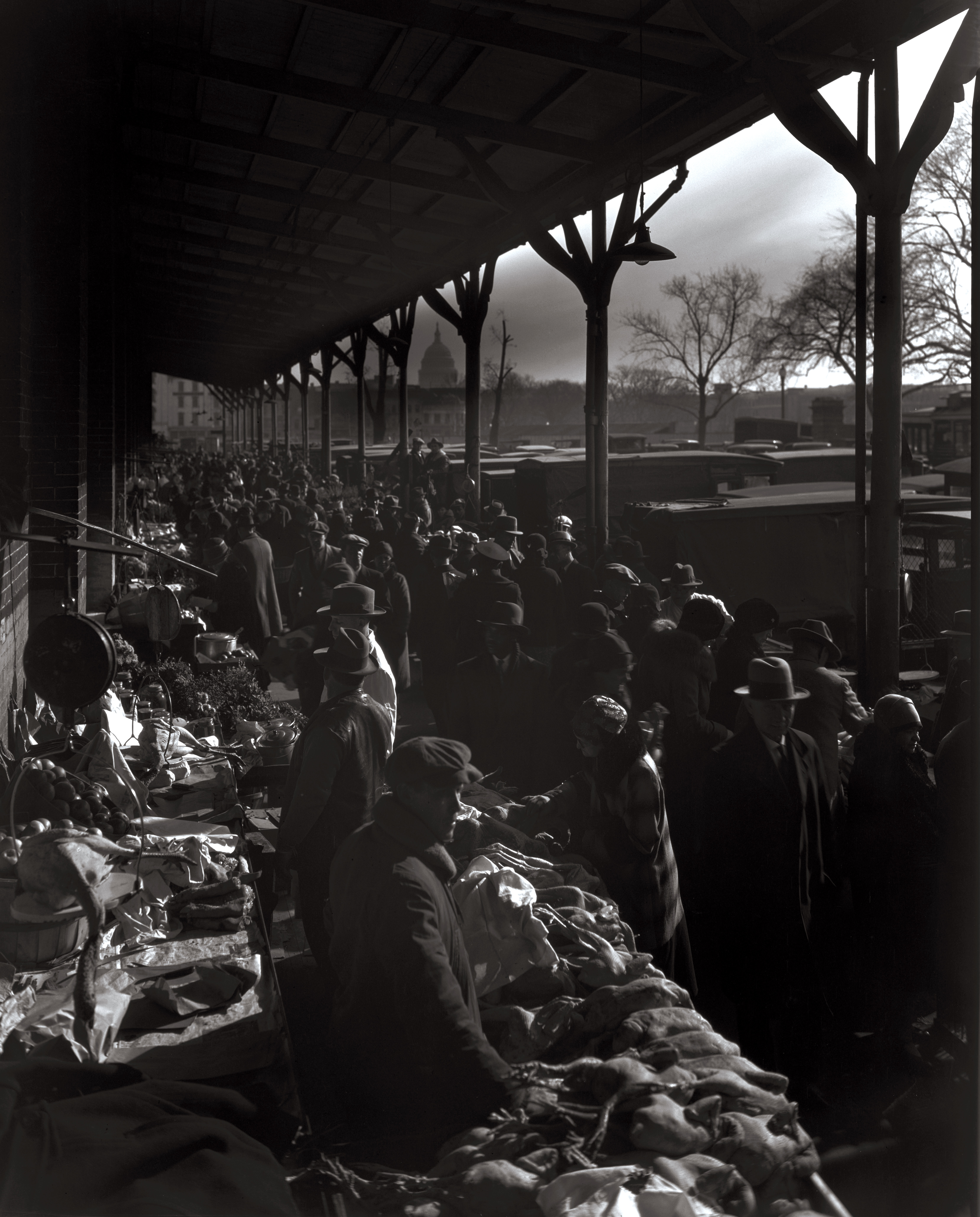
Shoppers on B Street NW (Constitution Avenue) with the Capitol Building in the background

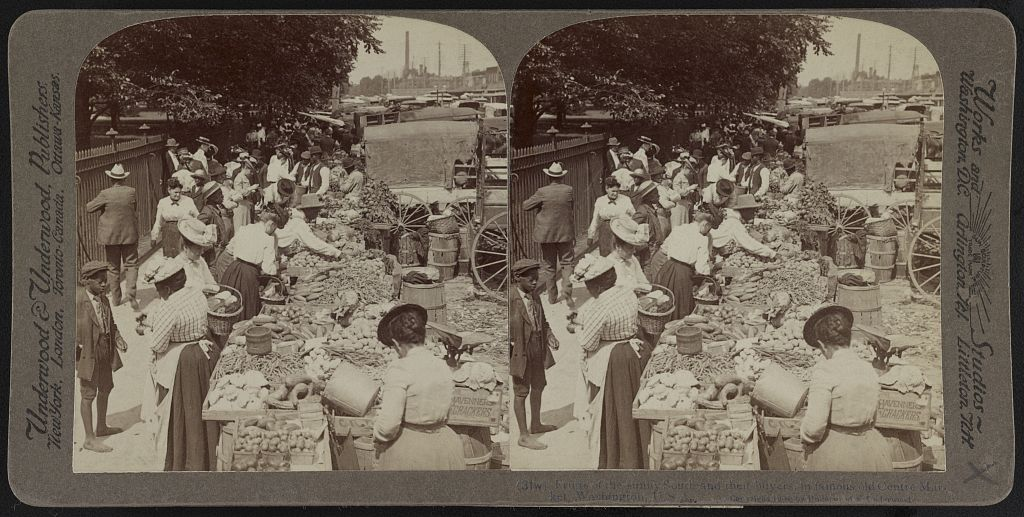
Outside vendors in front of the Center Market

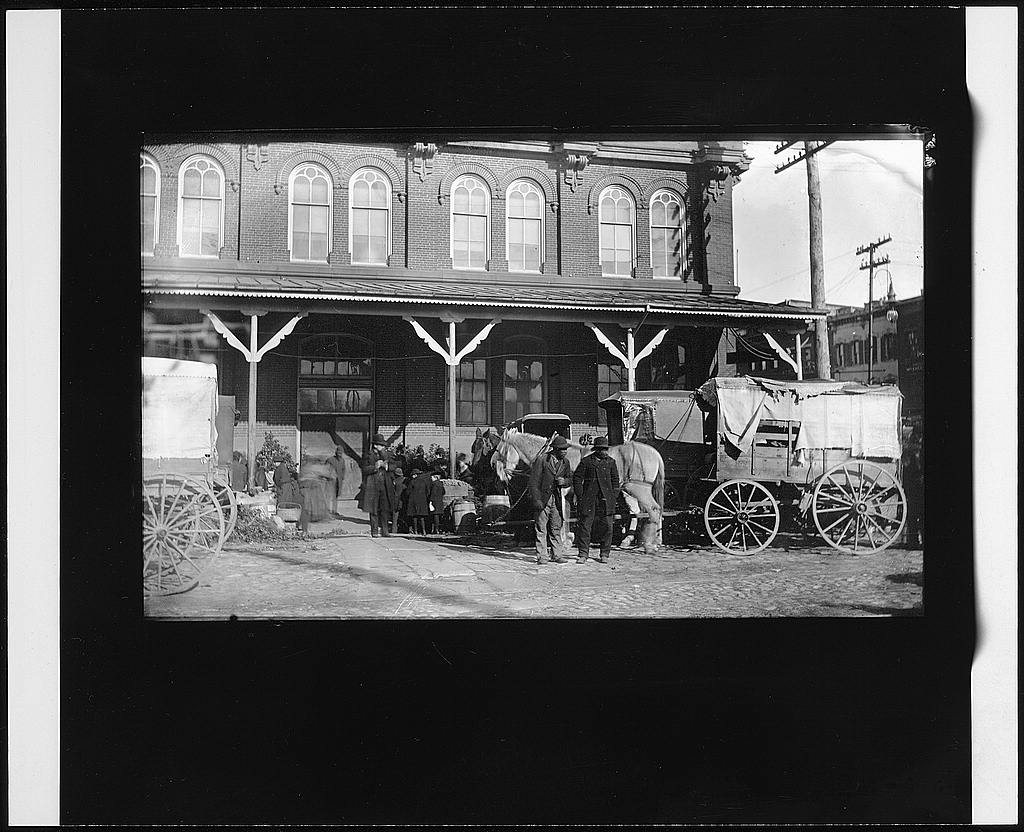
Horse-drawn wagons at the corner of B Street NW and 7th Street NW

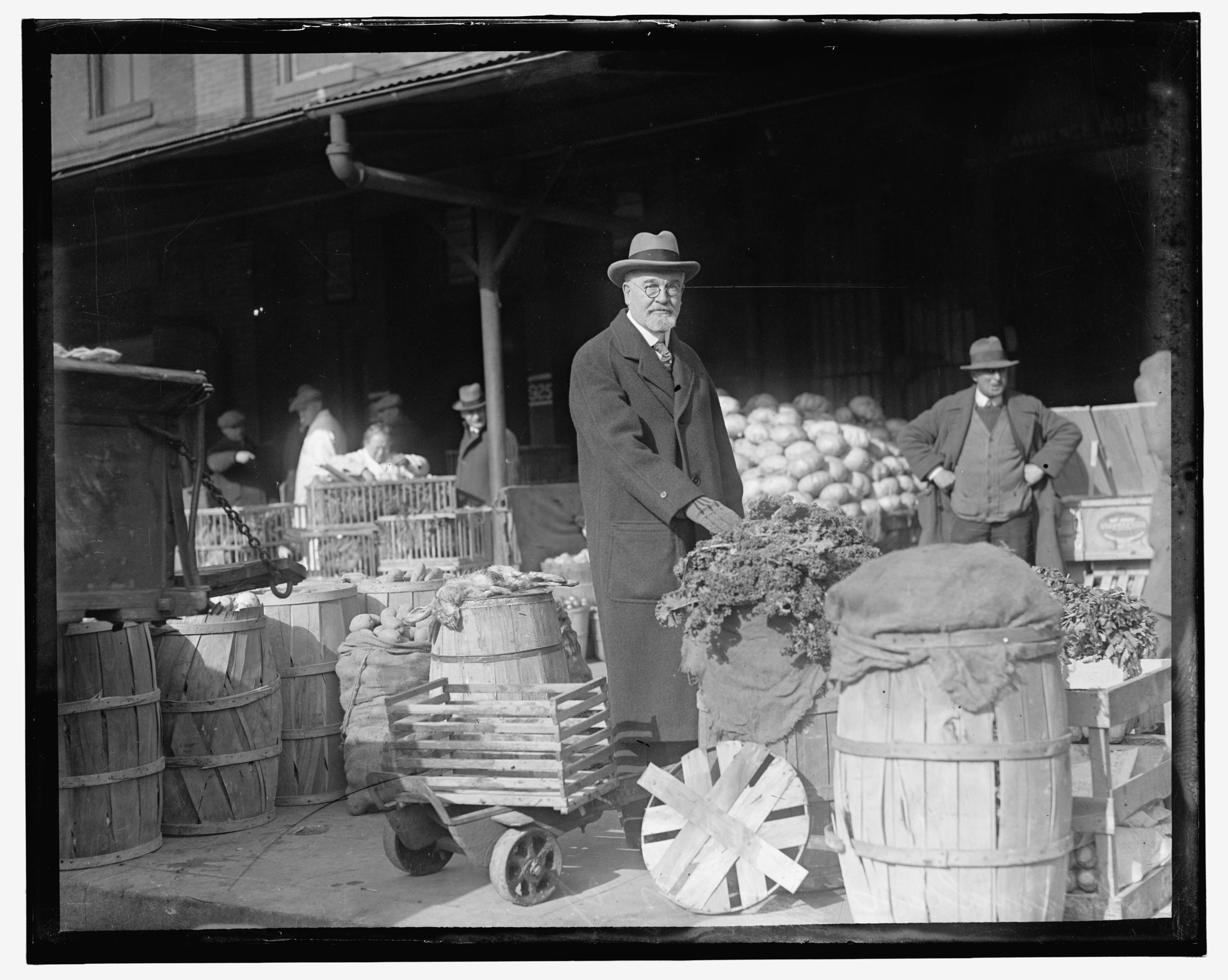
Shopper in the exterior part of Center Market

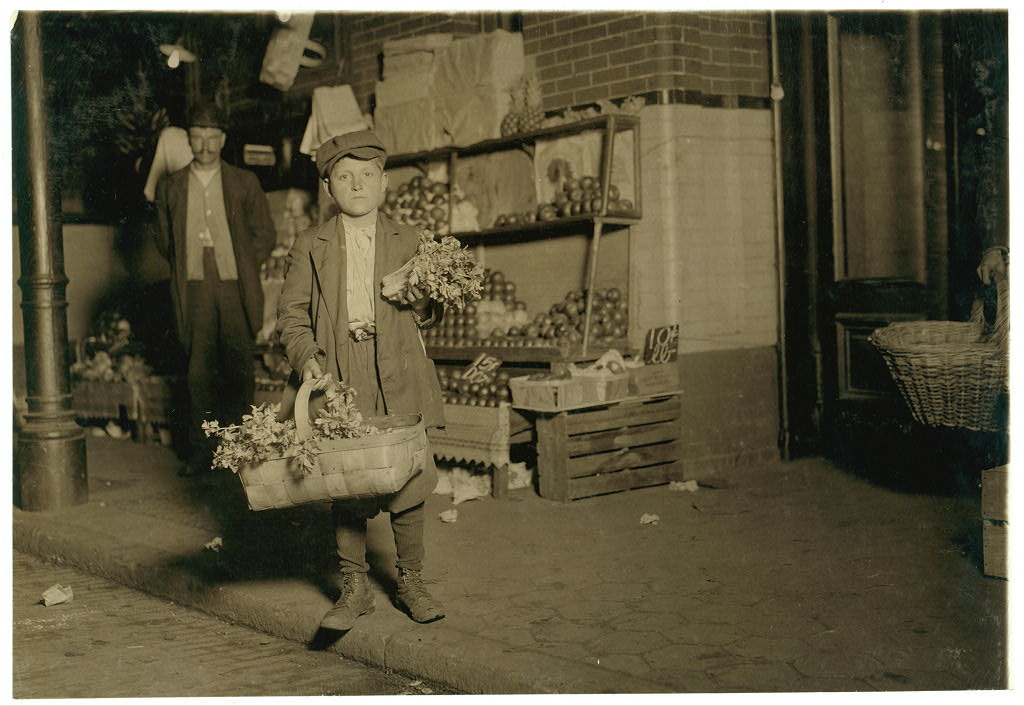
10:30 P.M. At Center Market. 11 yr. old Celery Vendor Gus Strateges, 212 Jackson Hall Alley. He sold until 11 P.M. and was out again Sunday morning selling papers ana gum. Has been in this country only a year and a half. Location: [Washington (D.C.), District of Columbia

=== Demolition ===
The Market was sitting on prime land along what was to become Constitution Avenue. It was incompatible with the McMillan Plan, a comprehensive planning document to redevelop the National Mall by removing the Victorian landscaping and building low Neoclassical museums and taller Federal buildings on the sides.

Center Market closed on January 1, 1931 after over 130 years of activity at the site. Many of the vendors moved to the new Center Market on 5th Street NW and K Street NW. That market was originally known as the Northern Liberty Market and later as Convention Hall Market.

== Location ==
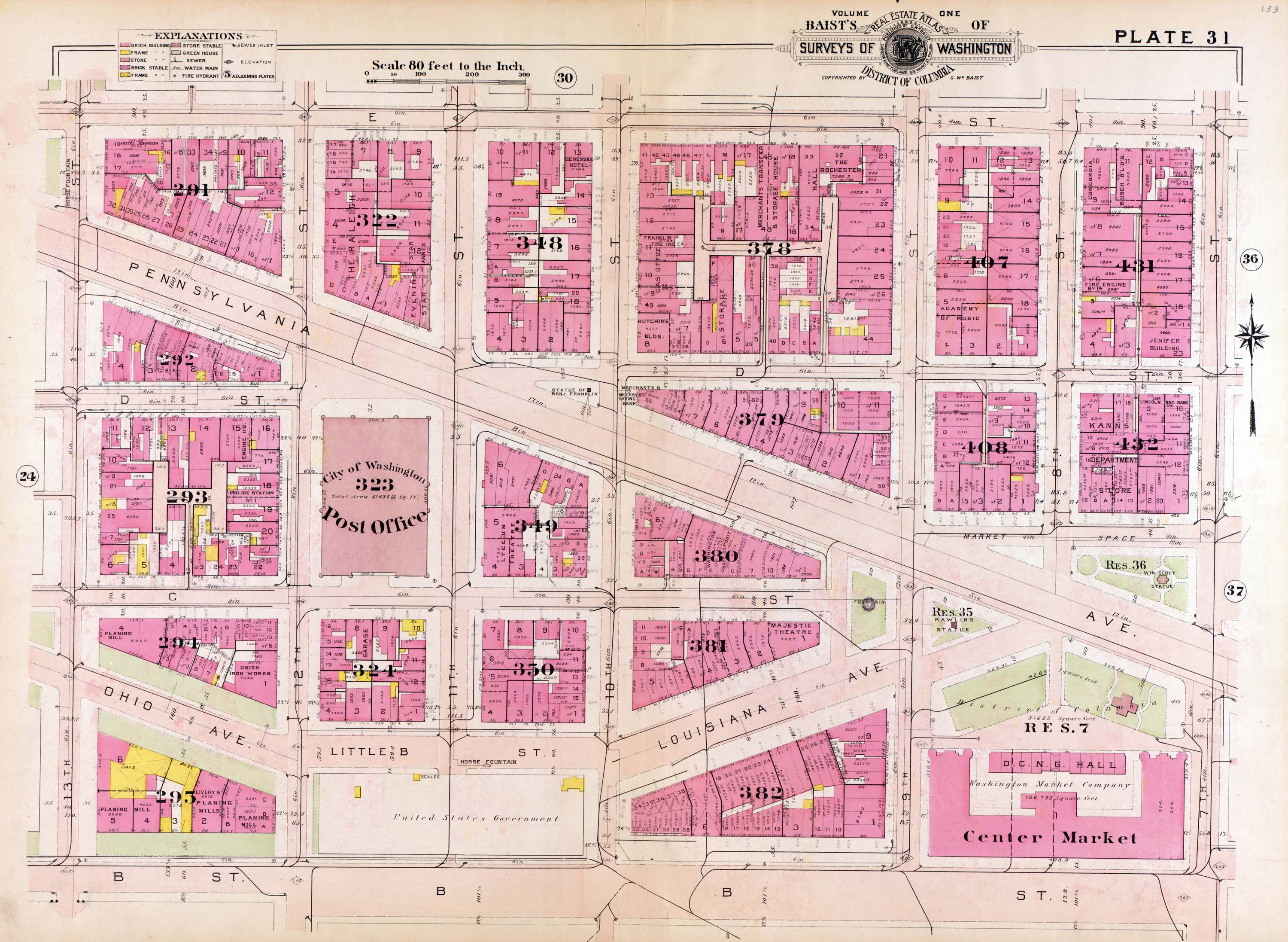
1909 Map of Downtown Washington, DC with Center Market

The Center Market occupied an entire block with Pennsylvania Avenue NW on the northern side and Louisiana Ave NW, 7th Street NW on the east, Constitution Avenue on the south and 9th Street NW on the west.

The Center Market was a hub for public transportation, since several of D.C.'s trolley lines converged there:

- The Washington & Georgetown line
- The Metropolitan line
- The Anacostia & Potomac River line

In addition, street parking was available for the few cars of the time.

Today, the National Archives Building stands in its place. Louisiana Ave NW has been renamed Indiana Ave NW east of 7th Street NE and no longer exists on the west. The US Department of Justice Building stands where the avenue used to be.

== See also ==
- Western Market
- Eastern Market
