= National University School of Law =

Law school in Washington D.C. (1869–1954)

The National University School of Law was an American law school founded in 1869 in Washington, D.C. The school was the principal component of National University, an institution that aimed to become the national university of the United States, though the plan never came to fruition. (Note: Stevens 1983, p. 85, footnote 15. "Although it had medical and dental schools (1884-1903) at different points and a college was attached in the 1920s, National University was basically a law school.") The law school operated until 1954, when it merged with the George Washington University Law School.

== History ==
Advocates for National in the mid-19th century favored the "grand idea" of a flagship American university in the style of prominent European institutions, as promoted by presidents George Washington, James Madison, and John Quincy Adams. These advocates quoted Washington in his eighth State of the Union address: "I have heretofore proposed to the consideration of Congress the expediency of establishing a national university and also a military academy. The desirableness of both these institutions has so constantly increased with every new view I have taken of the subject that I can not omit the opportunity of once for all recalling your attention to them."

Washington had given the U.S. $25,000 from his personal estate for the purpose of establishing such an institution and a "popular subscription fund" of $30,000 was also established in 1795. In the early days of the republic, however, both Congress and Thomas Jefferson opposed the idea. An 1811 Congressional report recommended against a national university, calling it unconstitutional.

In pursuit of Washington's goal, the school's founders in the 1860s cited his statement that "a primary object of such a national institution should be the education of our youth in the science of government" and made the school of law the university's first institution.

=== Operation ===
National University was founded in 1869. An 1870 law passed by Congress (16 Stat. 98) allowed for the creation of corporations (including institutions of higher learning) in the District of Columbia, which allowed for the school's formal incorporation on Sept. 19, 1870. The founder and first dean of the law school was William B. Wedgewood.

The first commencement was held May 21, 1872 for 31 graduates receiving two-year Bachelor of Laws degrees. U.S. President Ulysses S. Grant, chancellor ex officio, conferred the degrees.

In 1873, the school had three professors — Wedgewood and federal judges Joseph Casey and Arthur MacArthur. There were 32 graduates that year, and 275 total students over the first four years of the school's existence. By 1878, the school employed four professors and by the late 1880s, the class size had increased to 70 graduates, with 30 earning advanced Master of Laws degrees.

Other prominent early lecturers included Supreme Court justice Samuel Freeman Miller and historian James Schouler.

=== Alumni ===
One notable graduate of the school was early suffragist Belva Ann Lockwood. After being rejected by the Columbian College, Georgetown University, and Howard University law schools due to her gender, she applied to National. Law school dean Wedgewood, a supporter of women's suffrage, offered to teach private classes for Lockwood and other women, but told them that such instruction would not result in a diploma. After completing the course of study, Lockwood petitioned President Ulysses S. Grant for a diploma, in his role as chancellor ex officio of the school. She was granted her diploma in 1873, and was admitted to the District of Columbia bar association in September of that year. In 1879, Lockwood became the first woman to be allowed to practice before the U.S. Supreme Court. She was one of the first women to run for president, in 1884 and 1888.

Another well respected female jurist, Ellen K. Raedy, was both a graduate and the first female faculty member of the National law school. Raedy earned her law degree in 1928 and began practicing law with her brothers soon after. In 1935, she was appointed judge to the D.C. Municipal Court and was one of the first female judges appointed by President Franklin D. Roosevelt. She began teaching legal ethics classes at National in 1939, and became the first female moot court judge for the school in 1940.

== National University ==
In the early years, presidents Ulysses S. Grant, James A. Garfield, Rutherford B. Hayes, Chester A. Arthur, and Grover Cleveland acted as chancellors ex officio by virtue of their office. After Cleveland, the board of regents abolished the office and elected Supreme Court justice Samuel Freeman Miller as the first chancellor in 1890. He died that year, and prominent jurist Arthur MacArthur Sr. served as the first long-term chancellor. Other chancellors included Richard H. Alvey, Eugene Carusi, Charles Sherrod Hatfield, and Leslie C. Garnett.

Due to the school's growth and other changes, National was reorganized as a university by a special Act of Congress (29 Stat. 194) in 1896. The initial trustees included MacArthur, Alvey, Charles C. Cole, William Benning Webb, Carusi, H. O. Claughton, Thomas Wilson, Matthew G. Emery, John Goode, Charles Lyman, William C. Wittemore, John T. Winter, and Howard H. Barker.

National University operated medical and dental schools from 1884-1903, and a college containing a school of economics and government from the 1920s through the early 1940s. Former Czechoslovak ambassador Charles Pergler acted as dean for the economics and government school from 1933-1936 and was the law school dean from 1936-1946.

== Merger with George Washington University ==
In the 1940s and early 1950s, the National law school saw a steep dropoff in attendance, from a class of 325 in 1941 to 38 graduates in 1950 and 43 in 1954. Initially, National University responded by restructuring, creating the position of President in 1953 and electing Rowland F. Kirks, a special assistant to the Attorney General and former professor of law at the school, to the post.

Kirks intended to expand the university’s graduate programs, including a partnership with the Washington School of Psychiatry, but this plan was short lived. In 1954, less than a year and a half later, Kirks resigned to become legislative counsel to the National Automobile Dealers Association. Within a month, a merger between National University and George Washington University was announced. The merger had been rumored for months, but was delayed by the major stumbling block of segregation. National had desegregated years before while George Washington had remained staunchly opposed to integration. As National had six African American students matriculating at the time, merging the schools would require a change in policy.

George Washington trustees voted to desegregate the university on June 30, 1954. Later the same day, they ratified the merger with National. The new arrangement granted George Washington control of National's physical property, assets, and library collection. Author Andrew Novak, a former editor of the George Washington student newspaper, says it seems likely that the merger acted as the final incentive for GWU, already under pressure from students, faculty, and the American Association of Law Schools, to change their policy on segregation. Orville Hassler Walburn was dean of the National law school at the time of the merger.
