= Sayles Jenks Bowen =

American politician

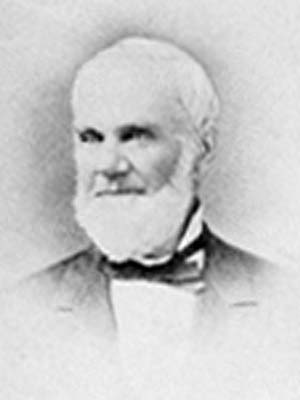

20th Mayor of the City of Washington, D.C.
- In office June 8, 1868 – June 7, 1870
- Preceded by: Richard Wallach
- Succeeded by: Matthew G. Emery

Personal details
- Born: October 7, 1813 Scipio, New York, United States
- Died: December 16, 1896 (aged 83) Washington, D.C., United States
- Resting place: Congressional Cemetery
- Party: Republican Party

Sayles Jenks Bowen (7 October 1813 – 16 December 1896) son of Josiah Bowen and Deborah Jenks, was the twentieth Mayor of Washington City, District of Columbia, from 1868 to 1870 and, as of 2025, the last Republican mayor in the District of Columbia or any of its sub-jurisdictions. Bowen was one of the most controversial mayors in the history of the American capital, because of his outspoken support of emancipation and racial integration.

Bowen was born in Scipio, New York in 1813. He married Mary Barker in 1835 and moved with her to Washington, D.C. to begin business as a merchant. President James K. Polk appointed Bowen to a clerkship in the Treasury Department in 1845, but revoked the appointment three years later when Bowen gained the reputation of a radical for distributing abolitionist propaganda; additionally, he supported Free Soil candidate Martin Van Buren in that year's presidential election rather than Polk's preferred successor, Lewis Cass. For the next six years Bowen prosecuted claims against the U.S. government, then became a founder of, and staunch activist for, the new Republican Party.

Upon his inauguration as president in 1861, Abraham Lincoln appointed Bowen as Police Commissioner for the District of Columbia, beginning the latter's career in city politics. During the same time, he served on the Levy Court of Washington County as a representative of the eastern part of the county. The following year he became Tax Collector for the District, and in 1863 was appointed the D.C. postmaster.

In 1868, Bowen was nominated by the Republicans as a candidate for Mayor of Washington against Democrat John T. Given. At that time, post-Civil War Washington had been ravaged by the war and by a desperate shortage of funds from Congress; the city had deteriorated so badly that there was much talk in the Federal sector of relocating the seat of government to St. Louis. Bowen ran for mayor under the slogan "A vote for Bowen is a vote for keeping the capital in Washington." In that year's July election, blacks voted in Washington for the first time, and because of Bowen's famous support of civil rights, he received narrow support from white voters and overwhelming support from black ones. The margin was extremely narrow in favor of Bowen, but close enough to necessitate a recount by the City Councils; however, while it was still proceeding, the Republicans on the recount committee (including the most powerful Republican politician in the District, Alexander Robey Shepherd) publicly declared Bowen the winner and he took office.

Once elected, however, Bowen's activism startled even the Radical Republican contingent that then dominated Congress. He agitated for complete integration of the city's public school system. When that failed, he turned instead to constructing a network of schools specifically for "persons of color," diverting large sums of city funds and even providing $20,000 of his own.

Bowen's policies of activism on behalf of black civil rights outraged well-to-do white citizens of Washington, but even the Republicans who had enforced black rights and suffrage in the capital concluded that Bowen was far more interested in civil rights for Black people than in governing the city and administering public services. He spent extravagant portions of the city budget in creating schools and employment for Black people, which, while regarded as noble by the Republicans, drained the coffers of money that was intended for maintaining the city. Bowen was even charged with reducing street service to men using penknives to cut the grass between the cobblestones on Pennsylvania Avenue.

By 1870, the city's debt had increased by 33 percent over its total two years before. Bowen was universally blamed, enough so that his furniture was seized in a judgement to try to replenish Washington's funds. Although he sought reelection that year, Republicans united with Democrats to vote overwhelmingly for his opponent, Matthew Gault Emery

After leaving office, Bowen served as president of the Freedmen's Aid Society, and as a member of the board of trustees of colored schools of Washington and Georgetown. He died in 1896 and was interred at Congressional Cemetery.

In 1902, the Sayles J. Bowen school, at 3rd and K SW, was built and named in his honor. It was later closed, merged with Amidon Elementary to create Amidon-Bowen Elementary School. and demolished and in 1961 the Southwest Neighborhood Library was built on the site of the school.

Political offices
Preceded by Richard Wallach	Mayor of Washington, D.C. 1868–1870	Succeeded by Matthew Gault Emery
