= Matthew Gault Emery =

American politician (1818–1901)

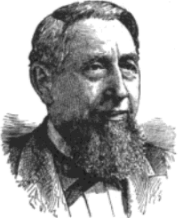

21st Mayor of the City of Washington, D.C.
- In office June 7, 1870 – February 2, 1871
- Preceded by: Sayles Jenks Bowen
- Succeeded by: Office abolished

Personal details
- Born: September 28, 1818; Pembroke, New Hampshire, U.S.
- Died: October 12, 1901 (aged 83); Washington, D.C., U.S.
- Resting place: Rock Creek Cemetery; Washington, D.C., U.S.
- Political party: Republican
- Occupation: Architect; politician

Matthew Gault Emery (September 28, 1818 – October 12, 1901) was the twenty-first Mayor of the City of Washington, D.C. from 1870 to 1871, when the office was abolished. Emery was the last mayor of the city of Washington, D.C.; the current office of Mayor of the District of Columbia has a different geographic jurisdiction.

== Biography ==
Born in Pembroke, New Hampshire, Emery moved to Baltimore, Maryland at the age of 19 (in 1837) and began apprenticing as an architect and builder. Three years later, he moved to Washington in hopes of gaining U.S. government contracts to construct Federal buildings. Over the next decade, Emery would cut and lay stones for, among others, the U.S. Treasury; the Navy Department; the U.S. Patent Office; repair work for the White House; and, most prestigiously, the cornerstone of the Washington Monument, which Emery cut, prepared, and laid in 1848.

Emery served as a Washington Alderman from 1855 to 1857. Joining the newly formed Republican Party, he then acted as a marshal at the 1860 inauguration of Abraham Lincoln.

Elected again as an Alderman in 1869, friends and colleagues encouraged Emery to run the following year against the incumbent mayor Sayles J. Bowen, whose financial negligence had crippled the city with debt and with whom Emery had publicly feuded. Although both Bowen and Emery were Republicans, Bowen had been disowned by the city's chapter of the party, which actually ran Emery on the "Reform" ticket — a ticket that Democrats endorsed rather than risk Bowen's reelection by splitting the vote again with their own candidate. Emery won the election by over 3,000 votes.

Emery's term was extremely short – only 11 months – but during that term, he oversaw the beginning of the largest construction projects ever seen in Washington up to that time. Of particular note within those projects were the paving and grading of 132 streets in the city. He also authorized the construction of a seawall along the Anacostia River and the easternmost section of the Potomac.

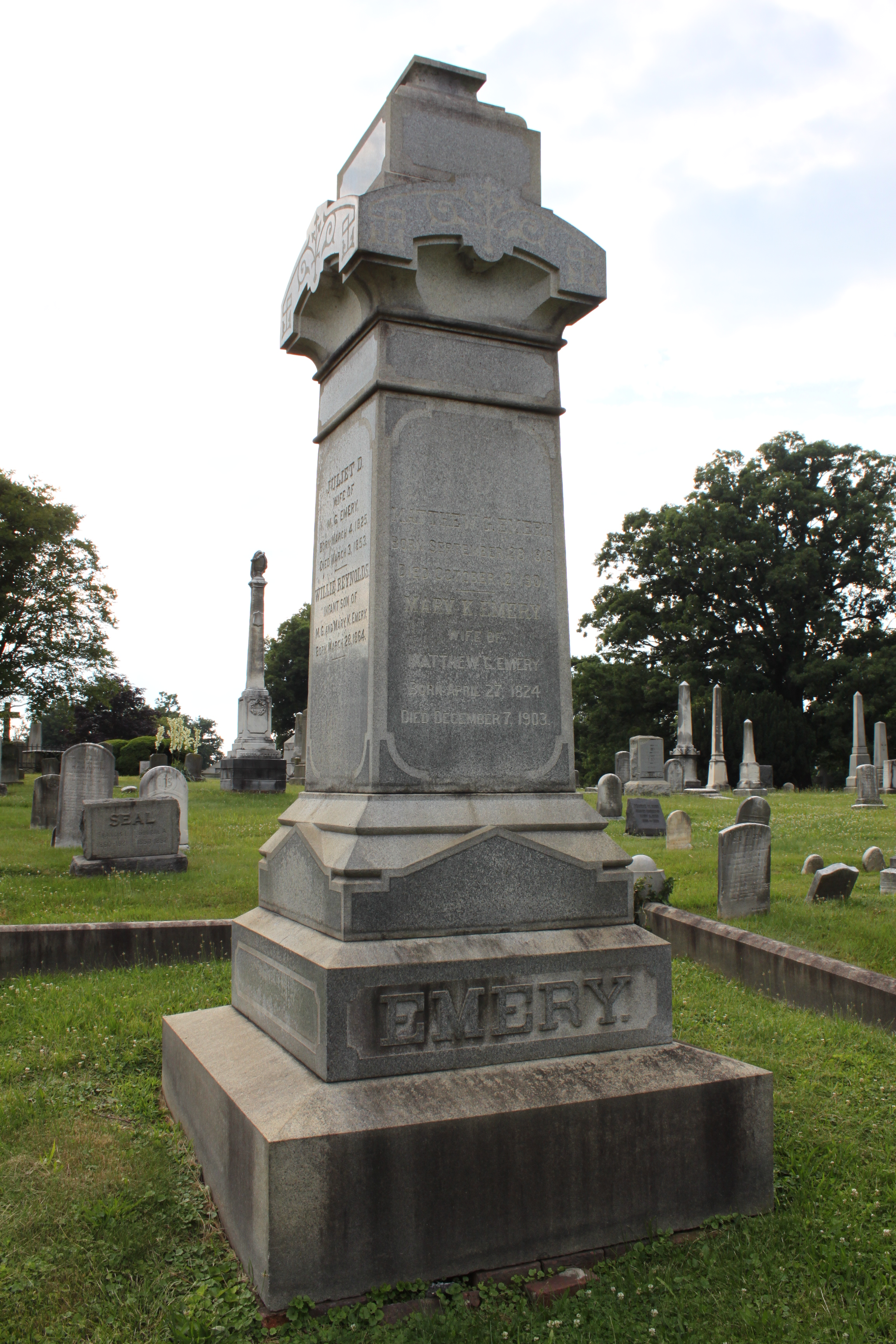
Grave of Emery at Rock Creek Cemetery

After the city government was abolished in favor of the territorial government in June 1871, Emery remained a steadfast advocate for home rule in the District of Columbia, as well as for Congressional representation. He purchased the Washington home of William Tecumseh Sherman when the Civil War hero moved to St. Louis, dying there on October 12, 1901, at the age of 83. He was interred in Washington's Rock Creek Cemetery.

Matthew G. Emery Elementary School, now Emery Education Campus, in Washington, D.C. was named for him.

Political offices
Preceded by Sayles J. Bowen	Mayor of Washington, D.C. 1870–1871	Succeeded by Henry D. Cooke (Governor of the District of Columbia)
