= John Thilman Hendrick =

American politician (1878–1944)

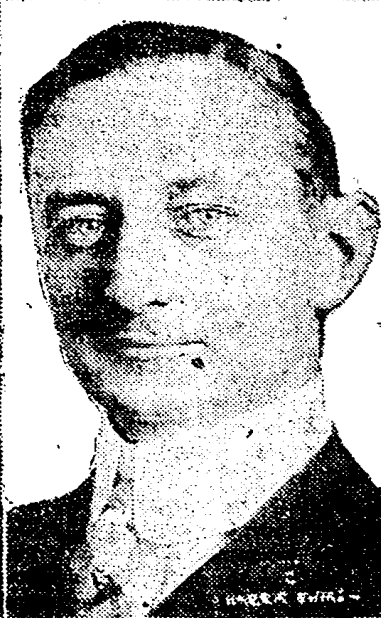
- John Thilman Hendrick in 1920

13th President of the Board of Commissioners of Washington, D.C.
- In office September 25, 1920 – March 4, 1921
- President: Woodrow Wilson
- Preceded by: Louis Brownlow
- Succeeded by: Cuno Hugo Rudolph

Member of the Board of Commissioners of Washington, D.C.
- In office September 17, 1920 – March 4, 1921
- President: Woodrow Wilson
- Preceded by: Louis Brownlow
- Succeeded by: James F. Oyster

Personal details
- Born: November 12, 1878 Clarksville, Tennessee, U.S.
- Died: March 26, 1944 (aged 65) Washington, DC, U.S.
- Resting place: Rock Creek Cemetery; Washington, D.C., U.S.
- Party: Democratic
- Spouse: Elizabeth Graff
- Education: Vanderbilt University; George Washington University
- Profession: Banker, Insurance, Broker, Politician

John Thilman Hendrick (November 12, 1878 – November 12, 1944) was a businessman and the 13th president of the Board of Commissioners of the District of Columbia; he served from late 1920 to March 1921 during the end of the Wilson Administration.

== Early life ==
Hendrick was born in Clarksville, Tennessee, in 1878, the son of David Stewart Hendrick and a distant descendant of Jonathan Edwards, one of the first presidents of Princeton University. He studied at Vanderbilt University before getting his law degree at George Washington University. He moved to Washington, D.C., in 1893.

After graduation, he worked in his father's insurance and banking business. He eventually became general manager of the central eastern division of the Manhattan Life Insurance Company and served as the director of several large banks.

He was one of the founders of the Washington Herald and became involved in the stock market in 1915. He was a member of both the New York and Washington Stock Exchanges.

== Board of commissioners ==
President Woodrow Wilson appointed him to finish he term of Louis Brownlow, who left to become manager of Petersburg, Virginia, on the D.C. Board of Commissioners. Hendrick was elected president of the board, and served for less than six months, the shortest term of any President in the Board's nearly 90-year history.

== Later life ==
After leaving office, he became Chairman of the Board of the Lanston Monotype Company and was a senior partner in the W.B. Hibbs and Company stock brokerage firm. Hendrick died in 1944 in his home on Kalorama Avenue in Washington, D.C. He was buried in Rock Creek Cemetery.

Political offices
Preceded by Louis Brownlow	President of the D.C. Board of Commissioners; 1920-1921	Succeeded by Cuno Hugo Rudolph
