= Neval Thomas =

American civil rights activist

Neval Hollen Thomas (January 6, 1874 – April 13, 1930) was a civil rights activist, high school teacher, and president of the Washington, D.C., local NAACP branch from 1925 to 1930.

== Education and Teaching Career ==
Neval Hollen Thomas was born in 1874 in Springfield, Ohio. He attended public school in Ohio, then pursued a bachelor's degree at Howard University. Receiving his B.A. in 1901, he then enrolled in Howard Law School. Despite attaining his law degree in 1904 with hopes to go after a legal career, Thomas pursued teaching as a career instead.

Thomas taught American history for 19 years at M Street High School in Washington, D.C. At the time, M Street High School (later named Dunbar High School) was one of the most "prestigious and exceptional African American educational institutions to have ever existed in the United States." Students were offered a comprehensive academic education. Thomas was interested in the subjects of race and democracy and often tied his teachings at M Street High School to these subjects. In order to expand his education, he traveled abroad and visited churches and literary social clubs. He worked well with the school boards and accomplished several projects to get a stadium and a greenhouse built for the student and faculty body. Later, he became Dunbar's vice principal.

== Washington Riots ==
The summer of 1919, also known as the Red Summer, brought great attention to Thomas. There was rioting on the streets of Washington between blacks and whites, and blacks armed themselves with guns to fight back. Thomas met with city officials, such as chief executive, Louis Brownlow, to discuss the events of the riots and encouraged something to be done immediately. As the fighting raged on in D.C., he helped obtain lawyers for imprisoned blacks, distributed pamphlets, and roamed the streets to help aid the rioters. Denouncing the city commissioner and chief of police, he claimed, “If you can’t protect us, we will arm and defend ourselves.” Using his position working for the Washington Afro-American newspaper, Thomas reached out to the press. Even though Thomas pushed to end the riots, the congregation of blacks defending their rights on the streets impressed him.

== Role with NAACP (National Association for the Advancement of Colored People) ==
Due to Thomas's leadership during the 1919 riots, as well as his ability to reason with an open ear, he earned a position on the board of directors of the NAACP branch in Washington in 1919. He channeled his activism within the NAACP toward the racial inequalities present in public schools within Washington.

Thomas published an article in 1923 titled "District of Columbia-A Paradise of Paradoxes," where he addressed the racial issues he saw present in the public schools. In his article, he focused on the inequalities of teachers salaries. During his time in the NAACP, he "pushed for equal pay for black school employees” as well as “equal salaries for officers in white and black schools."

His lifelong commitment to the injustices of racial inequality within Washington, D.C., landed him a higher position on the NAACP Washington branch as president of the branch in 1925. Thomas was known as one of the most aggressive branch presidents. He continued to take action against racial inequalities as president. Starting in 1926, Thomas received mixed feedback from NAACP members, especially after he cancelled a speech for the women’s campaign. He wrote numerous hate-filled letters to board members, which were used as evidence for his increasingly radical ideals. Thomas protested in 1927 after "several Negro examiners in the Interior Department were assigned together in a new work station" and forced the Secretaty of the Interior Department to "rescind the segregation."

He used his rhetorical capabilities to convince his audiences. One author deemed him an “egocentric spirit” who “developed a clique that was loyal to him personally, and he disparaged work done by others.”

== Role Outside the NAACP ==
Thomas wrote an essay for The Messenger: a magazine produced by African-Americans that challenged racial segregation. He mentioned the lack of black policeman and firefighters in the city as well as unequal school funding between white and black schools. In 1928, he wrote an article for the Afro-American and said, “the real Republican Party was the greatest political agency in the history of our government, but, IT IS DEAD.” In the article, he denigrated the new era of the Republican Party by claiming they promote class differences between races as well as Ku Klux Klan ideals.

== Death and legacy ==
Neval Thomas died on April 13, 1930, at age 56 due to ongoing health issues. Emma Merritt replaced him as head of the NAACP as the first woman president. After his death, the NAACP adopted less radical ideas; they were more content with the economical, social, and political disparities they faced than they used to be, and lacked his radical push for action. He was known for his active engagement in D.C. for the push for racial equality in public schools and in the workplace and would even “jeopardize his own bread and butter for a high principle." However, by voicing his opinions and maintaining his outspoken, candid manor, he often developed hostility among his adversaries.

In his honor, Washington, D.C., established the Neval Thomas Elementary School on Anacostia Avenue, Washington, D.C.
