= James F. Oyster =

American politician

James Frederick Oyster
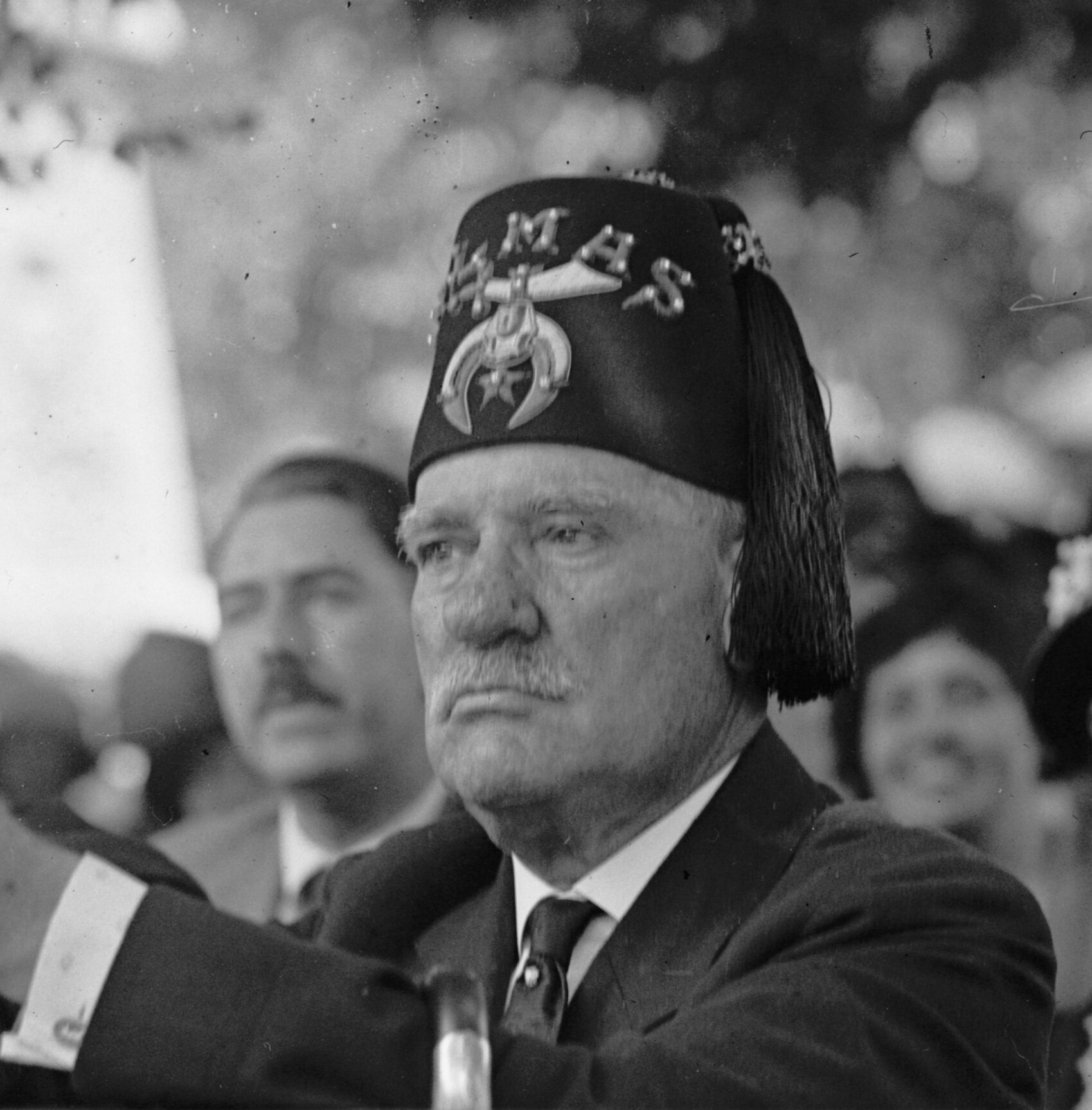
- Oyster in 1923

Member of the District of Columbia Board of Commissioners
- In office March 21, 1921 – May 19, 1925

Personal details
- Born: February 14, 1851 Washington, D.C., U.S.
- Died: May 19, 1925 (aged 74)
- Resting place: Oak Hill Cemetery; Washington, D.C., U.S.
- Children: 2
- Occupation: Politician; merchant

James Frederick Oyster (February 14, 1851 – May 19, 1925) was an American politician and merchant who was a member of the District of Columbia Board of Commissioners, president of the D.C. Board of Education. During his time as a commissioner, Oyster helped enforce Prohibition and gambling laws in the District of Columbia and worked to remedy traffic issues in the city by establishing one-lane streets and block signal traffic lights.

== Early life ==
James Frederick Oyster was born on February 14, 1851, in Washington, D.C. He was educated in public schools and the Rittenhouse Academy.

== Career ==
In 1871, Oyster joined his father and brother in the butter and egg business in Washington, D.C. After his father's retirement in 1886 and his brother's retirement in 1889, Oyster led the business.

Oyster served as vice president and director of the Washington Chamber of Commerce. He then served as president for two years. Oyster was also the president of the Board of Trade. He served as president of the Board of Education from 1906 to 1913.

Oyster was a member of the Washington Light Infantry Corps. He assisted with the organization National Rifles and held the rank of captain until 1895.

In 1914, Oyster was appointed as a member of the Federal Reserve Board for the Fifth District. He served three terms; last elected in 1920. He served on the Rent Commission for the District of Columbia from January 21, 1920, to his resignation on March 21, 1921.

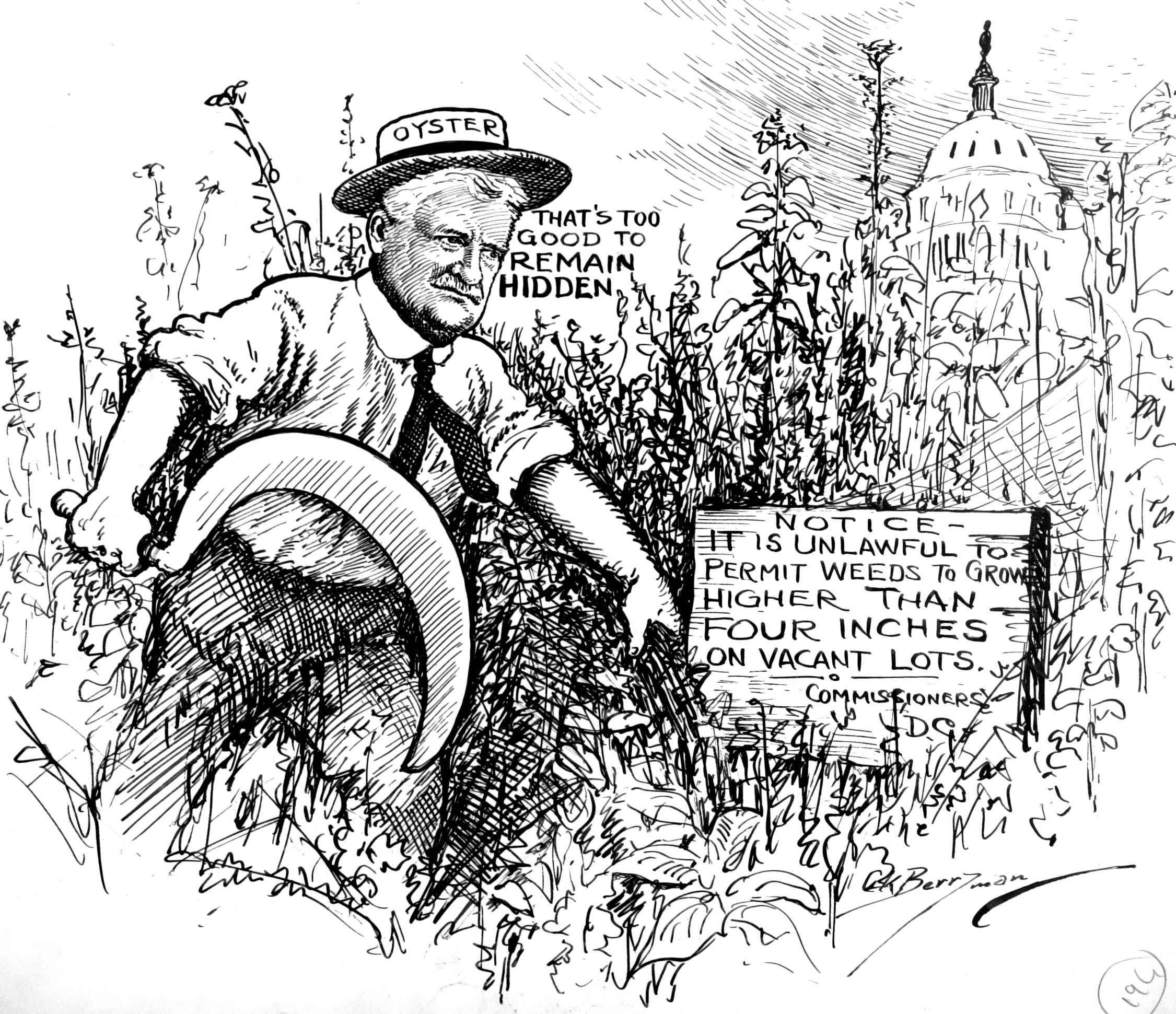
1921 political cartoon by Clifford K. Berryman of Oyster and his "War on Weeds"

On March 21, 1921, Oyster was appointed to the Board of Commissioners for the District of Columbia. He served alongside Commissioner Cuno H. Rudolph. In his role as commissioner, he served as the head of the police, fire, health, playgrounds, and the weights and measures office. He was elected again in 1924 and served as commissioner until his death. In 1921, Oyster argued before the District of Columbia Public Service Commission for the merger of the Washington Railway and Electric Company and the Potomac Electric Power Company.

During his administration, Oyster supported the enforcement of the Prohibition Laws and the prosecution of gamblers. In 1923, Oyster filed complaints that prohibition agents weren't enforcing the Prohibition Laws. Oyster also worked to combat traffic issues in the city. He argued for lower speed limits in Washington, D.C. to help combat traffic issues in the city. He also led the effort to establish one-way streets in the city. In 1924, Oyster tested out block signal traffic lights within the District of Columbia to replace the hand-operated semaphores. Oyster was in favor of the District of Columbia having representation in the United States Congress. In 1921, Oyster was known for his campaign against weeds in Washington, D.C. and his goal to "make Washington a weedless city". He worked with the health and police departments to make it unlawful for weeds to grow longer than four inches.

Oyster operated the business James F. Oyster Inc. and Norman W. Oyster Inc. At the time of his death, the interest in his companies was shared between his son, daughter and Clark G. Diamond.

== Personal life ==
In 1900, Oyster built a summer residence in Bethesda, Maryland called Strathmore Hall. He sold the mansion in 1908 to Charles Corby.

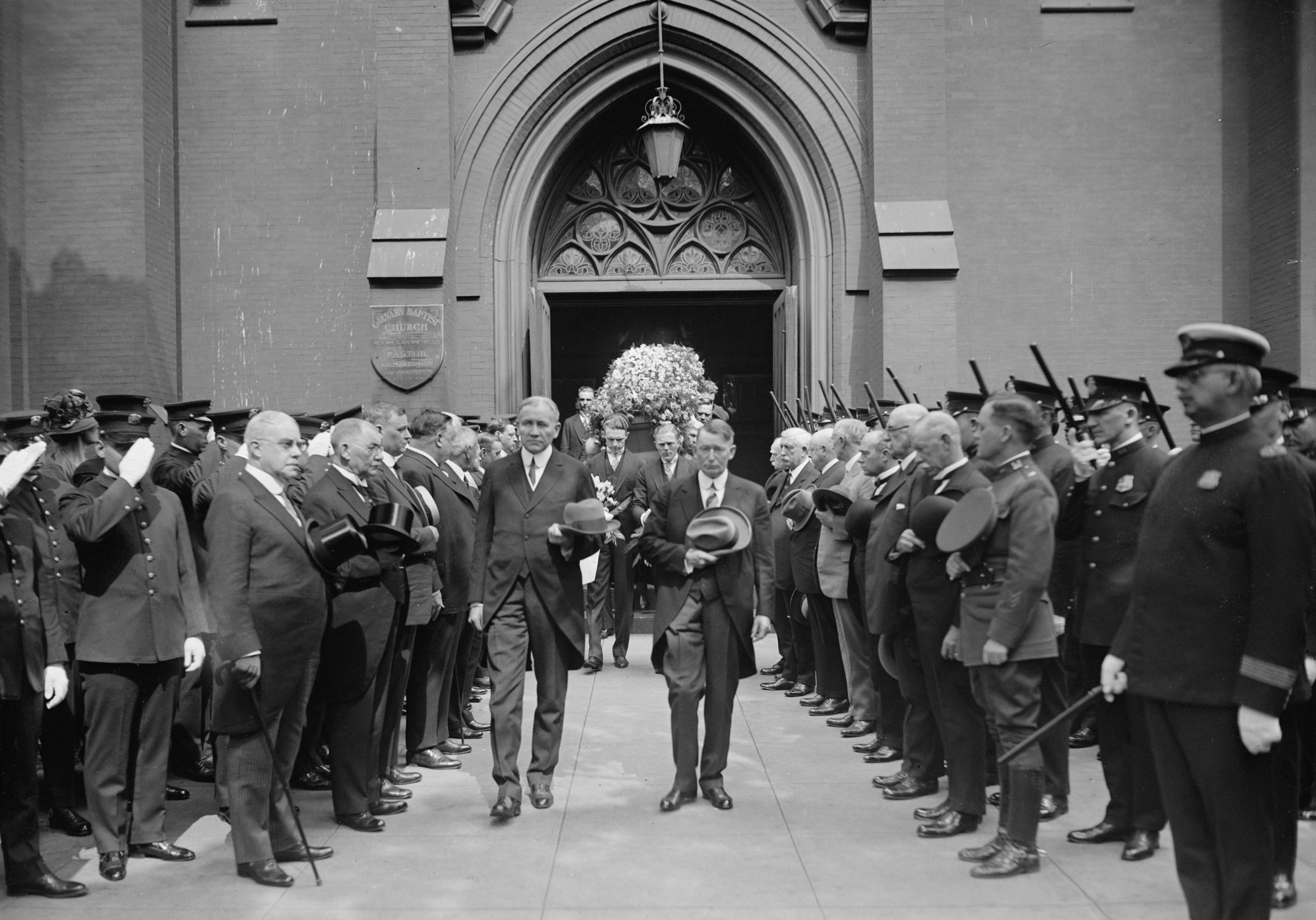
Funeral of Oyster in 1925

Oyster had a son and a daughter: James F. and Helene. Oyster died on May 19, 1925. He was buried at Oak Hill Cemetery in Washington, D.C. His funeral was attended by President Calvin Coolidge.

== Legacy ==
The James F. Oyster School opened in 1926, at 29th and Calvert Street NW in Woodley Park, Washington, D.C. It was named after Oyster. In the 1960s and 1970s, the school became bilingual with the influx of Spanish-speaking immigrants to Washington, D.C. It was later named Oyster-Adams Bilingual School.
