= Melvin Hazen =

American politician (1867–1941)

Melvin C. Hazen
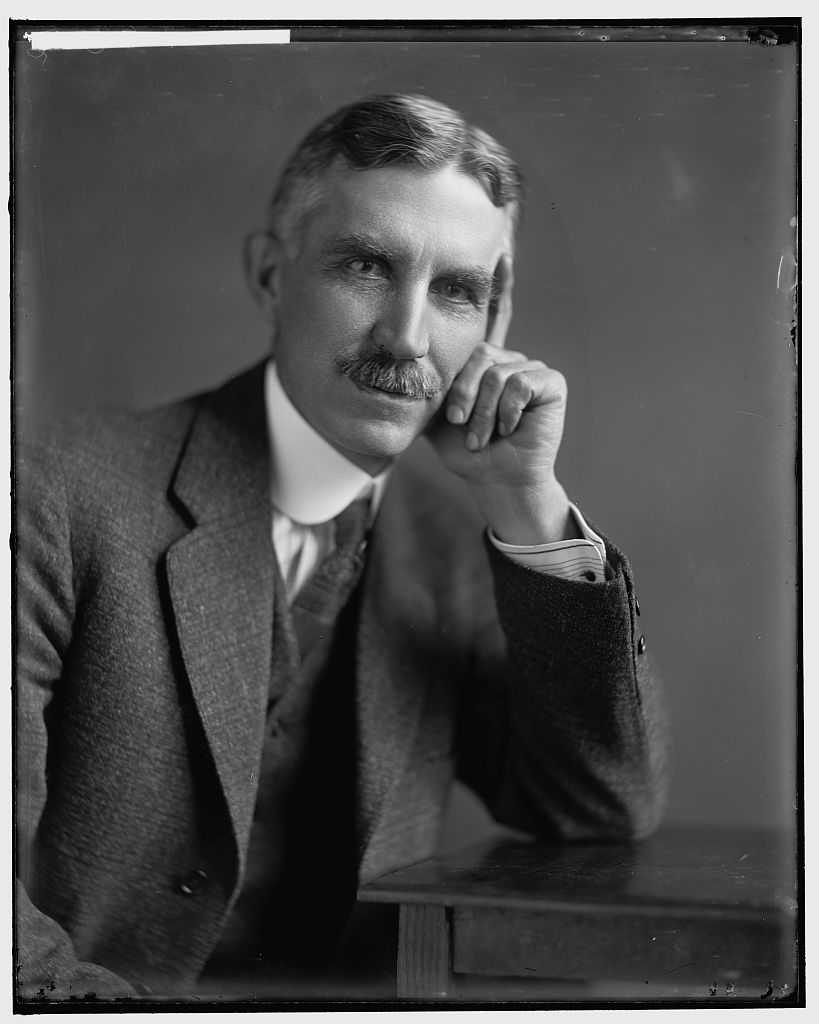
- Melvin Hazen in 1905

17th President of the Board of Commissioners of Washington, D.C.
- In office November 16, 1933 – July 15, 1941
- President: Franklin D. Roosevelt
- Preceded by: Luther Halsey Reichelderfer
- Succeeded by: John Russell Young

Personal details
- Born: October 27, 1867 Catlett, Virginia, U.S.
- Died: July 15, 1941 (aged 73) Washington, D.C., U.S.
- Resting place: Manassas Cemetery, Manassas City, Virginia
- Party: Democratic
- Spouse: Mary Smith (m. 1895)
- Education: University of Maryland
- Profession: Doctor, Politician

Melvin Colvin Hazen (October 27, 1867 – July 15, 1941) was a Washington, DC politician who served as the 17th president of the Board of Commissioners of the District of Columbia, from 1933 to 1941; and the only one to die in office.

== Early life ==
Hazen was born in Catlett, Virginia in 1867 and educated in the county schools there. His father was Charles Wesley Hazen and his mother Mary Elizabeth Colvin. He graduated from the University of Maryland in 1886 with a B.A. degree, and again in 1913 with a degree in civil engineering. In 1889, he joined the surveying corps of the District of Columbia, laying out the street grid beyond the L'Enfant-Ellicott Plan laid out in 1792. Starting at the entry level position of axeman, responsible for clearing brush on survey teams, he rose through the ranks of the D.C. Government. In 1908, the Board of Commissioners of the District of Columbia appointed him Surveyor of the District of Columbia, responsible for all cadastral measurements, street layout, and enforcement of building setbacks.

As the Surveyor was responsible for extensions of the street grid and recording the location of public lands, he served as the principal figure involved in urban planning decades before D.C. had such an office. During this time, he spoke out on matters in the nascent field of planning, and in support of the McMillan Plan. As Surveyor, he was tasked with enforcing a 1914 act that called for the slum clearance of Washington's inhabited alleys. The alleys were streets, often wide, that broke up the often large blocks of Washington's original street plan. The residents of alleys were primarily working-class and African American. Hazen supported the clearances but raised concerns about the process.

He was married to Mary Smith in 1895 and she preceded him in death in 1939.

== Board of Commissioners ==
In 1933, with the support of his friend Cary T. Grayson, he was appointed to the Board of Commissioners of the District of Columbia by President Franklin Delano Roosevelt. He was reappointed two more times but did not finish his third term. On July 15, 1941, during a meeting with colleagues, he had a heart attack and fell onto his desk and then the floor where he was declared dead a few minutes later. One of his last official act was laying the cornerstone for the DC Armory building on East Capitol Street the day before. His death came less than three weeks after he submitted a letter of resignation due to poor health, but the White House had not taken action on a replacement yet. After his death, Roosevelt gave him the name of "Grand Old Man of the District." He was buried next to his wife in the family plot in Manassas Cemetery in Manassas, Virginia.

Constance McLaughlin Green, in her history of the District of Columbia, Washington: Capital City, 1879–1950, considered him emblematic of the pleasant but business-friendly and ineffectual caretakers who oversaw DC during its unelected government.

== Park and Controversy ==
Melvin C. Hazen Park, a wooded valley around a tributary of Rock Creek between Cleveland Park and Van Ness was named in his honor.

During his time as Surveyor, he advocated for the clearance of the largely African American community of Reno for a park and schools. He first advocated for the demolition in a report in 1914 and returned to the topic in the early 1920s. Hazen prepared a plan for the park in 1924. In 1926, he testified in support of the clearance before the Senate Committee on the District of Columbia, when a bill to fund the plan was proposed. This plan was eventually enacted by others between 1926 and the 1950s, creating Fort Reno Park and Alice Deal Middle School.

In November 2020, the neighborhood council that represents Melvin C. Hazen Park requested that the National Park Service, the federal agency that manages the park, change its name, citing his importance in the clearance of Reno, and the following February, D.C. Congressional delegate Eleanor Holmes Norton echoed that call. In February 2022, the NPS announced that it would remove his name.

== Notes ==
Political offices
Preceded by Luther Halsey Reichelderfer	President of the D.C. Board of Commissioners; 1933-1941	Succeeded by John Russell Young
