= List of mayors of Washington, D.C. =

Below is a list of mayors of Washington, D.C., and associated political entities.

== History of offices ==
The federal district of the United States was first designated by the amended Residence Act of 1790. That Act designated that the President could appoint three commissioners to locate, define and survey an area not exceeding ten miles square as the capital district, following the Constitutional mandate to do so. From 1791 to 1802 the District was managed by that three-member Board of Commissioners of the Federal City as listed below.

With the passage of the District of Columbia Organic Act of 1801, the District was brought under the direct political control of Congress. The Board of Commissioners was dissolved. That Act made no provision for an executive for the District as a whole. The District consisted of five political subdivisions: three cities with their own municipal governments, and two rural counties. The pre-existing city of Georgetown and its mayors are listed below. The pre-existing city of Alexandria, Virginia, had its own list of mayors before, during and after its inclusion in the District. And the new City of Washington was chartered shortly after the District, in 1802. Its mayors also appear below. The rural county west of the Potomac, formerly Virginia, was Alexandria County. Finally to the east and outside the cities, formerly Maryland, lay Washington County, D.C. (Both counties were governed by levy courts made of providentially appointed Justices of the Peace, whose members do not appear below. Prior to 1802, those Justices of the Peace were appointed by the governors of Maryland and Virginia, after which they were appointed by the President until they were abolished in 1871).

In 1846, Alexandria County and the City of Alexandria returned to Virginia, leaving the District with two independent cities and one county.

In 1871, with the District of Columbia Organic Act, those three subdivisions within the District were unified into a single government, whose chief executive was a territorial Governor. As listed below, only two served before this office was abolished in 1874, and replaced with a temporary three-member Board of Commissioners appointed by the President. The board was made permanent in 1878 and this system continued until 1967, when it was replaced by a single mayor-commissioner and city council appointed by the President. Finally, in 1974, the District of Columbia Home Rule Act allowed for District residents to elect their own mayor.

Currently, the Mayor of the District of Columbia is popularly elected to a four-year term with no term limits. Even though District of Columbia is not a state, the district government also has certain state-level responsibilities, making some of the mayor's duties analogous to those of United States governors. The current mayor of the District of Columbia is Muriel Bowser, a Democrat, who has served in the role since January 2, 2015.

The lists on this page include all of the chief executives of the District of Columbia in their various forms.

=== Commissioners of the Federal City (1791–1802) ===
The 1790 Act for establishing the temporary and permanent seat of the Government of the United States, Act of March 3, 1791, 1 Stat. 214, set up a board of three commissioners to survey and define the territory of the Federal City, and to purchase land for development and oversee the construction of all federal buildings. Some reports name Thomas Johnson as the chair of the Board of Commissioners, but it appears there was no chair, even if Johnson acted in the manner of a chair. The commission had very little to do with the municipal regulation of the District and when their board was dissolved their powers were transferred to the "Superintendent", "Commissioner to Superintend Public Buildings" and the "Chief Engineer of the United States Army." The local public affairs were instead governed by a Levy Court made up of Justices of the Peace who, until passage of the Organic Act of 1801 were commissioned by the governors of Virginia (for Arlington County) and Maryland (for Prince George's and Montgomery County – the north part of the District remained part of these counties until 1801), and in the Federal city their powers were transferred to the Mayor and local government. During this time William Thornton, Robert Bowie, Daniel Carroll, and Robert Brent were some of the men who served on the Levy Court of Prince George's County.

Name	Start	End	State	Party
David Stuart	January 22, 1791	September 12, 1794	Virginia	Independent
Thomas Johnson	January 22, 1791	August 23, 1794	Maryland	Federalist
Daniel Carroll	March 4, 1791	May 21, 1795	Maryland	Independent
Gustavus Scott	August 23, 1794	December 25, 1800	Maryland	Independent
William Thornton	September 12, 1794	July 1, 1802	Pennsylvania	Independent
Alexander White	May 21, 1795	July 1, 1802	Virginia	Pro-Administration
William Cranch	January 14, 1801	March 3, 1801	Massachusetts	Federalist
Tristram Dalton	March 10, 1801	July 1, 1802	Massachusetts	Pro-Administration

=== Mayors of the City of Washington (1802–1871) ===
The persons listed below are the mayors of the now-defunct City of Washington, which was officially granted a formal government in 1802. The Mayor of Washington had authority over city services, appointments, and local tax assessments; however, the duties of the mayor mostly consisted of requesting appropriations from Congress to finance the city. From 1802 to 1812, the mayor was appointed by the President of the United States. Between 1812 and 1820, the city's mayors were then selected by a city council. From 1820 to 1871 the mayor was popularly elected. The present-day boundaries of the "Old City" were Rock Creek to the west, Florida Avenue to the north, and the Anacostia River to the east and south.

Starting in March 1801 the County of Washington, which included the city (or corporation) of Washington and the city of Georgetown, was governed by a Levy Court, of unfixed number, made up of Justices of the Peace chosen by the President. It was one of these Justice of the Peace appointments, made in the 24 hours between the passage of the Organic Act of 1801 and the end of John Adams' term that became the subject of Marbury v. Madison. In 1804, the Levy Court lost the power to tax the residents of Washington City, but in 1808 the city was required to contribute to the revenue of the county and in 1826 the Levy Court lost the power to tax those in Georgetown. An 1812 law fixed the number of judges to seven, two from east of Rock Creek but outside of Washington City, two from west of Rock Creek but outside of Georgetown and three from Georgetown, with none from Washington City until an 1848 law added four members from the city. Even when the City of Washington was not represented on the Levy Court, they were still required to contribute to the costs of the county, except for bridges and roads outside its boundaries. The court was again changed in 1863 when it was reduced to nine members, three from the city of Washington, one from Georgetown, and five from county lands outside the city. The Levy Court was disbanded in 1871 with the Mayor when congress consolidated all the remaining governments in DC. Some of the more prominent members of the Levy Court include Thomas Corcoran, John Cox, George W. Riggs, and Sayles J. Bown

Name	Start	End	Party
Robert Brent	June 1, 1802	June 8, 1812	Democratic-Republican Party
Daniel Rapine	June 8, 1812	June 14, 1813	Independent
James H. Blake	June 14, 1813	June 9, 1817	Independent
Benjamin G. Orr	June 9, 1817	June 14, 1819	Independent
Samuel Smallwood	June 14, 1819	June 14, 1822	Independent
Thomas Carbery	June 14, 1822	June 14, 1824	Independent
Samuel Smallwood	June 14, 1824	September 30, 1824	Independent
Roger C. Weightman	October 4, 1824	June 11, 1827	Independent
Joseph Gales	June 11, 1827	June 14, 1830	Independent
John Peter Van Ness	June 14, 1830	June 9, 1834	Democratic-Republican
William A. Bradley	June 9, 1834	June 13, 1836	Independent
Peter Force	June 13, 1836	June 8, 1840	Whig Party
William Winston Seaton	June 8, 1840	June 10, 1850	Whig Party
Walter Lenox	June 10, 1850	June 14, 1852	Independent
John Maury	June 14, 1852	June 12, 1854	Democratic
John T. Towers	June 12, 1854	June 9, 1856	Know Nothing
William B. Magruder	June 9, 1856	June 14, 1858	Anti-Know-Nothing-Party
James G. Berret	June 14, 1858	August 26, 1861	Anti-Know-Nothing-Party, Democratic
Richard Wallach	August 26, 1861	June 8, 1868	Republican
Sayles Bowen	June 8, 1868	June 7, 1870	Republican
Matthew Emery	June 7, 1870	February 28, 1871	Republican

=== Mayors of Georgetown (1790–1871) ===
From 1751 to 1789, Georgetown was governed by Commissioners who were either appointed by an act of Maryland or were elected by the other commissioners to fill vacancies. in 1790 the government was changed to include a Mayor, a Recorder, Aldermen and a Common Council. During this time it was governed by nineteen different commissioners.

Georgetown was a town in Maryland until 1801, when it became a municipality within the District of Columbia. From 1802 until 1871, mayors of Georgetown were elected to one-year terms, with no term limits. Like the City of Washington and Washington County, Georgetown's local government ceased to exist in 1871, when Congress merged the three entities into the single District government.

#	Name	Start	End
1	Robert Peter	1790	1791
2	Thomas Beale	1791	1792
3	Uriah Forrest	1792	1793
4	John Threlkeld	1793	1794
5	Pedro Casenave	1794	1795
6	Thomas Turner	1795	1796
7	Daniel Reintzel	1796	1797
8	Lloyd Beall	1797	1799
9	Daniel Reintzel	1799	1804
10	Thomas Corcoran	1805	1806
11	Daniel Reintzel	1806	1807
12	Thomas Corcoran	1808	1810
13	David Wiley	1811	1812
14	Thomas Corcoran	1812	1813
15	John Peter	1813	1818
16	Henry Foxall	1819	1820
17	John Peter	1821	1822
18	John Cox	1823	1845
19	Henry Addison	1845	1857
20	Richard R. Crawford	1857	1861
21	Henry Addison	1861	1867
22	Charles D. Welch	1867	1869
23	Henry M. Sweeney	1869	1871

=== Governors of the District of Columbia (1871–1874) ===
In 1871, Congress created a territorial government for the entire District of Columbia, which was headed by a governor appointed by the President of the United States to a four-year term. Due to alleged mismanagement and corruption, including allegations of contractors bribing members of the District legislature to receive contracts, the territorial government was discontinued in 1874.

#	Name	Start	End	Party
1	Henry D. Cooke	February 28, 1871	September 13, 1873	Republican
2	Alexander Shepherd	September 13, 1873	June 20, 1874	Republican

=== Commissioners of the District of Columbia (1874–1878) ===
From 1874 to 1878 the District was administered by a three-member, temporary Board of Commissioners with both legislative and executive authority, all appointed by the President. They were assisted by an engineer (Captain Richard L. Hoxie). The law made no provision for a President to this board of temporary Commissioners, and none was ever elected, but Commissioner Dennison acted in that capacity at all board meetings he attended.

Name	Start	End	Party
William Dennison	July 1, 1874	July 1, 1878	Republican
Henry T. Blow	July 1, 1874	December 31, 1874	Republican
John H. Ketcham	July 3, 1874	June 30, 1877	Republican
Seth Phelps	January 18, 1875	June 30, 1878	Republican
Thomas Bryan	December 3, 1877	July 1, 1878	Republican

=== Presidents of the Board of Commissioners (1878–1967) ===
In 1878, the Board of Commissioners was made permanent and re-organized. From 1878 to 1967, the District was administered by this new three-member Board of Commissioners with both legislative and executive authority, all appointed by the President. The board comprised one Democrat, one Republican, and one civil engineer with no specified party. The three Commissioners would then elect one of their number to serve as president of the board. While not quite analogous to the role of a mayor, the president of the board was the district's Chief Executive.

Denotes an Acting President

#	Name	Start	End	Party
1	Seth Phelps	July 1, 1878	November 29, 1879	Republican
2	Josiah Dent	November 29, 1879	July 17, 1882	Democratic
3	Joseph West	July 17, 1882	March 29, 1883	Republican
4	James Edmonds	March 29, 1883	January 1, 1886	Democratic
5	William Webb	January 1, 1886	May 21, 1889	Republican
6	John Douglass	May 21, 1889	March 1, 1893	Republican
7	John Ross	March 1, 1893	June 1, 1898	Democratic
8	John Wight	June 1, 1898	May 9, 1900	Republican
9	Henry MacFarland	May 9, 1900	January 24, 1910	Republican
10	Cuno Rudolph	January 24, 1910	February 28, 1913	Republican
11	Oliver Newman	February 28, 1913	October 9, 1917	Democratic
12	Louis Brownlow	October 9, 1917	September 17, 1920	Democratic
	Charles Kutz	September 17, 1920	September 25, 1920	Independent
13	John Hendrick	September 25, 1920	March 4, 1921	Democratic
14	Cuno Rudolph	March 15, 1921	December 4, 1926	Republican
15	Proctor Dougherty	December 4, 1926	April 10, 1930	Republican
16	Luther Reichelderfer	April 10, 1930	November 16, 1933	Republican
17	Melvin Hazen	November 16, 1933	July 15, 1941	Democratic
18	John Young	July 15, 1941	July 29, 1941	Republican
18	John Young	July 29, 1941	June 2, 1952	Republican
19	F. Joseph Donohue	June 2, 1952	April 6, 1953	Democratic
20	Samuel Spencer	April 6, 1953	April 6, 1956	Republican
21	Robert McLaughlin	April 6, 1956	July 27, 1961	Republican
22	Walter Tobriner	July 27, 1961	November 7, 1967	Democratic

=== Mayor-Commissioner (1967–1975) ===
In 1967, President Lyndon Johnson presented to Congress a plan to reorganize the District's government. The three-commissioner system was replaced by a government headed by a single mayor-commissioner, an assistant mayor-commissioner, and a nine-member district council, all appointed by the president. The mayor-commissioner and his assistant served four-year terms, while the councilmembers served three-year terms. While the council was officially nonpartisan, no more than six of Councilmembers could be of the same political party. Councilmembers were expected to work part-time. All councilmembers and either the mayor-commissioner or his assistant was required to have been a resident of the District of Columbia for the three years preceding appointment. All must be District residents while serving their terms in office.

Council members had the quasi-legislative powers of the former Board of Commissioners, approving the budget and setting real estate tax rates. The mayor-commissioner could, without any Congressional approval, consolidate District agencies and transfer money between agencies, powers that the preceding Board of Commissioners had not possessed since 1952. The mayor-commissioner could veto the actions of the council, but the council could override the veto with a three-fourths vote.

Despite a push by many Republicans and conservative Democrats in the House of Representatives to reject Johnson's plan, the House of Representatives accepted the new form of government for the District by a vote of 244 to 160. Johnson said that the new District government would be more effective and efficient.

Walter E. Washington was appointed the first mayor-commissioner, and Thomas W. Fletcher was appointed the first assistant mayor-commissioner. The first Council appointments were Chair John W. Hechinger, Vice Chair Walter E. Fauntroy, Stanley J. Anderson, Margaret A. Haywood, John A. Nevius, William S. Thompson, J.C. Turner, Polly Shackleton, and Joseph P. Yeldell.

Name	Start	End	Party
Walter Washington	November 7, 1967	January 2, 1975	Democratic

=== Mayors of the District of Columbia (1975–present) ===
Since 1975, the District has been administered by a popularly elected mayor and district council.

Parties

Democratic (7)

#	Name	Start	End	Party	Election(s)	Prior Office
1	Walter Washington (1915–2003)	January 2, 1975	January 2, 1979	Democratic	1974	Mayor-Commissioner of the District of Columbia (1967–1975)
2	Marion Barry (1936–2014)	January 2, 1979	January 2, 1991	Democratic	1978	Member of the Council of the District of Columbia from the at-large district (1975–1979)
2	Marion Barry (1936–2014)	January 2, 1979	January 2, 1991	Democratic	1982	Member of the Council of the District of Columbia from the at-large district (1975–1979)
2	Marion Barry (1936–2014)	January 2, 1979	January 2, 1991	Democratic	1986	Member of the Council of the District of Columbia from the at-large district (1975–1979)
3	Sharon Pratt (born 1944)	January 2, 1991	January 2, 1995	Democratic	1990	Treasurer of the Democratic National Committee (1985–1989)
4	Marion Barry (1936–2014)	January 2, 1995	January 2, 1999	Democratic	1994	Member of the Council of the District of Columbia from Ward 8 (1993–1995)
5	Anthony A. Williams (born 1951)	January 2, 1999	January 2, 2007	Democratic	1998	D.C. Chief Financial Officer (1995–1998)
5	Anthony A. Williams (born 1951)	January 2, 1999	January 2, 2007	Democratic	2002	D.C. Chief Financial Officer (1995–1998)
6	Adrian Fenty (born 1970)	January 2, 2007	January 2, 2011	Democratic	2006	Member of the Council of the District of Columbia from Ward 4 (2001–2007)
7	Vincent C. Gray (born 1942)	January 2, 2011	January 2, 2015	Democratic	2010	Chair of the Council of the District of Columbia (2007–2011)
8	Muriel Bowser (born 1972)	January 2, 2015	January 2, 2027	Democratic	2014	Member of the Council of the District of Columbia from Ward 4 (2007–2015)
8	Muriel Bowser (born 1972)	January 2, 2015	January 2, 2027	Democratic	2018	Member of the Council of the District of Columbia from Ward 4 (2007–2015)
8	Muriel Bowser (born 1972)	January 2, 2015	January 2, 2027	Democratic	2022	Member of the Council of the District of Columbia from Ward 4 (2007–2015)
9	Janeese Lewis George (born 1988)	Mayor-elect takes office January 2, 2027		Democratic	2026	Member of the Council of the District of Columbia from Ward 4 (2021–2027)

== See also ==
- Timeline of Washington, D.C.
