= David Wiley (mayor) =

Mayor of Georgetown, District of Columbia, United States

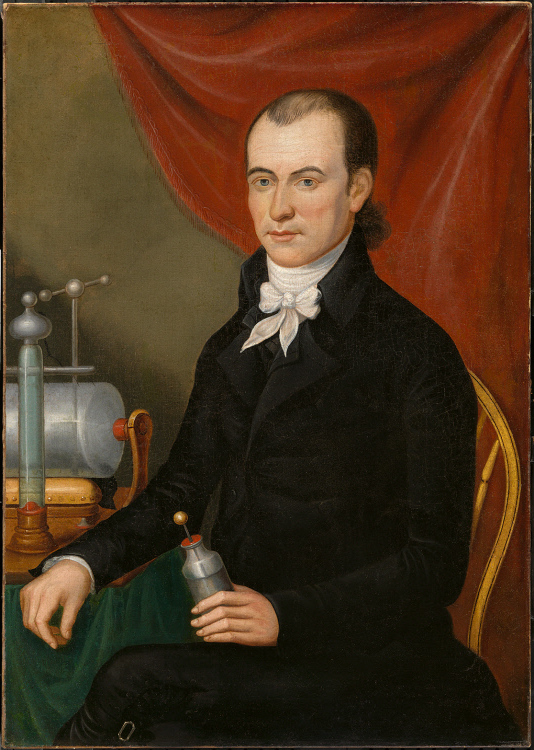
- Charles Peale Polk, David Wiley, c. 1801, in the National Portrait Gallery
- Born: 1768; Pennsylvania, U.S.
- Died: October 14, 1812 (aged 43–44); Fayetteville, North Carolina, U.S.
- Occupations: Surveyor, minister
- Known for: Mayor of Georgetown

David Wiley (1768 – October 14, 1812) was an American surveyor, politician, writer, scientist, and Presbyterian minister who served as postmaster and mayor of Georgetown, District of Columbia.

== Biography ==
=== Early life and ministry ===
David Wiley was born in 1768 in Pennsylvania. He graduated from the College of New Jersey (later Princeton) in 1788. From 1788 to 1789, Wiley was a tutor at Hampden Sidney College in Virginia. Wiley married Susan Wynnkoop and they had four children.

Wiley was ordained as a Presbyterian minister by the Presbytery of Huntingdon on April 9, 1794, and installed as pastor of two congregations in Centre County, Cedar Creek and Spring Creek.

During this period, Wiley also served as the first stated clerk of the Presbytery. He served subsequent congregations and in temporary vacancies until April 1801, when he requested and obtained permission to move to the Presbytery of Baltimore, which covered a wide region that included Virginia.

=== Academic and political career ===
In 1801, Wiley was requested by Stephen Bloomer Balch to move to Georgetown to succeed him as the principal and headmaster of a private school, the Columbian Academy. Wiley also taught several subjects at the academy, including philosophy, mathematics, geography, and Greek. His pupils included Thomas Bloomer Balch.

In 1802, Wiley wrote to President Thomas Jefferson encouraging the appointment of his friend William R. Cozens to be the first Librarian of Congress.

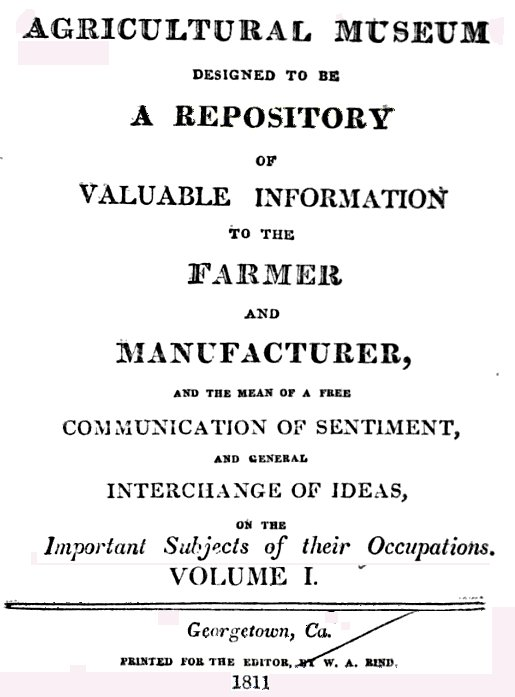
1st Volume of the Agricultural Museum

According to The Papers of Thomas Jefferson, in October 1804, Wiley, along with Abraham Bradley Jr., made a series of astronomical observations near the White House to determine its longitude and latitude.

In 1805, President Jefferson considered appointing Wiley as a leader of the Red River Expedition of the Southwestern United States.

Wiley served as the secretary of the Columbian Agricultural Society.

In 1806, Wiley was elected as a trustee of the Presbyterian Church in Georgetown. He also served as a voting member of the Presbyterian General Assembly.

From 1810 to 1813, Wiley was the first editor of the Agricultural Museum, the first agricultural periodical magazine published in the United States. The magazine discouraged excessive importation in the United States and included Thomas Jefferson among its readers.

Wiley served as Georgetown's postmaster and was appointed by the United States Congress to serve as Turnpike commissioner from 1809 to 1811. From 1811 to 1812, served a one-year term as mayor of Georgetown, succeeding Thomas Corcoran.

=== Death ===
Wiley died on October 14, 1812, while staying at Jordan's Inn in Fayetteville, North Carolina. He had been traveling to the region on a government survey.

=== Legacy ===
An 1801 painting of Wiley by Charles Peale Polk is in the permanent collection of the National Portrait Gallery.

== Bibliography ==
- Benedetto, Robert; Donovan, Jane; Du Vall, Kathleen (2003). Historical Dictionary of Washington, D.C.. Lanham, Md.: Scarecrow Press. ISBN 0810840944.
- Commissioners of the District of Columbia (1913). Annual Report of the Commissioners of the District of Columbia – Year Ended June 30, 1911. Volume IV: Report of the Board of Education. Washington, D.C.: Government Printing Office.
- Taggart, Hugh T. (1908). "Old Georgetown". Records of the Columbia Historical Society: 120–224.
- Tindall, William (1922). "The Executives and Voters of Georgetown, District of Columbia". Records of the Columbia Historical Society. The Society: 89–117. "Daniel Reintzel Georgetown."
- Tindall, William (1909). Origin and Government of the District of Columbia. Washington, D.C.: Government Printing Office.
