= Proctor Lambert Dougherty =

American politician (1873–1966)

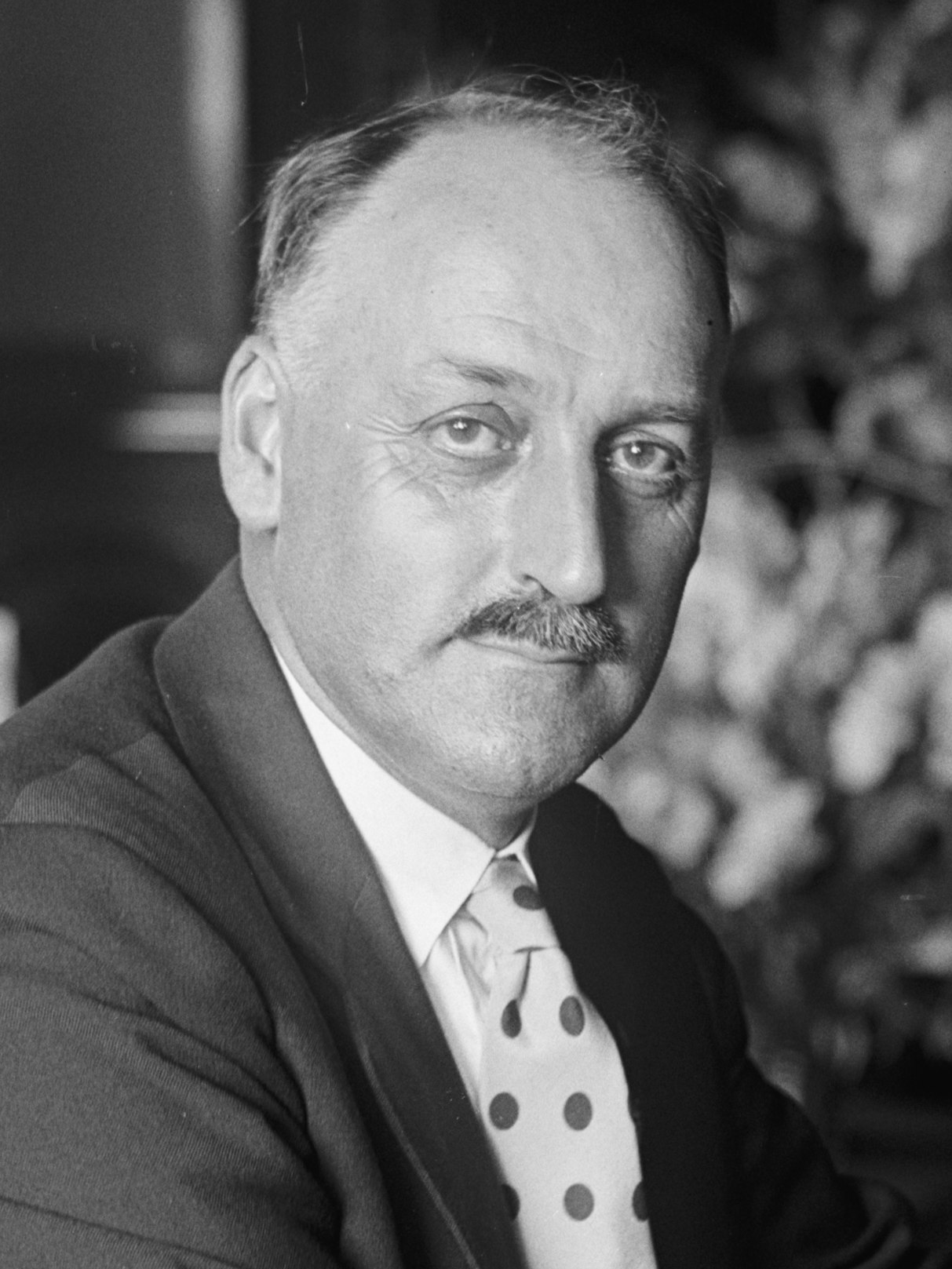
- Dougherty in 1926

15th President of the Board of Commissioners of Washington, D.C.
- In office December 4, 1926 – April 10, 1930
- President: Calvin Coolidge; Herbert Hoover
- Preceded by: Cuno Hugo Rudolph
- Succeeded by: Luther Halsey Reichelderfer

Member of the Board of Commissioners of Washington, D.C.
- In office August 4, 1926 – April 10, 1930
- President: Calvin Coolidge; Herbert Hoover
- Preceded by: Frederick A. Fenning
- Succeeded by: Luther Halsey Reichelderfer

Personal details
- Born: July 9, 1873 Boston, Massachusetts
- Died: October 15, 1966 (aged 93) Kensington, Maryland
- Resting place: Cedar Hill Cemetery
- Party: Republican
- Spouse: Grace Cook Holmes Dougherty
- Children: Proctor L. Dougherty, Jr; Frances Holmes Dougherty; Faith Dougherty Womeldorf; Elizabeth Dougherty
- Education: Massachusetts Institute of Technology
- Profession: Engineer, Politician

Proctor Lambert Dougherty, Sr. (July 9, 1873 – October 15, 1966) was a Washington, D.C., politician who served as the 15th president of the Board of Commissioners of the District of Columbia from 1926 to 1930.

== Early life ==
Dougherty, the child of Rev. M. Angelo Dougherty and Mary L. Proctor, was born in the Dorchester neighborhood of Boston, Massachusetts, in 1873. He studied in the schools in Boston and then graduated from the Massachusetts Institute of Technology with a degree in electrical engineering. He moved to Washington, D.C., in 1899 to take a position in the supervising architects office of the Treasury Department. In 1909 he left to take an engineering position with the Otis Elevator Company and by 1926 was the executive representative in Washington of the vice president of the Otis company.

== Public service ==
Dougherty was a founder of the Citizens' Advisory Council in 1924 and involved with numerous professional and civic organizations. After a lengthy search, Coolidge appointed him to the DC Board of Commissioners on August 4, 1926. He was a recess appointment, made to fill the seat of embattled commissioner Frederick A. Fenning, who resigned before his term was complete in the face of impeachment. In December of that year, when Cuno Rudolph resigned from the board, Dougherty took his place as president and served in that position until April 1930. Dougherty oversaw the police and fire departments and during his time took steps to improve the quality of police officers, instituting a trial board that removed 60 officers and putting in place a set of competitive examinations for promotion. During his time the board began adding street lights to the city and started work on the Municipal Building downtown. The street light purchase was the cause of a scandal that resulted in reorganization within the traffic department. When their terms were up in 1930, President Hoover chose not to reappoint Dougherty or his Democratic counterpart Taliaferro.

== Later life ==
After leaving office, Dougherty returned to engineering for various companies until his retirement in 1958. Dougherty died at Carroll Hall nursing home, where he lived after falling into poor health, in Kensington, Maryland on Oct 15, 1966, and was buried in Cedar Hill Cemetery in Suitland, Maryland.

Political offices
Preceded by Cuno Henry Rudolph	President of the D.C. Board of Commissioners; 1926-1930	Succeeded by Luther Halsey Reichelderfer
