= Oliver Peck Newman =

American politician

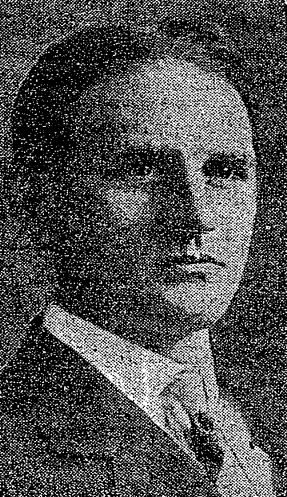

11th President of the Board of Commissioners of Washington, D.C.
- In office February 28, 1913 – October 9, 1917
- President: Woodrow Wilson
- Preceded by: Cuno Hugo Rudolph
- Succeeded by: Louis Brownlow

Personal details
- Born: April 27, 1877 Lincoln, NE
- Died: September 25, 1956. (aged 71) Miami, FL
- Resting place: Arlington National Cemetery
- Party: Democratic
- Spouse: Jane "Jennie" Ellen Bixby McComas Newman
- Education: United States Military Academy
- Profession: Journalist, Politician
- Awards: Order of Merit of Juan Pablo Duarte

Military service
- Branch/service: United States Army
- Years of service: 1917
- Rank: Major
- Unit: 124th Field Artillery, 33rd Infantry,
- Commands: 313th Infantry Regiment
- Battles/wars: World War I; Meuse–Argonne

Oliver Peck Newman (1877-1956) was a Washington, D.C., politician who served as the 11th president of the Board of Commissioners of the District of Columbia, from 1913 to 1917. He was also an advisor to Presidents Woodrow Wilson and Franklin D. Roosevelt and Dominican Republic leader Rafael L. Trujillo.

== Early life ==
Newman, the son of George C. Newman was born in Lincoln, Nebraska, in 1877. His family moved to Des Moines, Iowa, in 1884, where he attended school until 1897, when he left for West Point. After a year at the military academy he was dismissed for failing mathematics. He then moved to Albany and drilled a unit for service in the Spanish-American War, but they never departed. He moved back to Des Moines and became a journalist. He moved to Washington, D.C., in 1901 to work for the Washington Post and then to New Mexico in 1902 to serve as the assistant architect of the sanitarium for lung disease built near Fort Stanton, New Mexico. He then worked at a number of newspapers around the country and in 1903 he was married in Beaumont, Texas. In 1910, he returned to Washington. In 1912 he covered the Wilson campaign, and went with him to Bermuda. At this time, Newman advised Wilson to hold regular press conferences, which is how the modern press conference was created. Later he was one of the people who advised him to give the State of the Union address to Congress in person for the first time since John Adams did it, thereby helping to create that tradition as well.

== Public life ==
In 1913, Wilson appointed him district commissioner, and he served as president of the board until 1917, when he resigned to serve in World War I. His appointment was controversial, as many argued that he did not meet the 3-year residency requirement since he was away covering the Wilson campaign for much of the prior year. As commissioner his main concerns were public health and housing and he worked closely with the President to enact an alley dwelling law and to clear slums. He also served as the first Public Utilities Commissioner in the District of Columbia in 1914.

In World War I he was a major and served on the front lines in France, directing artillery fire. He was also an advisor to Wilson during the Paris Peace Conference. After the war he served as a public relations consultant.

He was an assistant to future Secretary of State Cordell Hull during the 1932 Roosevelt campaign and in 1933, President Roosevelt appointed him the administrator of the foreign debt of the Dominican Republic. For his work, he was awarded the Order of Merit of Juan Pablo Duarte, the Dominican Republic's highest honor. In 1941 Roosevelt returned him there on special assignment under the US Dominican Convention.

== Death and Honors ==
Newman died in 1956 at Miami, Florida at the Miami Heart Institute of a heart condition and was buried in Arlington National Cemetery.

Political offices
Preceded by Cuno Hugo Rudolph	President of the D.C. Board of Commissioners; 1913-1917	Succeeded by Louis Brownlow
