= Henry Brown Floyd MacFarland =

American politician

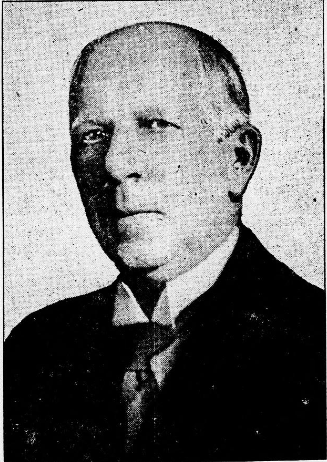
- Henry Brown Floyd MacFarland

9th President of the Board of Commissioners of Washington, D.C.
- In office May 9, 1900 – January 24, 1910
- President: William McKinley; Theodore Roosevelt; William Taft
- Preceded by: John Brewer Wight
- Succeeded by: Cuno Hugo Rudolph

Personal details
- Born: February 11, 1861 Philadelphia, Pennsylvania
- Died: October 14, 1921 (aged 60) Washington, D.C.
- Party: Republican
- Spouse: Mary Lyon Douglass
- Education: George Washington University
- Profession: Reporter, Politician, Attorney

Henry Brown Floyd MacFarland (February 11, 1861 – October 14, 1921) was an American politician who served as a member and president of the D.C. Board of Commissioners.

== Early life ==
Born in Philadelphia, Pennsylvania, on February 11, 1861, Henry MacFarland moved to Washington, D.C. in 1867 with his parents Mr and Mrs. Joseph MacFarland. He studied at Rittenhouse Academy and later at Columbian College, now the George Washington University. He studied the law, but was too young to take the bar, so he instead became a newspaper reporter.

He entered the Washington Bureau of the Boston Herald in 1879 and became chief of that office in 1892.

In 1888 he was married to Mary Lyon Douglass.

== Political career ==
In 1900, President William McKinley appointed him District Commissioner and one week later he was elected President, which was the chief executive office – the equivalent of Mayor – at the time. He was the youngest person ever appointed to the Commission. As President of the Commission, he organized the annual Fourth of July celebration, arranged for the remains of Major Pierre L'Enfant to move from an unmarked grave to Arlington National Cemetery and secured positions at the military academies for District residents. During that time he also served on many commissions including the Rock Creek Board of Control, and committees to preserve Francis Scott Key's home and move the date of the inauguration.

He resigned from office on November 13, 1909 to pursue a career in the law so as to make more money. He served as president of the National Parks Association, and as a member of the Washington Board of Trade and the Chamber of Commerce. He also became very active in the citizens joint committee for national representation.

== Death and legacy ==
MacFarland died in October 1921 after a six-month illness. DC employees were given the day off and flags were flown at half mast for 10 days. MacFarland Middle School in Washington, D.C. was named in his honor.
