= Daniel Reintzel =

Mayor of Georgetown, District of Columbia, United States

- Born: Johan Daniel Reintzel; November 3, 1755; Berks County, Province of Pennsylvania British America
- Died: November 18, 1828 (aged 73); Georgetown, District of Columbia, United States
- Occupation: Real estate developer

Daniel Reintzel (November 3, 1755 – November 18, 1828) was an American merchant who served three terms as mayor of Georgetown, Maryland and mayor of Georgetown, D.C.

== Life and career ==
=== Early life ===
Daniel Reintzel (Note: Early German immigrants would spell the last name phonetically, often spelling the same name in different ways even within the same legal document. The Reintzel name is variously spelled Reintzell, Reinsell, Rientzel, Rientzell, and Rintzel. Many family names altered over time into Ransel, Rinsel, Rensel, Ransil, and other variant spellings.) was born in November 1755 in Berks County, Pennsylvania, to Johan Valentine Reintzel Sr. and Maria Sarah Reintzel (née Riegle). The family came from the Imperial Free City of Hamburg in the Holy Roman Empire (now Germany), emigrating to North America in the early 1700s. He had six brothers (Andreas, George, Johan Jacob, Conrad Jacob, Jorg David, and Valentine) and four sisters (Mariliss, Maria Margreta, Maria Magdalena, and Maria Katerina).

=== Founding Georgetown and Maryland legislative service ===
Almost nothing is known of Reintzel's early life and education, and it is unclear when he moved from Pennsylvania to southern Maryland. But Daniel and his brothers Johan (or John) and Valentine were well-established in Georgetown by 1780. All three brothers were heavily involved in the buying and selling of real estate in the town. Georgetown was chartered as a town by the Province of Maryland on June 8, 1751. The province appointed seven Commissioners to identify property for purchase, lay out the town, and govern it. Reintzel must have been well-established, well-known, and highly respected by 1782, for on May 22 he was appointed clerk to the Georgetown Commissioners (the previous clerk having performed his job poorly). Reintzel served as clerk probably to January 20, 1789, when the Georgetown Commissioners met for the last time.

Georgetown was incorporated by the Maryland General Assembly on December 25, 1789. The town's charter provided for a mayor, recorder, several aldermen, and a "common council" of 10 people. The first recorded meeting of the common council was on November 28, 1791. Reintzel was appointed an alderman and attended the meeting.

On July 9, 1790, Congress passed the Residence Act, which approved the creation of a national capital on the Potomac River. The exact location was to be selected by President George Washington, who chose a portion of the states of Maryland and Virginia on January 24, 1791. Until December 1, 1800, citizens of the District of Columbia were able to vote in federal, state, and local elections in both Maryland and Virginia. Under Maryland law, a free male could vote in Maryland if he owned a minimum of 50 acres (200,000 m^{2}) of land and had £30. (Note: The exchange rate for the British pound and the United States dollar varied considerably by place, social class, and time, but one pound was worth roughly $4 to $5 at the time. Thus, in addition to the property required to vote, Reintzell needed $120 to $150, or (at the lower boundary) about $2,276 in 2025 dollars.) Reintzel ran for and won election to the Maryland House of Delegates in 1794 and 1795 and served one-year terms as a delegate from Montgomery County in 1795 and 1796.

=== Mayor of Georgetown ===
Reintzel was elected Mayor of Georgetown on January 4, 1796, to a one-year term. Other members of the Reintzel family were also prominent in town affairs at this time: Valentine Reintzel served on the Georgetown Common Council in 1791, and brothers Anthony and Johan served on separate committees in 1800 which investigated incidents of yellow fever in the mid-Atlantic area.

Reintzel's first term of office ended on January 1, 1797. He was replaced as mayor by Lloyd Beall, brother of George Beall (whose land was condemned in order to found the town). But Beall received a commission in the Continental Army, which was then fighting in the American Revolutionary War. Believing he could not serve as mayor and in the army at the same time, he resigned on October 19, 1799. Reintzel was elected mayor the same day. Reintzel's mayoralty was widely supported by the people of the town, which was growing rapidly during this period. He served one-year terms as mayor continuously for the next three years.

Reintzel stepped down as mayor at the beginning of January 1803 in favor of the new mayor, wealthy landowner Thomas Corcoran. Corcoran served two terms as mayor, and Reintzel was again elected mayor in 1805. He served two terms as mayor before stepping down for good on January 3, 1808.

=== Post-mayoral life ===
Daniel Reintzel married Elizabeth Waughop in 1804. He owned at least three African slaves during his lifetime, including one named Abraham Aftley. Aftley had been owned by Lloyd Beall and was purchased at some point by Reintzel. Reintzel freed Aftley on March 26, 1806, and required no payment from Aftley or anyone else in order to give Aftley his freedom.

In November 1812, President James Madison appointed Reintzel justice of the peace for Washington County (that part of the District of Columbia outside Georgetown and the City of Washington).

== Supreme Court cases ==
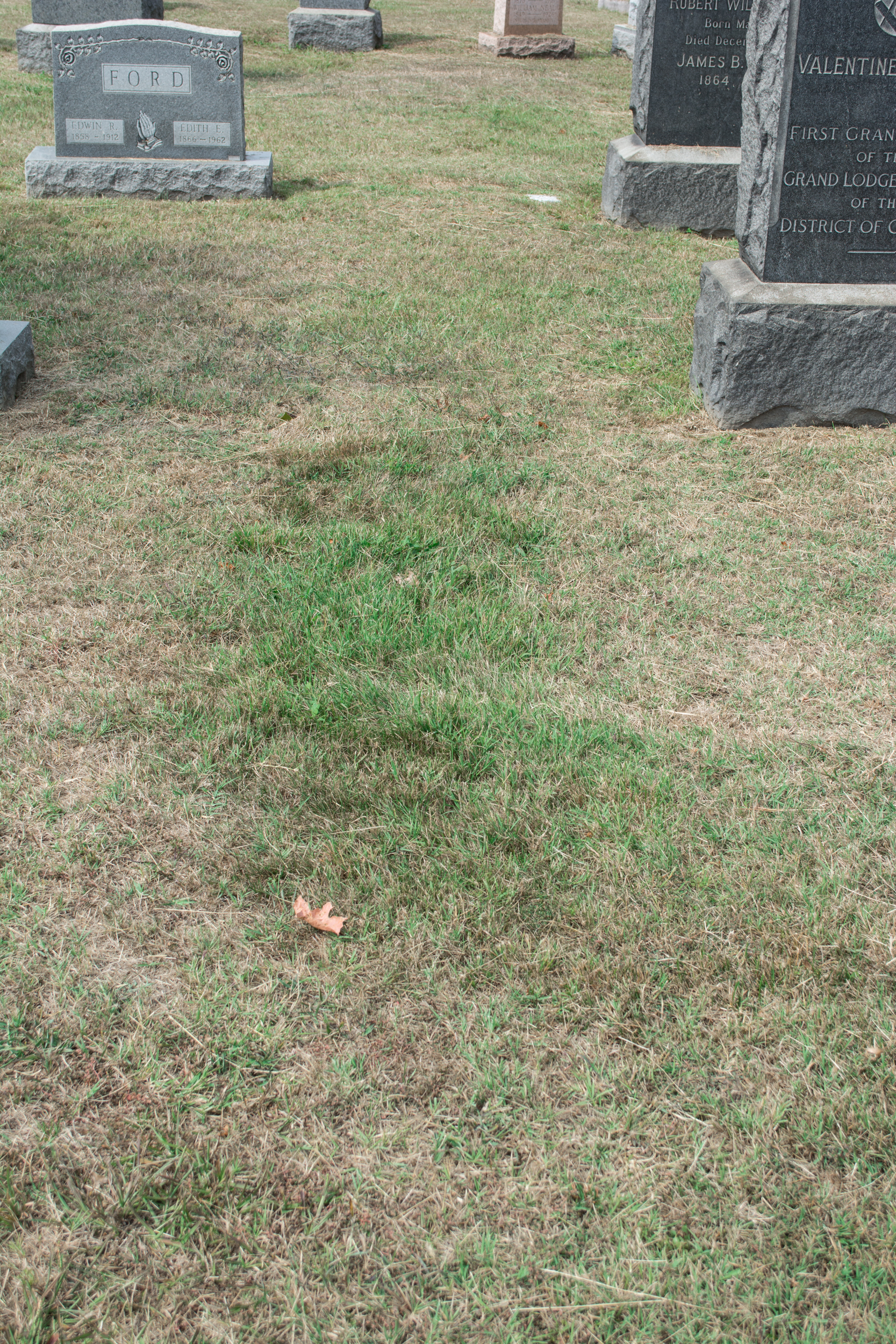
Unmarked grave of Daniel Reintzel at Glenwood Cemetery.

In the last two decades of his life, Reintzel was involved in two legal actions—both of which ended up before the Supreme Court of the United States.

The first case, Mountz v. Hodgson and Thompson, 8 U.S. 324 (1808)., involved an action taken by Reintzel as mayor. His brother, George, and a business partner, Jacob Mountz, had taken out a loan in 1805. They defaulted on this loan, and the lenders, one Hodgson and Thompson, sought relief. Maryland law allowed the lenders to avoid seizure of their goods if they swore before two justices of the peace that they were liable for the loan. This avoided a lengthy court proceeding to prove that the debt had, in fact, been incurred. Mountz, without George Reintzel, went before justices of the peace John Ott and Daniel Reintzel and affirmed the debt. But Daniel Reintzel signed his name as Mayor of Georgetown, rather than as Justice of the Peace for Washington County. Six months later, Hodgson and Thompson attempted to seize the goods of Mountz in payment of the debt. Mountz sued for relief, claiming that Reintzel had signed in his capacity as mayor rather than justice of the peace, and that George Reintzel was not present for the affirmation. The Supreme Court overruled Mountz on both issues.

The second legal action (Bank of the United States v. Corcoran, 27 U.S. 121 (1829).) began in 1822 and was decided in January 1829 (two months after his death). Reintzel took out a loan for $3,700 on May 6, 1819, from the Bank of Columbia. The loan was guaranteed by Thomas Corcoran. A second and third loan, each in the amount of $400, was secured by Reintzel in May 1819. When the loans came due, Reintzel refused to pay. The bank sought payment from Corcoran as endorser of the first loan, and left notice for him at the store owned by his son, James Corcoran. The bank sued in court, and a default judgment issued against Thomas Corcoran. Corcoran counter-sued, arguing that he had never properly been notified of the suit. The bank asked the court to instruct the jury that leaving the notice at the store was sufficient, since Corcoran lived above the store. The court declined, and the jury found for Corcoran (e.g., he had not been properly notified of the suit). The bank appealed to the U.S. Supreme Court, which held that no error had been committed. It affirmed the jury's finding.

Reintzel's brother, Anthony, was a litigant involved in a third Supreme Court case, Morgan v. Reintzel, 11 U.S. 273 (1812)..

== Death ==
Reintzel died of unspecified causes at his home on November 18, 1828. He had just celebrated his 73rd birthday. He was initially interred at the Presbyterian Burying Ground in Georgetown, a cemetery for the town's elite.

The Presbyterian Burying Ground was largely abandoned by 1891. By 1907, its owners had agreed to have all bodies in the cemetery removed so that the land might be converted to a city park. Reintzel's body was disinterred in November 1907 and—according to the Washington Evening Star newspaper—was reburied at Prospect Hill Cemetery. This report was incorrect; Daniel Reintzel was reburied in the Masonic Circle at Glenwood Cemetery in Washington, D.C.

== Bibliography ==
- Evelyn, Douglas; Dickson, Paul; Ackerman, S.J. (2008). On This Spot: Pinpointing the Past in Washington, D.C. Sterling, Va.: Capital Books. ISBN 9781933102702.
- Gwin, William R. (September 1967). Potomac Lodge No. 5, 1058 Thomas Jefferson Street (Georgetown), Washington, D.C. HABS No. DC-153 (PDF). Historic American Buildings Survey. Washington, D.C.: National Park Service, Department of the Interior.
- Looney, J. Jefferson, ed. (2004). The Papers of Thomas Jefferson. Retirement Series. Volume 1. Princeton, N.J.: Princeton University Press. ISBN 9780691124902.
- Phillips, Nicola (2013). The Profligate Son: Or, A True Story of Family Conflict, Fashionable Vice, and Financial Ruin in Regency Britain. New York: Basic Books. ISBN 9780465008926.
- Reinsel, W.E. (1976). The Reinsels of Pennsylvania: A History of the Reinsel Family of Berks, Clarion, and Lebanon Counties and the Rensel Family of Butler County. Inkster, Mich.: W.E. Reinsel.
- Rogers, Helen Hoban (2007). Freedom and Slavery Documents in the District of Columbia. Volume 1. Baltimore, Md.: Gateway Press.
- Taggart, Hugh T. (1908). "Old Georgetown". Records of the Columbia Historical Society: 120–224.
- Tindall, William (1922). "The Executives and Voters of Georgetown, District of Columbia". Records of the Columbia Historical Society. The Society: 89–117. "Daniel Reintzel Georgetown."
- Tindall, William (1909). Origin and Government of the District of Columbia. Washington, D.C.: Government Printing Office.
