= John Wesley Ross =

American politician

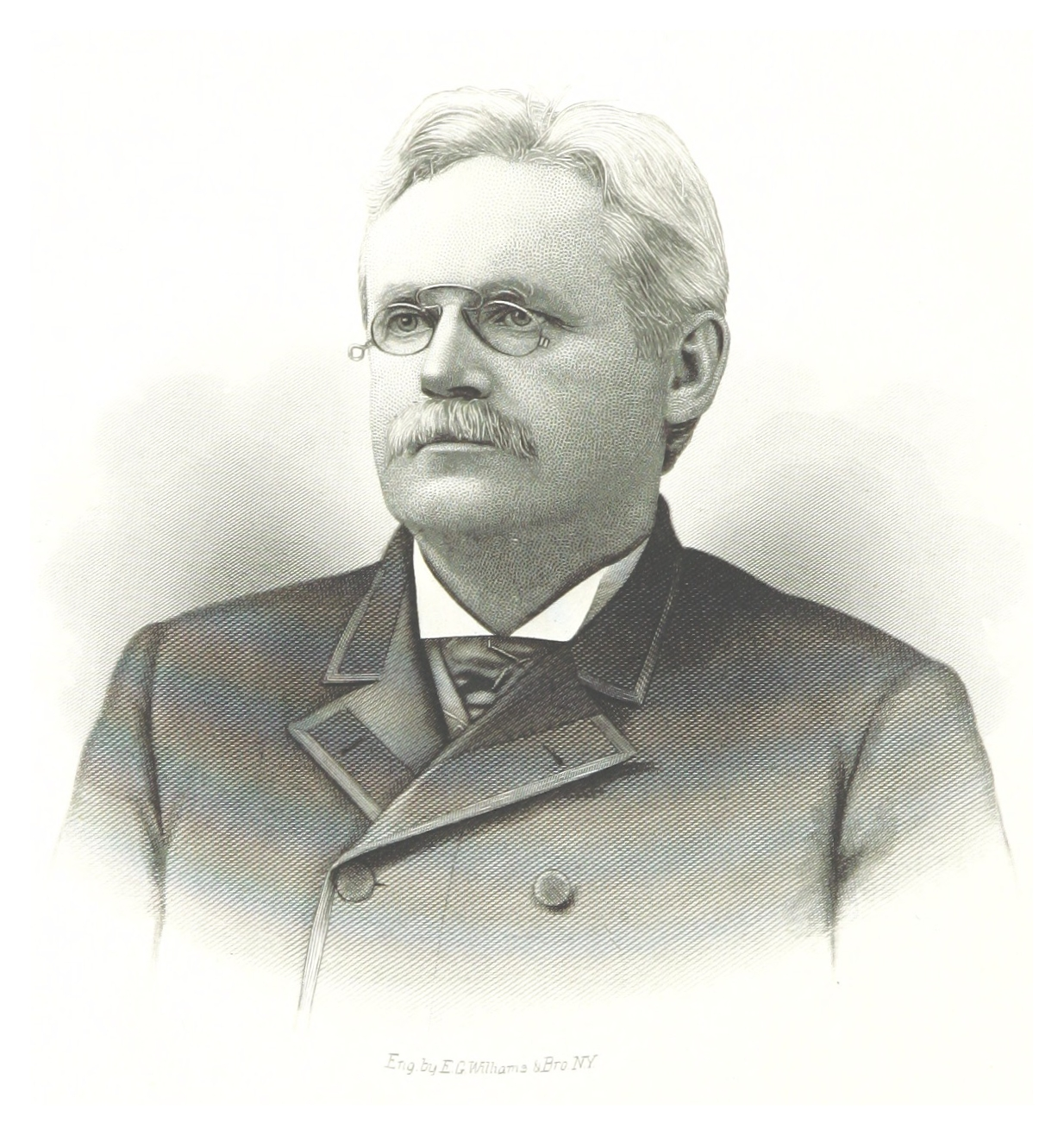

Member of the Illinois House of Representatives
- In office 1868–1872

7th President of the Board of Commissioners of Washington, D.C.
- In office March 1, 1893 – June 1, 1898
- President: Grover Cleveland; William McKinley
- Preceded by: John Watkinson Douglass
- Succeeded by: John Brewer Wight

Member of the Board of Commissioners of Washington, D.C.
- In office October 1, 1890 – July 29, 1902
- President: Grover Cleveland; William McKinley; Theodore Roosevelt
- Preceded by: Lemon G. Hine
- Succeeded by: Henry Litchfield West

Personal details
- Born: June 23, 1841 Lewistown, Illinois, US
- Died: July 29, 1902 (aged 61) Washington, D.C., US
- Party: Democratic
- Spouse(s): Emma Brown Tenney; Isabella McCullough
- Children: 5
- Education: Illinois College; Harvard Law School
- Profession: Attorney, Politician

John Wesley Ross (June 23, 1841 – July 29, 1902) was an American attorney who served as postmaster of Washington, D.C., as president of the D.C. Public Schools Board of Trustees, and as a member and president of the D.C. Board of Commissioners.

== Personal life ==
Born in Lewistown, Illinois, on June 23, 1841, John W. Ross was the oldest son of Lewis Winans Ross and Frances M. (Simms) Ross, and a grandson of Ossian M. Ross and Mary (Winans) Ross. His father Lewis Ross was a prominent lawyer and United States Congressman from Illinois. His grandfather Ossian Ross was a pioneer settler in Illinois, and founder of the towns of Lewistown and Havana.

John Ross was married in June 1870 to Emma Brown Tenney, daughter of Franklin Tenney, who was for many years the proprietor of the National Hotel in Washington, D.C. John and Emma Ross had five children: three sons and two daughters. Their oldest son, Col. Tenney Ross, served as U.S. Army Chief of Staff, 79th Division, in World War I. Emma died on January 31, 1879. John then married Isabella Toner, widow of Henry L. McCullough, on September 24, 1888.

== Education ==
Ross received his early education in private schools and then attended the Lewistown Seminary from 1853 to 1856. In the fall of 1856, Ross enrolled as a student at the Illinois College in Jacksonville, Illinois. However, he and three other students were denied their diplomas in 1862 due to a dispute between students and faculty regarding freedom of speech during their commencement orations. The dispute concerned the students' freedom to address issues related to the American Civil War. Despite the lack of a diploma, Ross attended Harvard Law School in 1864 and 1865. Ross and the other three Illinois College students were eventually restored to their class and granted their diplomas in 1891.

== Career ==
Ross was admitted to the bar in Springfield, Illinois, in January 1866 and practiced law in Lewistown until 1873. From 1868 to 1872, he was also a member of the Illinois House of Representatives, representing Fulton County. In April 1873, Ross was admitted to the bar of the U.S. Supreme Court and he then practiced law in Washington, D.C., for several years. In October 1883, Ross was appointed as a lecturer at Georgetown University on subjects of common law, torts, and domestic relations. He was honored by the university with an LL.D. degree in 1885.

Ross served as D.C. postmaster from 1888 to September 30, 1890. While in that position, he doubled the number of branch post offices and increased their efficiency; increased the clerical force and regulated their work hours more equally; and abolished Sunday afternoon mail delivery, to the relief of the mail carriers. Ross also served as president of the D.C. Public Schools Board of Trustees from 1888 to 1892.

On September 11, 1890, he was appointed as a member of the D.C. Board of Commissioners by President Benjamin Harrison, and he was reappointed to that position in 1894 by President Grover Cleveland and again in 1897 and 1890 by President William McKinley. He served until his death in 1902, making him the 2nd longest serving member of the board behind only John Russel Young. From 1893 to 1898 he served as president of the Board (a position equivalent to mayor).

By virtue of his position as commissioner as well as president of the Public Schools Board of Trustees, John Ross engaged in correspondence with Booker T. Washington in 1900 concerning recommendations for the position of Superintendent of Colored Schools in the District of Columbia. One of the persons under consideration was W. E. B. Du Bois, although ultimately the position was eliminated by Congressional action in mid-1900, in favor of a system of one superintendent and two assistant superintendents, one of whom was to be black. In 1898, Ross was invited by Alexander Graham Bell to give an oral presentation at the Hubbard Memorial Meeting of the National Geographic Society, in honor of the late president of the society, Gardiner Greene Hubbard. Ross was also involved in negotiations with Andrew Carnegie in 1901 regarding funding for the Lewistown Carnegie Public Library, which was finally completed in 1906.

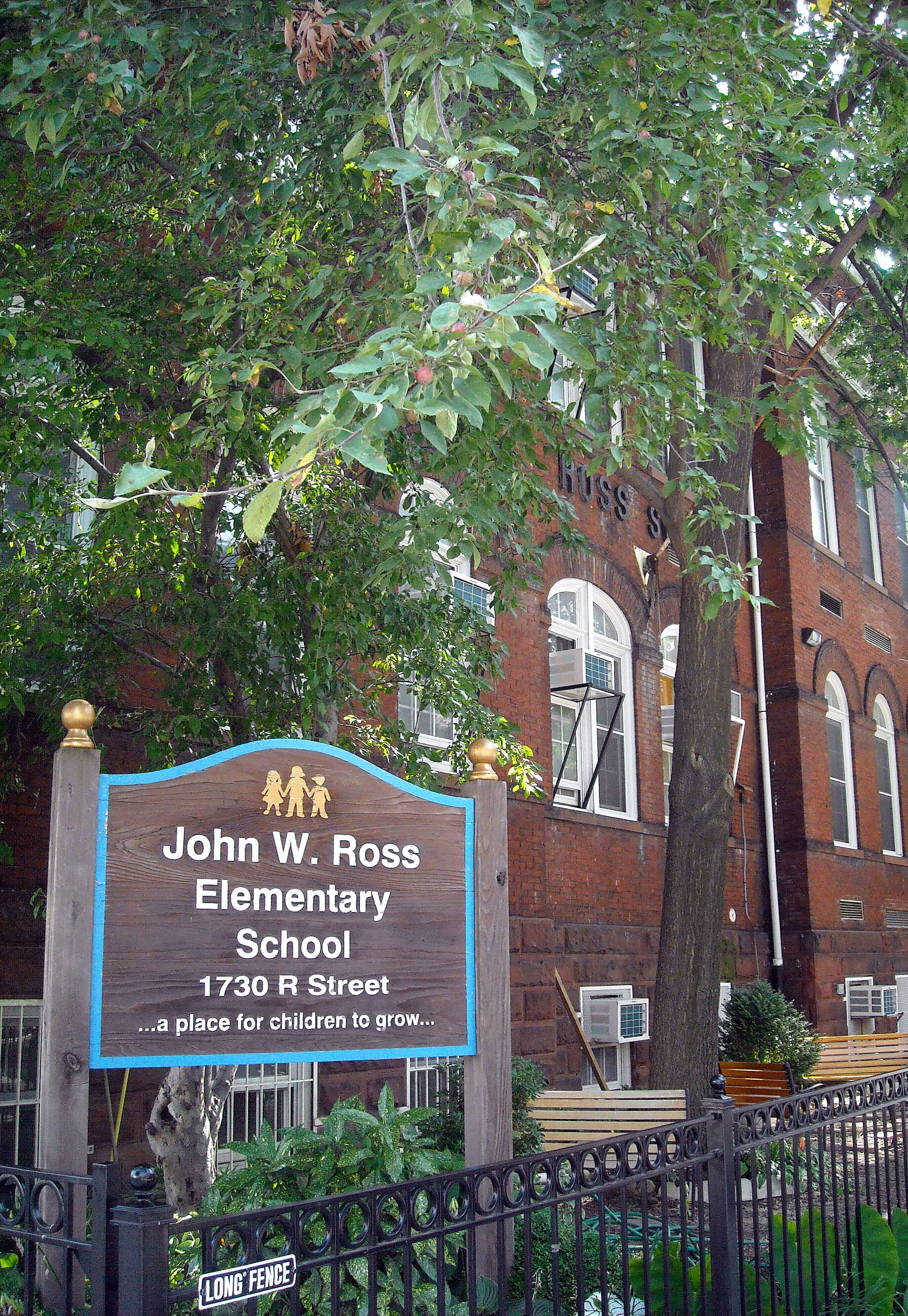

== Political views ==
Ross was a member of the Democratic Party, as was his father, Lewis Winans Ross. In the political campaign of 1896, John Ross broke ranks with the main Democratic Party and supported the cause of the "gold Democrats", who advocated against the "free silver" policies of William Jennings Bryan. In general, however, Ross' conservative administration of the affairs of the District of Columbia received support from members of both political parties.

== Death and funeral ==
Ross died of a heart attack in his home in Washington, D.C., on July 29, 1902. His funeral was attended by a large number of Washington, D.C., officials and employees, as well as representatives of the national government and the business world; President Theodore Roosevelt donated a large wreath to the funeral. The death of Ross was a major blow to his mother, who died in October, 1902, as a consequence of an illness dating from his death.

== Legacy ==
Ross was "one of the most universally popular men that has ever been a member of the District's governing triumvirate," highly regarded for his kind heart, great integrity, dedicated service, and respect for D.C. residents. As a tribute, the Ross Elementary School, currently located at 1730 R Street, N.W., in Washington, D.C., was named in his honor. The school's mission statement is R: Rigorous Academics; O: Open-minded, Respectful Community; S: Strong Sense of Self; S: Service to Others.

Political offices
Preceded by John Watkinson Douglass	President of the D.C. Board of Commissioners; 1889-1893	Succeeded by John Brewer Wight
