= Luther Halsey Reichelderfer =

American politician

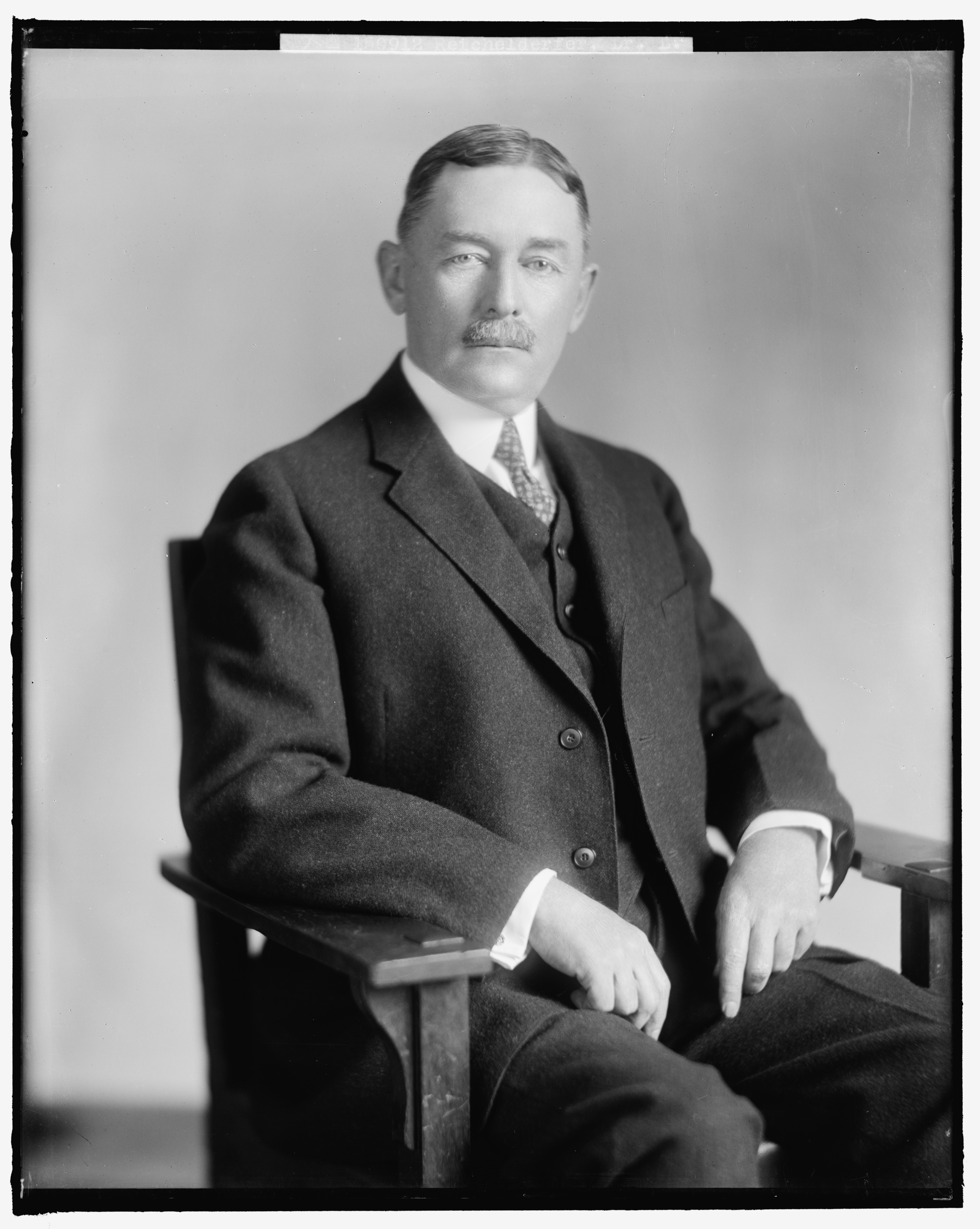
- Reichelderfer in 1905

16th President of the Board of Commissioners of Washington, D.C.
- In office April 10, 1930 – November 16, 1933
- President: Herbert Hoover; Franklin D. Roosevelt
- Preceded by: Proctor Lambert Dougherty
- Succeeded by: Melvin Colvin Hazen

Personal details
- Born: February 4, 1874 Hallsville, Ohio, US
- Died: June 19, 1945. (aged 71) Washington, DC, US
- Party: Republican
- Spouse: Mary McCauley
- Education: Columbian University
- Profession: Doctor, Politician

Military service
- Branch/service: United States Army
- Years of service: 1895-1917 (National Guard); 1917–1919 (Army); 1919-1921 (Army Reserve)
- Rank: Colonel (Army Reserve)
- Unit: Medical Corps
- Battles/wars: World War I

Luther Halsey Reichelderfer (1874–1945) was a Washington, D.C., politician who served as the 16th president of the Board of Commissioners of the District of Columbia, from 1930 to 1933. He was also a founder of the American College of Surgeons and the first commander of the District of Columbia National Guard's Medical Corps.

== Early life ==
Reichelderfer was born in Hallsville, Ohio, in 1873 and moved to Washington, D.C., when he was 3 years old. He attended the Franklin School and Central High School in DC and then Columbian University, where he received his medical degree in 1899. He practiced medicine in Washington, D.C., at Garfield, Children's and Tuberculosis Hospitals, while teaching at the George Washington University of medicine until he retired from medicine in 1924.

Reichelderfer had a 26-year military career as well. In high school he'd been a colonel in the school cadet corps. After graduating he was hired as the assistant military instructor of the High School Cadet Corps and in 1895 became a Lieutenant in the District Guard. He was an accomplished marksman with the guard who participated in national competitions and instructed others on shooting. In 1905 he was promoted to Lieutenant Colonel and in 1909 put in charge of the new Medical Corps as Surgeon General. In 1915, he was called up to U.S. Military service with the rank of Major and began preparing troops for service along the Texas border, but was discharged when they departed Fort Myer. He was called up again and promoted to lieutenant Colonel as part of the AEF during World War I and deployed to France. Upon returning to the states he was promoted to the rank of Colonel in the Medical Reserve Corps and then left the military in 1921.

== Public life ==
Despite no prior political background, President Hoover appointed Reichelderfer to the District of Columbia's Board of Commissioners in 1930 on the advice of the District of Columbia Medical Society. As his term coincided with the Great Depression his advice on matters of public health and social welfare were considered of high value.

== Death and honors ==
Reichelderfer died on June 19, 1945, at his home in Adams Morgan. DC flags were flown at half-staff in his honor. He was buried in Arlington National Cemetery.

Political offices
Preceded by Proctor Lambert Dougherty	President of the D.C. Board of Commissioners; 1930-1933	Succeeded by Melvin Colvin Hazen
