= John Brewer Wight =

American politician (1853–1923)

8th President of the Board of Commissioners of Washington, D.C.
- In office June 1, 1898 – May 1, 1900
- President: William McKinley
- Preceded by: John Wesley Ross
- Succeeded by: Henry Brown Floyd MacFarland

Member of the Board of Commissioners of Washington, D.C.
- In office May 8, 1897 – May 1, 1900
- President: William McKinley
- Preceded by: George Truesdell
- Succeeded by: Henry Brown Floyd MacFarland

Personal details
- Born: March 2, 1853 Washington, D.C., U.S.
- Died: March 31, 1923 (aged 70) Montclair, New Jersey, U.S.
- Resting place: Oak Hill Cemetery; Washington, D.C., U.S.
- Party: Independent
- Spouse: Anna K. Kumler
- Children: 1
- Profession: Businessman; politician

John Brewer Wight (March 2, 1853 – March 31, 1923) was the eighth president of the Board of Commissioners of the District of Columbia, serving from 1898 to 1900.

== Early life ==
John Brewer Wight was born on March 2, 1853, in Washington, D.C. to Mary Isabella (née Buchanan) and Otis Caleb Wight. He attended Rittenhouse Academy.

== Career ==
Wight was Supervisor of Gallaudet College and later entered the real estate and insurance businesses. He was one of the first secretaries of the Washington Board of Trade. He served on the Board of Commissioners of the District of Columbia for two terms starting in 1897. He served as President for three years. After serving as commissioner, Wight became a director in the Alpha Portland Cement Company and was later made the general manager of the firm's New York office. He retired in 1921.

== Personal life ==
Wight married Anna Kumler. They had one son: Goulding K. Wight.

Around 1904, Wight moved to Montclair, New Jersey. In June 1922 he was struck by a truck in New York City and the injuries from that crash led to his death. He died on March 31, 1923, at his home in Montclair. He was interred at Oak Hill Cemetery in Washington, D.C.

Political offices
Preceded by John Wesley Ross	President of the D.C. Board of Commissioners; 1898-1900	Succeeded by Henry Brown Floyd MacFarland
