= Oyster-Adams Bilingual School =

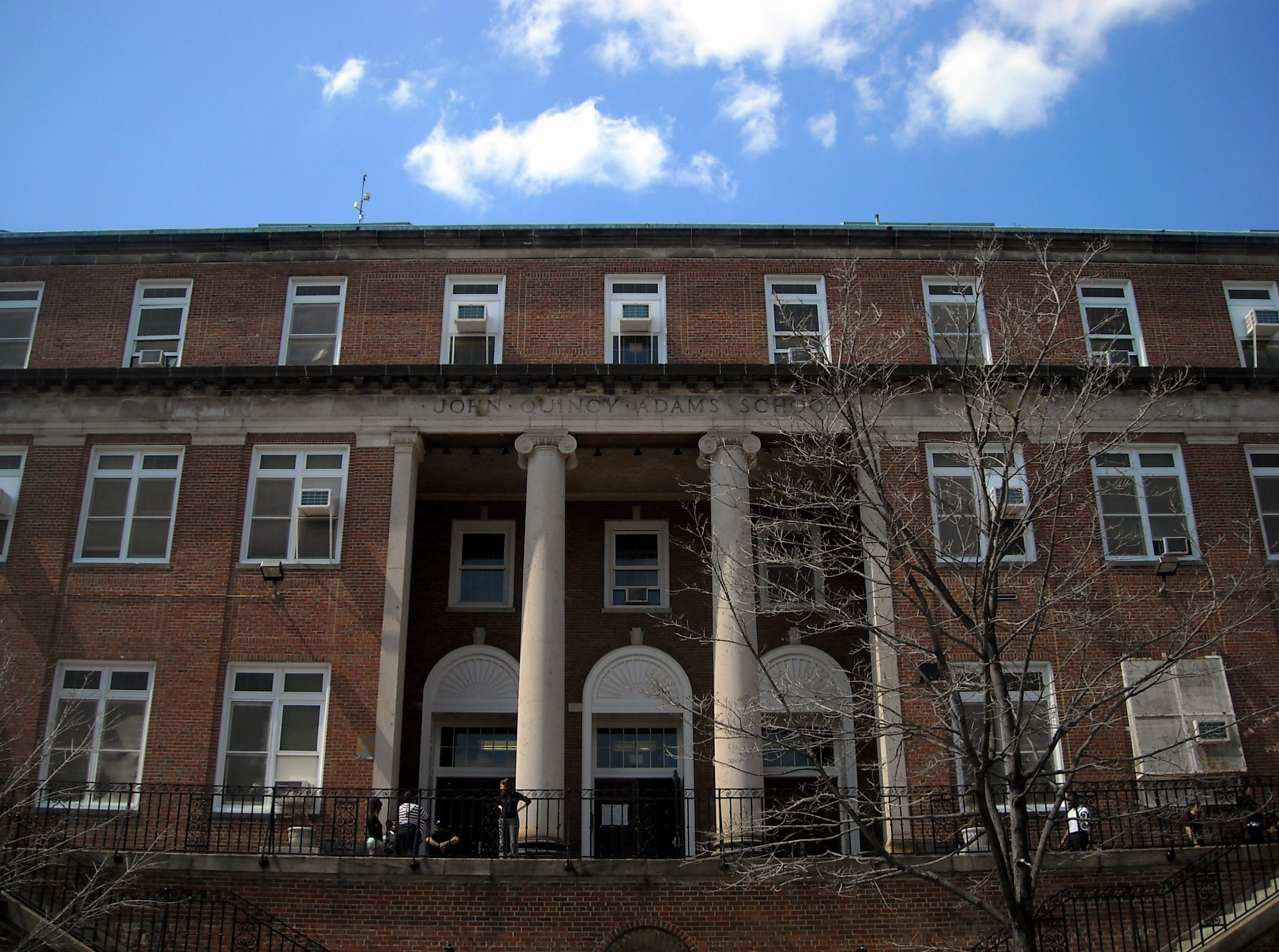
- Adams Campus

Location
- 2801 Calvert Street NW (Oyster Campus); 2020 19th Street NW (Adams Campus); Washington, D.C. United States

Information
- Former names: James F. Oyster School; John Quincy Adams School
- Type: K-8 school
- Established: September 20, 1926; 100 years ago
- Status: Open
- School board: District of Columbia State Board of Education
- School district: District of Columbia Public Schools
- NCES District ID: 1100030
- NCES School ID: 110003000160
- Principal: Carolina Brito
- Grades: PK-8
- Enrollment: 781
- Language: Bilingual (English-Spanish)
- Mascot: Tigres
- Affiliation: International Spanish Academy (ISA)
- Website: oysteradamsbilingual.org

Oyster-Adams Bilingual School (Oyster-Adams or OA) is a bilingual (English-Spanish) K-8 school in Washington, D.C. The Oyster Campus in Woodley Park serves grades PK to 3 and the Adams Campus in Adams Morgan serves grades 4 to 8. It is part of the District of Columbia Public Schools system.

== History ==
The schools that formed Oyster-Adams date back to 1926. The current form of the school, Oyster-Adams Bilingual School, was created through the merger of the James F. Oyster School and the John Quincy Adams School in 2007.

=== James F. Oyster School ===
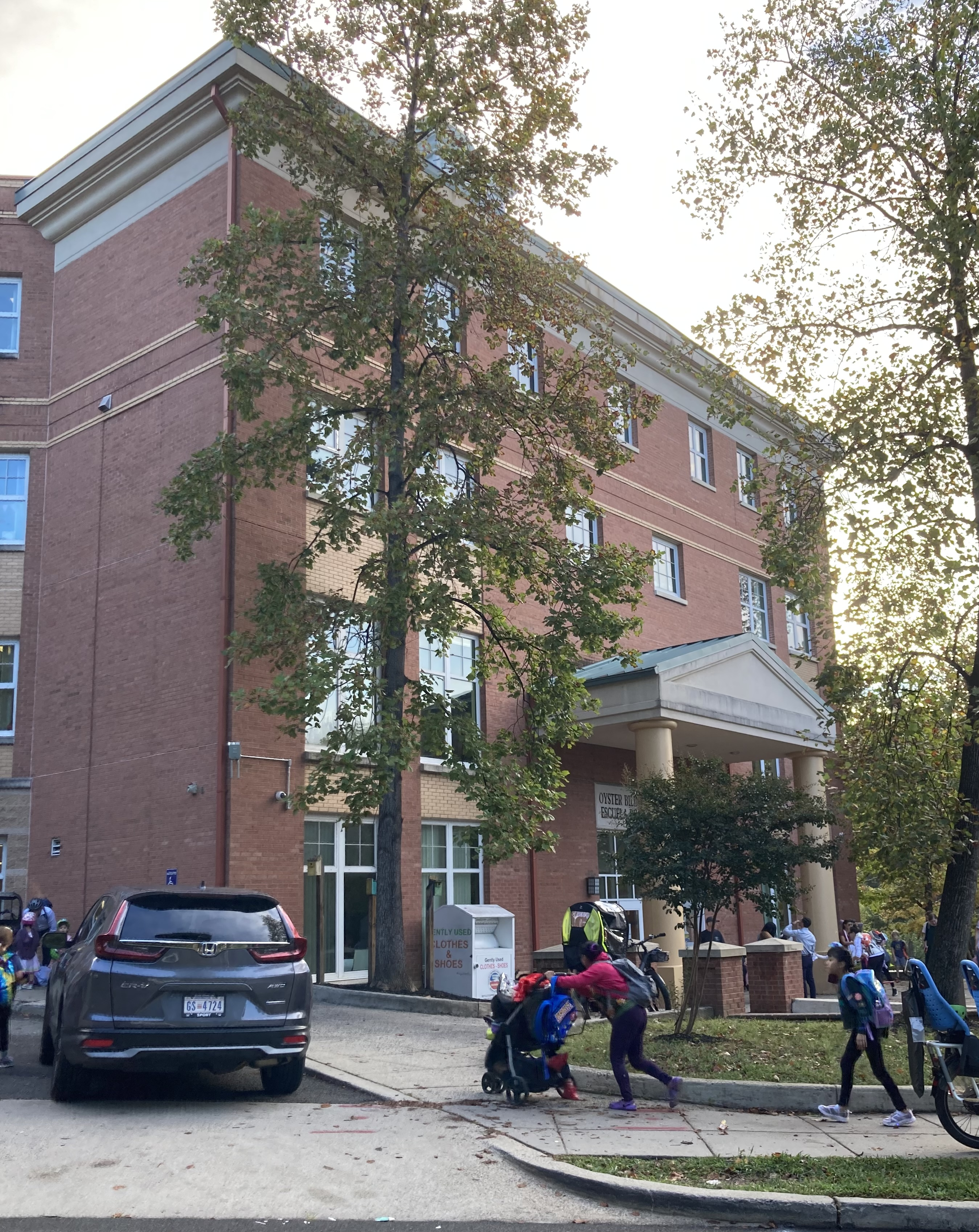
The Oyster campus of the Oyster-Adams Bilingual School in Woodley Park.

The James F. Oyster School opened on September 20, 1926, at the intersection of 29th St NW and Calvert St NW in the Woodley Park neighborhood of Washington, D.C. The school was built over a period of ten months by contractor George E. Wyne at a cost of $250,000. The school was named after Captain James F. Oyster, a member of the D.C. Board of Education. The school opened with 208 students in grades Kindergarten through 5th grade.

In the 1950s the school took part in an experimental language instruction program offering instruction in French, Spanish and German.

The Oyster School's English-Spanish bilingual program started in 1971 and became a showplace of the bilingual movement, attracting visitors from around the world. In February 1983, a seminar entitled "The History and Politics of the Oyster Bilingual School" was offered at the National Association for Bilingual Education’s convention, followed by a tour of the school.

First Lady Rosalynn Carter persuaded national industry leaders to support the Oyster School.

By 1993, the original building had become rundown at DCPS proposed closing the school. An Oyster parent founded the 21st Century School Fund which enabled the replacement of Oyster with a new building, utilizing a novel public-private partnership. This approach involved a land exchange and a bond repaid by revenue from a new apartment complex, the Henry Adams House Apartments, with the project spearheaded by the 21st Century School Fund and developed by LCOR Inc. LCOR and partner Northwestern Mutual Life Insurance Co. will make $804,000 annual payments in lieu of property taxes to the city for 35 years. Those payments will cover the $11 million revenue bond used to plan, design, construct and furnish the new building.

=== John Quincy Adams School ===
The John Quincy Adams School opened in 1929 on 19th Street NW, between California Street NW and Vernon Street NW. The school was named after President of the United States John Quincy Adams.

When it opened, it only served white students and the previous neighborhood school, the Thomas P. Morgan School, became a school for African American students. After the passage of Brown v. Board of Education in 1954, parents and teachers from the two segregated elementary schools came together in 1955 to implement desegregation. They formed the Adams-Morgan Better Neighborhood Conference and the Adams Morgan name stuck, giving the neighborhood the name it still has today. The Morgan School, located at the intersection of California Street NW and 18th Street NW, was demolished in the 1970s and replaced with the new Marie H. Reed Community Learning Center which was dedicated on May 7, 1978.

The Adams School had a nuclear fallout shelter in its basement. In 2017 a Washington Post reporter and a Smithsonian curator discovered it had been untouched for 55 years and reported on what they found.

=== Merger ===
In 2007, the James F. Oyster School and the John Quincy Adams School merged to become Oyster-Adams Bilingual School, a PK-8 bilingual school. Both buildings remain in use with the Oyster Campus serving grades PK-3 and the Adams Campus serving grades 4-8.

=== Modernization ===
In 2022 a $1.5 million project replaced two playgrounds and renovated the turf field at the Oyster Campus. Mayor of the District of Columbia Muriel Bowser joined students, school staff, and families to cut the ribbon for the new playground on October 31, 2022.

In October 2022 the District of Columbia Department of General Services issued a Request for Proposals interested in serving as the design-builder for the modernization of Adams Education Campus of the Oyster-Adams Bilingual School. The budget for the project is $55m.

== Notable Events ==
- December 1941 - Kalorama Defense Area rallies were held at the Adams School. Eight-hundred people attended, including Chief Justice of the United States Harlan F. Stone and First Lady of the United States Edith Wilson.
- May 1942 - The Adams School was a distribution point for Sugar Ration Books for thousands of residents that lived in the area.
- 1960s - The Adams School was the location of the Americanization School of the District of Columbia where people studied to become American citizens. In 1965 alone, 1400 students from 93 nations studied there to become American citizens.
- May 1980 - First Lady of the United States Rosalynn Carter and the first United States Secretary of Education Shirley Hufstedler visited classrooms and spoke to an assembly of the school's 325 students about the importance of bilingual education. The visit was part of celebrating the opening of the new U.S. Department of Education.
- November 1996 - The local chapter of the Daughters of the American Revolution raised funds and brought 27 students from the Oyster School to Plymouth, Massachusetts, in an effort to make a mark on their community.
- January 2009 - Colombian singer Shakira visited Oyster-Adams and read to students. She also announced a sister-school relationship with a Colombian elementary school, Escuela Gabriel García Márquez, located outside of Bogota.
- March 2011 - First Lady of the United States Michelle Obama and First Lady of Mexico Margarita Zavala visited the school and read to students.
- May 2023 - Deputy Secretary of Education Cindy Marten visited the school as part of her "Raise the Bar: Lead the World" tour. While there she learned hosted a roundtable discussion with students, parents, and teachers and announced the U.S. Department of Education's new "Free to Learn" initiative.

== Honors ==
- On October 16, 2003, U.S. Congressman Rubén Hinojosa, made a tribute to Oyster Bilingual School on the floor of the United States House of Representatives, calling it a "a model for the Nation" and entered his tribute into the Congressional Record.
- 2020 Awardee, National Blue Ribbon Schools Program

== Affiliations ==
Oyster-Adams is affiliated with the International Spanish Academy (ISA) Program, an educational outreach initiative of the Ministry of Education and Vocational Training of Spain that provides support, consultancy and recognition from the Ministry.
