= Cuno Hugo Rudolph =

American politician (1860–1932)

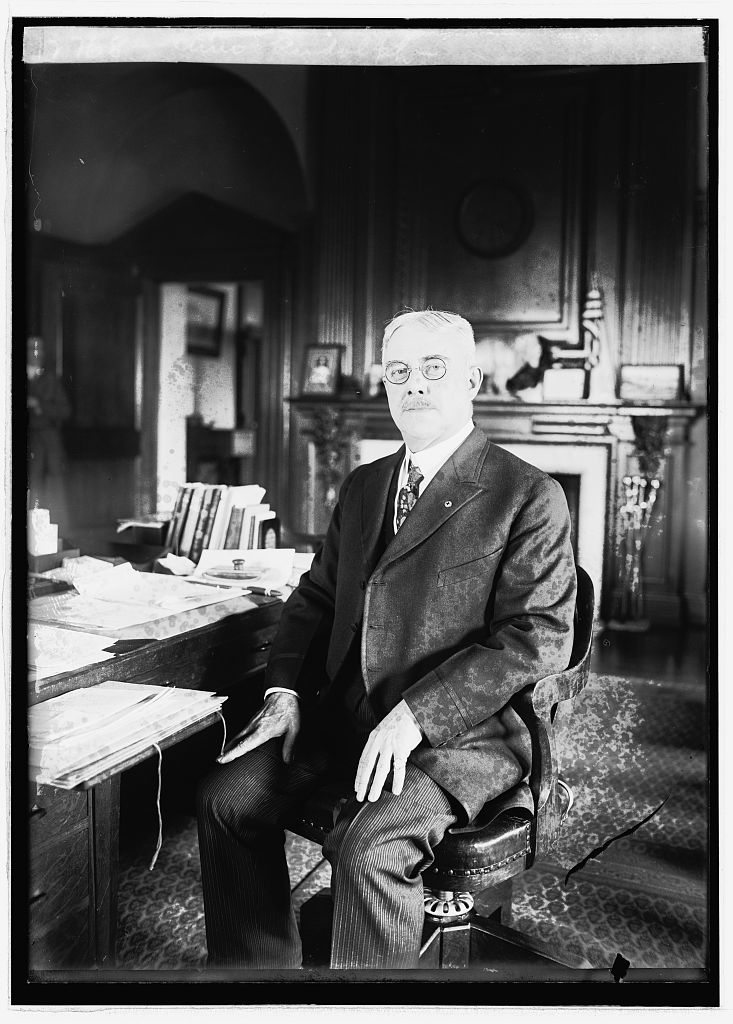
- Rudolph during his 2nd term

10th and 14th President of the Board of Commissioners of Washington, D.C.
- In office March 15, 1921 – December 4, 1926
- President: Warren G. Harding; Calvin Coolidge
- Preceded by: John Thilman Hendrick
- Succeeded by: Proctor L. Dougherty
- In office January 24, 1910 – February 28, 2013
- President: William Howard Taft
- Preceded by: Henry Brown Floyd MacFarland
- Succeeded by: Oliver Peck Newman

Personal details
- Born: January 26, 1860 Baltimore, Maryland, U.S.
- Died: January 6, 1932 (aged 71) Washington, D.C., U.S.
- Party: Republican
- Spouse: Amy Edna Merz Rudolph (m. 1901)
- Education: Stadtler Business College; Bryant & Stratton College
- Profession: Businessman; politician

Cuno Hugo Rudolph (January 26, 1860 – January 6, 1932) was an American politician who served as the 10th and 14th president of the Board of Commissioners of the District of Columbia from 1910 to 1913 and again from 1921 to 1926. He was the only person to hold this office for two non-consecutive periods.

== Early life ==
Rudolph, the son of Jacob and Elizabeth Yerger Rudolph, was born in Baltimore, Maryland, in 1860 where he attended private schools and business colleges. He moved to Washington, D.C. in 1899 and become engaged in the hardware business, and served as the president of the hardware firm Rudolph and West until 1906. Rudolph married Amy Edna Merz (1868–1951) on June 8, 1901, and the couple had no children.

Rudolph expanded his business into bricks and banking and became active in politics as a Republican.

== Career ==
In 1901, as chairman of the Associated Charities' Public Playground Committee, he opened the first public playground in the District of Columbia, and he remained active in playgrounds in the District for years. He served on inaugural committees and led the George Washington Bicentennial efforts in DC until poor health forced him to resign. He was on the board of trustees at Howard University, served as chairman of the Board of the Children's Hospital and organized the first Mother's Day celebration in DC in 1911. He was a vice president of the Washington D.C. Board of Trade, and was the director of the Washington D.C., Chamber of Commerce.

He was first appointed to the District of Columbia Board of Commissioners in 1910 by President Howard Taft and quickly elected the Board's president, a role he filled until he resigned in March 1913 when President Woodrow Wilson was inaugurated. He then back to banking, service as vice-president of the Second National Bank of Washington until President Harding again appointed him to the Board of Commissioners, and again elected its president. He was reappointed by President Coolidge and continued to serve until 1926 when he resigned again due to poor health.

== Death and honors ==
Rudolph died in 1932, at his home in the Dresden Apartments on Connecticut Avenue. After a service in DC, he was buried at Lorraine Park Cemetery in Baltimore.

The Cuno H. Rudolph Elementary School building, now home to Washington Latin Public Charter School, was named in his honor in 1940.

Political offices
Preceded by Henry Brown Floyd MacFarland	President of the D.C. Board of Commissioners; 1910-1913	Succeeded by Henry Brown Floyd MacFarland

Political offices
Preceded by John Thilman Hendrick	President of the D.C. Board of Commissioners; 1921-1926	Succeeded by Proctor L. Dougherty
