= Thomas Corcoran (mayor) =

Mayor of Georgetown, District of Columbia, United States

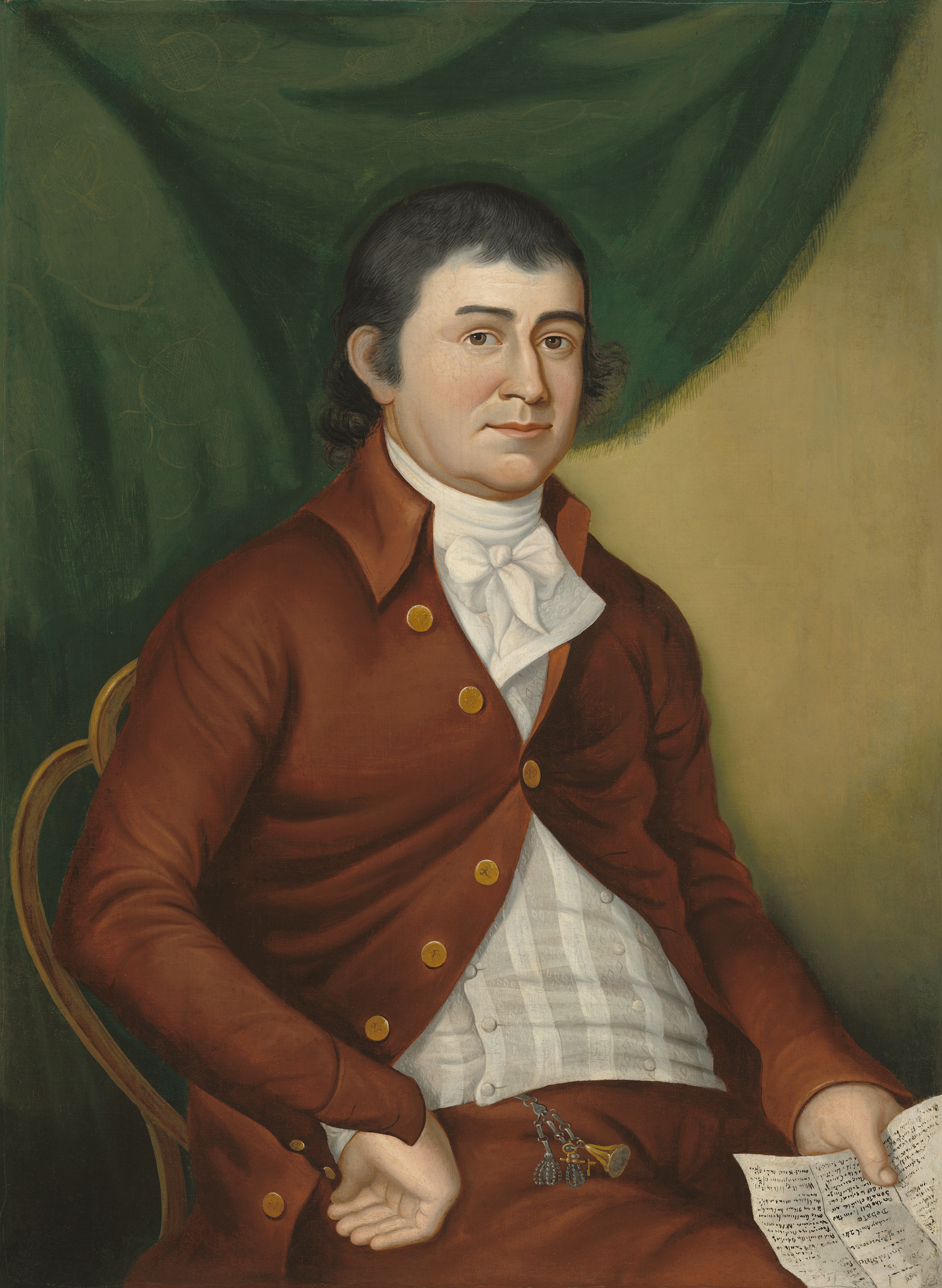
- Charles Peale Polk, Thomas Corcoran, c. 1802-1810, in the National Gallery of Art
- Born: 1754; County Limerick, Kingdom of Ireland
- Died: January 27, 1830 (aged 76); Georgetown, District of Columbia, U.S.
- Resting place: Oak Hill Cemetery; Washington, D.C., U.S.
- Occupations: Merchant, real estate developer
- Known for: Mayor of Georgetown

Thomas Corcoran Jr. (1754 - January 27, 1830) was an Irish American merchant who served as mayor of the town of Georgetown, District of Columbia and 22 terms on the Georgetown Common Council. He also held several appointed positions with the state of Maryland and the District of Columbia. He was one of Georgetown's and Washington's first philanthropists, and the father of banker and philanthropist William Wilson Corcoran.

== Life and career ==
=== Early life in Ireland and Maryland ===
Thomas Corcoran Jr. was born in 1754 (the exact date is not known) to Thomas and Elizabeth (née Wilson) Corcoran in County Limerick in the Kingdom of Ireland. Thomas Sr. had emigrated to Ireland from London, and the Corcorans were a merchant family. Thomas' uncle, William Wilson, emigrated in 1769 to the city of Baltimore in the Province of Maryland in North America. Thomas Jr. emigrated to the Baltimore himself in 1783, where he took a position as a clerk in his uncle's import and export business. Over the next few years, William Wilson became one of the biggest importers in Maryland. Between 1783 and 1788, Thomas made three business trips aboard his uncle's merchant vessels, traveling twice to the city of Cork in Ireland and once to Amsterdam in the Netherlands.

Corcoran married Hannah Lemmon of Baltimore in 1788. That year, he traveled south with the intent of settling in Richmond, Virginia. Corcoran's first stop, however, was the village of Georgetown on the northern shore of the Potomac River in southern Maryland. Impressed with the large number of ocean-going vessels docked at the port of Georgetown, Corcoran decided to forgo his trip to Richmond and settle in Georgetown. He brought his wife and children to Georgetown in late 1788, and rented a house on Congress Street (now 31st Street NW) from which he operated a shoemaker's shop and leather goods business. He swiftly grew wealthy supplying shoes for the faculty and students at nearby Georgetown College. Corcoran also began buying tobacco and flax seed for export on his uncle's ships. He built a three-story brick home at 122 Bridge Street (now M Street NW) and moved into it in 1791.

Corcoran became one of Georgetown's, and the District of Columbia's, wealthiest citizens in time. He later became a director of the Bank of Columbia and was a member of the board of trustees of Columbia College. He moved out of the leather and shoe business and into banking and real estate, where his fortune was made.

=== Georgetown Common Council and mayor ===
Corcoran's position in the community made him a leading political figure as well. Georgetown was incorporated by the Maryland General Assembly on December 25, 1789. The town's charter provided for a mayor, recorder, several aldermen, and a "common council" of 10 people. The first recorded meeting of the common council was on November 28, 1791. Corcoran was elected 22 times to the Georgetown Common Council. He was first elected Mayor of Georgetown in 1795 for a one-year term beginning January 7, 1805. His predecessor was Daniel Reintzel, a successful real estate developer under whom Georgetown had rapidly prospered. Corcoran served but a single term initially, being replaced in 1806 by Reintzell. Corcoran was again elected town mayor for terms beginning in January 1808, January 1809, and January 1810. David Wiley succeeded him for a single term, and Corcoran served his last term as mayor of Georgetown in 1812. After the Burning of Washington on August 24, 1814, during the War of 1812, some members of Congress wished to move the nation's capital away from the District of Columbia. Corcoran swiftly offered Congress and the executive branch the use of Georgetown College while the White House and United States Capitol were being rebuilt.

The Thirteen Colonies declared their independence from Great Britain in July 1776 and achieved it with the Treaty of Paris in 1783 (which ended the American Revolutionary War). With ratification of the United States Constitution in 1788, a new national capital needed to be chosen. On July 9, 1790, Congress passed the Residence Act, which approved the creation of a national capital on the Potomac River. The exact location was to be selected by President George Washington, who chose a portion of the states of Maryland and Virginia on January 24, 1791. The Maryland land was already owned by David Burnes, Daniel Carroll, Samuel Davidson, Robert Peter, and Notley Young (later known as the "original patentees"), and Washington needed to negotiate with them for the purchase of their property. He traveled to Georgetown for a meeting with the original patentees in March 1791. Washington was greeted at the village's entrance by Corcoran and a group of 50 men on horseback. Corcoran delivered a speech and expressed the group's support for Washington's endeavors.

=== Maryland and federal appointments ===
Until December 1, 1800, citizens of the District of Columbia were able to vote in federal, state, and local elections in both Maryland and Virginia. In 1794, Maryland Governor Thomas Sim Lee appointed Corcoran adjutant of the 18th Regiment of the Maryland militia. Governor Benjamin Ogle promoted him to captain in 1799.

President Thomas Jefferson appointed Corcoran a member of the Levy Court of the District of Columbia in 1801. This body, which had the authority of a county commission, helped administer the part of the District of Columbia not included in the City of Washington or the town of Georgetown, though it also had some authority within the cities. Corcoran was reappointed to the position by President James Madison in 1809, President James Monroe in 1817, President John Quincy Adams in 1825, and President Andrew Jackson in 1829. He was still a member of the Levy Court at the time of his death. His reputation also won Corcoran a seat on the first grand jury ever to sit in the District of Columbia (in 1801).

President Madison appointed Corcoran Postmaster of Georgetown in 1815. Corcoran held the lucrative position until his death.

== Personal life and death ==
Corcoran was a lifelong member of the Episcopal church, and was a vestryman at St. John's Episcopal Church of Georgetown. Corcoran was a noted philanthropist and gave substantial sums of money to Columbian College, Christ Church of Georgetown, Holy Trinity Catholic Church, and St. John's Episcopal Church of Georgetown. He also gave liberally to create and endow Catholic cemeteries in Georgetown and its surrounding areas.

Nothing is known about Thomas Corcoran's first wife, other than she died and they had no children. It is not known if he married in Ireland or America when he married, how long the marriage lasted, what her name was, how old she was, or what she died from.

Thomas and Hanna Corcoran had 12 children (six boys and six girls), six of whom survived to maturity: James, Eliza, Thomas Jr., Sarah, William, and Ellen. His youngest son, William Wilson Corcoran, became one of the richest men in the District of Columbia through his banking activities and founded Oak Hill Cemetery and the Corcoran Gallery of Art.

Thomas Corcoran died of unspecified causes at his home in Georgetown on January 27, 1830. It is not clear where he was initially buried, although cemetery and burial scholar Wesley Pippenger believes it likely that he was buried at the Presbyterian Burying Ground in Georgetown. However, William Wilson Corcoran had his father's and mother's remains disinterred and reburied at Oak Hill Cemetery sometime after 1850. They were interred beneath a Romanesque Revival grey granite pillar near the Corcoran Mausoleum.

Corcoran is one of two mayors of Georgetown to have a D.C. public school named after him. The Corcoran School, opened in 1889, closed in 1951. It then spent 30 years as administrative space before being sold to the Hotel and Restaurant Workers Union, which used it for more than 20 years.

== Bibliography ==
- Benedetto, Robert; Donovan, Jane; Du Vall, Kathleen (2003). Historical Dictionary of Washington, D.C.. Lanham, Md.: Scarecrow Press. ISBN 0810840944.
- Commissioners of the District of Columbia (1913). Annual Report of the Commissioners of the District of Columbia - Year Ended June 30, 1911. Volume IV: Report of the Board of Education. Washington, D.C.: Government Printing Office.
- Corcoran, William Wilson (1879). A Grandfather's Legacy: Containing a Sketch of His Life and Obituary Notices of Some Members of His Family, Together With Letters From His Friends. Washington, D.C.: H. Polkinhorn, Printer. p. 4. "Thomas Corcoran Limerick Elizabeth Wilson."
- Evelyn, Douglas; Dickson, Paul; Ackerman, S.J. (2008). On This Spot: Pinpointing the Past in Washington, D.C. Sterling, Va.: Capital Books. ISBN 9781933102702.
- Hall, Henry (1895). America's Successful Men of Affairs: An Encyclopedia of Contemporaneous Biography. New York: New York Tribune. p. 197. "Thomas Corcoran first wife died Baltimore."
- Holloway, Laura C. (1885). Famous American Fortunes and the Men Who Have Made Them. Philadelphia: Garretson.
- Joint Select Committee to Investigate the Charities and Reformatory Institutions in the District of Columbia (1898). Supplemental Report. Part III-Historical Sketches of the Charities and Reformatory Institutions in the District of Columbia. 55th Cong., 2d sess. Washington, D.C.: Government Printing Office.
- Pippenger, Wesley E. (2004). Dead People On the Move!. Westminster, Md.: Willow Bend Books. ISBN 0788431943.
- Simmons, Linda Crocker (1981). Charles Peale Polk, 1776-1822: A Limner and His Likenesses. Washington, D.C.: Corcoran Gallery of Art.
- Taggart, Hugh T. (1908). "Old Georgetown". Records of the Columbia Historical Society: 120–224.
- Tindall, William (1922). "The Executives and Voters of Georgetown, District of Columbia". Records of the Columbia Historical Society. The Society: 89–117. "Daniel Reintzel Georgetown."
- Tindall, William (1909). Origin and Government of the District of Columbia. Washington, D.C.: Government Printing Office.
- Wallis, Severn Teackle (July 1872). "Discourse on the Life and Character of George Peabody". The Southern Review: 157–189.
- Warner, William W. (1994). At Peace With All Their Neighbors: Catholics and Catholicism in the National Capital, 1787-1860. Washington, D.C.: Georgetown University Press. ISBN 0878405577.
