= Louis Brownlow =

American politician and political consultant (1879–1963)

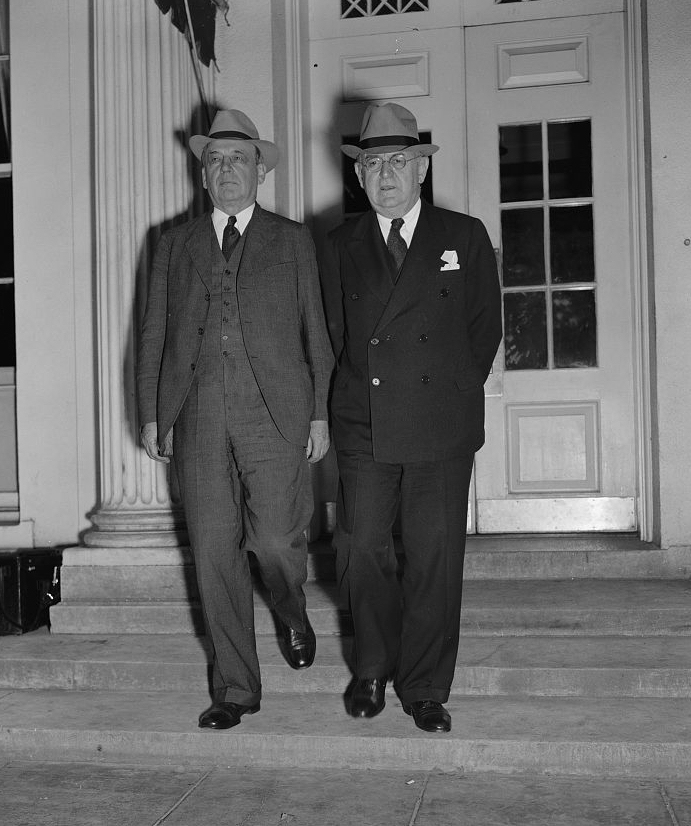
- Charles Merriam (left) and Louis Brownlow at the White House in 1938

12th President of the Board of Commissioners of Washington, D.C.
- In office October 9, 1917 – September 17, 1920
- President: Woodrow Wilson
- Preceded by: Oliver Peck Newman
- Succeeded by: John Thilman Hendrick

Member of the Board of Commissioners of Washington, D.C.
- In office January 26, 1915 – September 17, 1920
- President: Woodrow Wilson
- Preceded by: Frederick Lincoln Siddons
- Succeeded by: John Thilman Hendrick

Personal details
- Born: August 29, 1879 Buffalo, Missouri, U.S.
- Died: September 27, 1963 (aged 84) Washington, D.C., U.S.
- Resting place: Rock Creek Cemetery; Washington, D.C., U.S.
- Occupation: Political scientist

Louis Brownlow (August 29, 1879 – September 27, 1963) was an American author, political scientist, and consultant in the area of public administration. As chairman of the Committee on Administrative Management (better known as the Brownlow Committee) in 1937, he co-authored a report which led to passage of the Reorganization Act of 1939 and the creation of the Executive Office of the President. While chairing the Committee on Administrative Management, Brownlow called several of President Franklin D. Roosevelt's advisors men with "a passion for anonymity"—which later became a popular phrase.

== Early life and career ==
Louis Brownlow was born in Buffalo, Missouri, in August 1879. His parents were Robert Sims and Ruth Amis Brownlow. His father had been a soldier in the Confederate States Army, serving in the Tennessee, Missouri, and Arkansas area, and had been wounded in the hip by a minié ball. His parents, each of whom had taught school at some time, moved from Giles County, Tennessee, to Missouri some time between 1877 and 1879 after Robert Brownlow was appointed postmaster for the town of Buffalo. Louis was frequently ill as a child and educated at home He was unable to attend college due to his family's poverty, but read books extensively.

In 1900, Brownlow was hired by the Nashville Banner, and over the next several years wrote for the Louisville Courier-Journal, Louisville Times, and several other newspapers in Tennessee as well. He also worked for the Haskin Syndicate as a political writer and later as a correspondent in Europe, the Middle East, and the Far East from 1906 to 1915. He ghost-wrote Haskin's 1911 book The American Government, which was an influential treatise on Progressive ideas about public administration.

He married the former Elizabeth Sims (daughter of Congressman Thetus W. Sims) in December 1909. The couple had no children. Brownlow was a member of the Democratic Party and a Methodist, and belonged to the Cosmos Club and National Press Club.

== Political and academic career ==
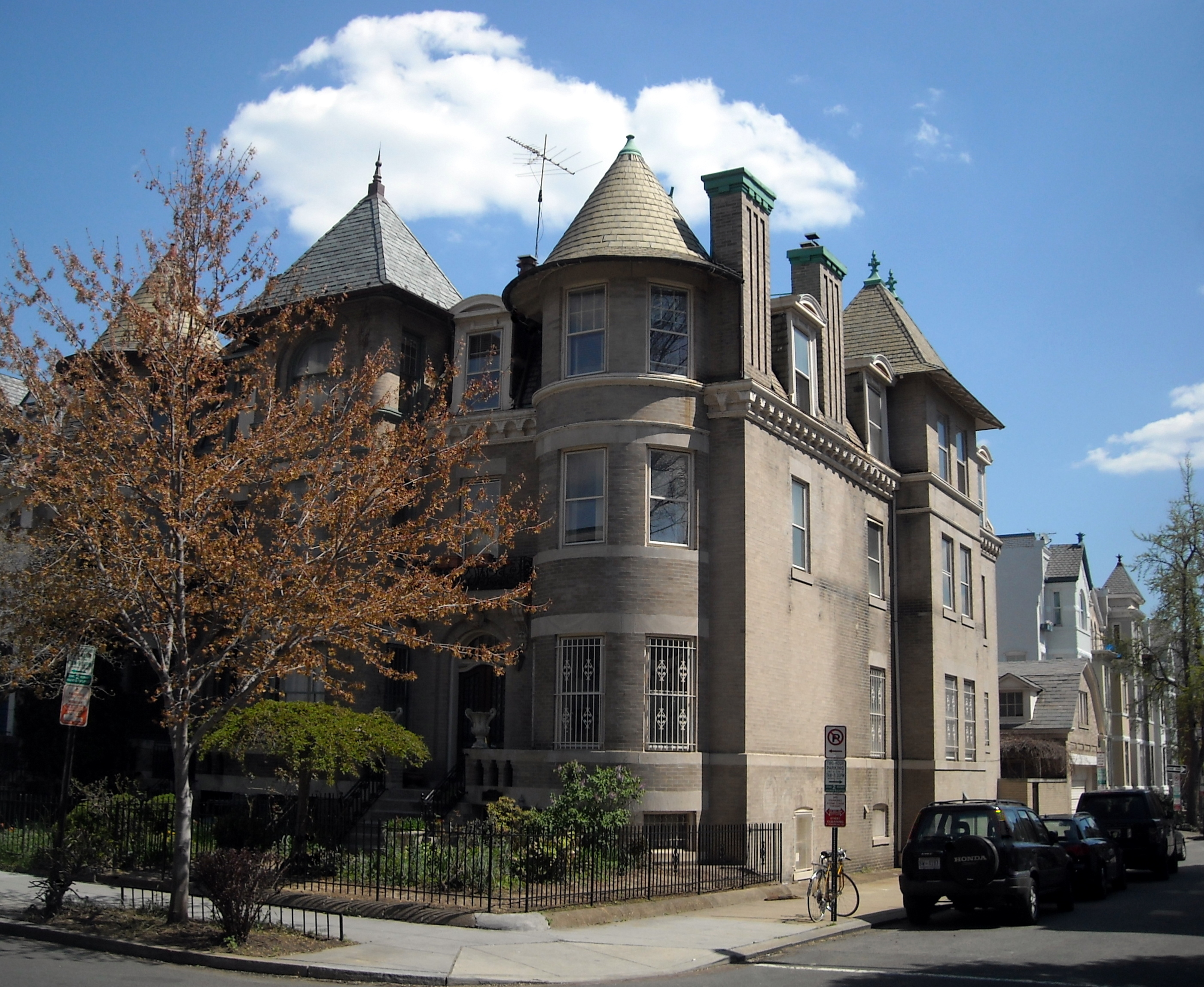
Brownlow's former residence in the Dupont Circle neighborhood of Washington, D.C.

Brownlow came to Washington, D.C., as a reporter for two Tennessee newspapers, and made the acquaintance of President Theodore Roosevelt. He caught the attention of President Woodrow Wilson in 1914 after being one of the few newspaper reporters to correctly predict that the German Empire would go to war with Serbia over the assassination of Archduke Franz Ferdinand (which caused the start of World War I). Expressing a desire to put into practice many of the administrative practices he had reported on from Europe, Brownlow sought and won from President Wilson appointment in 1915 as a commissioner of the District of Columbia, serving until 1920. From 1917 to 1920, he was president of the commissioners and a vocal proponent of home rule. During this period, the Metropolitan Police Department of the District of Columbia unionized, and Brownlow supported its unionization (although not its affiliation with the American Federation of Labor). He helped guide the city through the 1918 flu pandemic, closing schools and businesses and banning all public gatherings. He also served on the District of Columbia Public Utilities Commission and the District Zoning Commission from 1917 to 1919. He was City Manager of Petersburg, Virginia, from 1920 to 1923; City Manager of Knoxville, Tennessee, from 1924 to 1926; and City Manager of Radburn, New Jersey, from 1927 to 1931. He briefly worked for the United States Daily newspaper in 1927. He was a consultant to the City Housing Corporation in New York City from 1928 to 1931 and was elected a director of the corporation in 1931.

Brownlow began teaching political science at the University of Chicago in 1931, and later that year was appointed director of the Public Administration Clearing House (which he had helped organize in 1930) at the university. He remained the Clearing House's director until 1945. Brownlow became chairman of the Committee for Public Administration of the Social Science Research Council in 1933, where he worked to bridge the gap between academics and practitioners. He was also chairman of the National Institute of Public Affairs from 1934 to 1949.

=== Brownlow Committee ===
On March 22, 1936, Roosevelt established the Committee on Administrative Management (commonly known as the Brownlow Committee) and charged it with developing proposals for reorganizing the executive branch. The three-person committee consisted of Louis Brownlow, Charles Merriam, and Luther Gulick.

On January 10, 1937, the Committee released its report. Famously declaring "The President needs help," the Committee's report advocated a strong chief executive, including among its 37 recommendations significant expansion of the presidential staff, integration of managerial agencies into a single presidential office, expansion of the merit system, integration of all independent agencies into existing Cabinet departments, and modernization of federal accounting and financial practices. While he was a member of the Committee on Administrative Management, Brownlow was named an official delegate to the Sixth International Congress of Administrative Sciences in Warsaw, Poland. Although he left government service after the termination of the Committee, Brownlow continued to be an advisor to presidents Franklin Roosevelt and Harry S. Truman. He left that position in 1939.

Brownlow received an honorary Doctor of Law degree from American University in 1938. He suffered a heart attack in December of that year.

=== Post-Brownlow Committee ===
Brownlow helped co-found the American Society for Public Administration in 1940, serving in various executive and advisory capacities to it until 1945. Brownlow was also director of the Franklin D. Roosevelt Memorial Foundation in 1947, and director of the Woodrow Wilson Foundation from 1948 to 1953. He retired from the University of Chicago in 1949 and served as a visiting professor at the University of Washington in 1957 and the Maxwell School of Citizenship and Public Affairs at Syracuse in 1958 and 1959.

== Death ==
Louis Brownlow died in Arlington, Virginia, in September 1963 after delivering a speech at the Army Navy Country Club. The cause of death was a heart attack. A memorial service was held at St. Thomas Episcopal Church.

== Honors named for Brownlow ==
Since 1968, the National Academy of Public Administration has recognized outstanding contributions to the literature of public administration through presentation of the Louis Brownlow Book Award. The award is given to a book published in the previous two years which has made an exceptional contribution to the study of governmental institutions or public administration problems.

The American Society for Public Administration also bestows its Louis Brownlow Award on the best article written by a public administrator to appear in the journal Public Administration Review in the past year.

== Publications ==
- The President and the Presidency. Chicago: Public Administration Service, 1949.
- A Passion for Politics: The Autobiography of Louis Brownlow: First Half. Chicago: University of Chicago Press, 1955.
- A Passion for Anonymity: The Autobiography of Louis Brownlow: Second Half. Chicago: University of Chicago Press, 1958.
- The Anatomy of the Anecdote. Chicago: University of Chicago Press, 1960.

== Bibliography ==
- "Agency Aims to Aid All Governments." New York Times. December 28, 1930.
- "ASPA's Awards Program." American Society for Public Administration. No date. Accessed 2010-04-25.
- Bruce, Philip Alexander; Tyler, Lyon Gardiner; and Morton, Richard Lee. History of Virginia. New York: American Historical Society, 1924.
- Calabresi, Steven G., and Yoo, Christopher S. The Unitary Executive: Presidential Power From Washington to Bush. New Haven, Conn.: Yale University Press, 2008.
- Catledge, Turner. "Capitol Startled." New York Times. January 13, 1937.
- Chiorazzi, Michael and Most, Marguerite. Prestatehood Legal Materials: A Fifty-State Research Guide, Including New York City and the District of Columbia. Florence, Ky.: Routledge, 2006.
- Crew, Harvey W.; Webb, William Bensing; and Wooldridge, John. Centennial History of the City of Washington, D.C. Dayton, Ohio: United Brethren Publishing House, 1892.
- "Deaths." International Institute of Administrative Sciences. 29:4 (1963).
- Dickinson, Matthew J. Bitter Harvest: FDR, Presidential Power, and the Growth of the Presidential Branch. New York: Cambridge University Press, 1999.
- "Elects Louis Brownlow." New York Times. March 19, 1931.
- Felbinger, Claire L., and Haynes, Wendy A. Outstanding Women in Public Administration: Leaders, Mentors, and Pioneers. Armonk, N.Y.: M.E. Sharpe, 2004.
- Karl, Barry Dean. Executive Reorganization and Reform in the New Deal: The Genesis of Administrative Management, 1900–1939. Cambridge, Mass.: Harvard University Press, 1963.
- Karl, Barry D. "Louis Brownlow." Public Administration Review. 39:6 (November–December 1979).
- "Louis Brownlow." Washington Post. September 30, 1963.
- "The Louis Brownlow Book Award: 2009 Nominations." National Academy of Public Administration. No date. Accessed 2010-04-25.
- "Louis Brownlow, Ex-Commissioner of D.C., Dies at 84." Washington Post. September 28, 1963.
- Maisel, L. Sandy. The Parties Respond: Changes in American Parties and Campaigns. Boulder, Colo.: Westview Press, 2002.
- Mosher, Frederick C. American Public Administration: Past, Present, Future. 2d ed. Birmingham, Ala.: University of Alabama Press, 1975.
- "Obituary." Washington Post. September 29, 1963.
- Persico, Joseph E. "The Great Swine Flu Epidemic of 1918." American Heritage. March 1976.
- "Police Unions in Thirty-Seven Cities." New York Times. September 14, 1919.
- "President Orders Own Survey to Cut New Deal Activity." New York Times. March 23, 1936.
- Relyea, Harold C. The Executive Office of the President: A Historical, Biographical, and Bibliographical Guide. Westport, Conn.: Greenwood Press, 1997.
- Relyea, Harold C. The Executive Office of the President: An Historical Overview. Report 98-606 GOV. Washington, D.C.: Congressional Research Service, November 26, 2008. Accessed 2010-04-25.
- "Roosevelt Memorial Set." New York Times. March 31, 1947.
- Rudalevige, Andrew. The New Imperial Presidency: Renewing Presidential Power After Watergate. Ann Arbor, Mich.: University of Michigan Press, 2005.
- Rudolph, Lloyd I., and Rudolph, Susanne Hoeber. Making U.S. Foreign Policy Toward South Asia: Regional Imperatives and the Imperial Presidency. New Delhi: Concept Pub. Co., 2008.
- Safire, William. Safire's Political Dictionary. New York: Oxford University Press, 2008.
- Shafritz, Jay M. "The Brownlow Committee." In The Dictionary of Public Policy and Administration. Jay M. Shafritz, ed. Boulder, Colo.: Westview Press, 2004.
- Sims, Almon James. The Pariss Sims Family and Related Families, 1765–1965. Knoxville, Tenn.: A.J. Sims, 1965.
- Stillman, Richard Joseph. The Rise of the City Manager: A Public Professional in Local Government. Albuquerque: University of New Mexico Press, 1974.
- Sundquist, James L. The Decline and Resurgence of Congress. Washington, D.C.: Brookings Institution, 1981.
- "Syracuse Professor Named." New York Times. February 16, 1958.
- "Thetus W. Sims, 87, Long in Congress." New York Times. December 18, 1939.
- Trahair, R.C.S. From Aristotelian to Reaganomics: A Dictionary of Eponyms With Biographies in the Social Science. Westport, Conn.: Greenwood Press, 1994.
- U.S. President's Committee on Administrative Management. Report of the President's Committee. Washington, D.C.: Government Printing Office, 1937.
