= Columbian Institute for the Promotion of Arts and Sciences =

American learned society, 1816–1837

- Formation: June 28, 1816
- Dissolved: 1837
- Purpose: Promotion of arts and sciences
- Headquarters: Washington, D.C., U.S.
- Founder: Dr. Edward Cutbush
- Main organ: Congress

The Columbian Institute for the Promotion of Arts and Sciences (1816–1838) was a literary and science institution in Washington, D.C., founded by Dr. Edward Cutbush (1772–1843), a naval surgeon. Thomas Law had earlier suggested of such a society "at the seat of government." It was the first "learned society" established in Washington and was organized on June 28, 1816, sixteen years after the city was occupied, and less than two years after the invasion by the British troops. The second article of its constitution states: "The Institute shall consist of mathematical, physical, moral and political sciences, general literature and fine arts."

== Members ==
The honorary members included three presidents who were still alive during the 1820s; John Adams, Thomas Jefferson and James Madison as well as Marquis Lafayette and Baron Cuvier, however, John Quincy Adams and Andrew Jackson were both resident members.

The membership of the institute included many prominent men of the day, including representatives of the military, government service, medical, law and other professions. At least 11 of the men held the office of Mayor of Washington:

- John Quincy Adams (1767–1848), Resident member - Sixth president of the United States.
- Joseph Anderson (1757–1837), First Comptroller of the United States Treasury.
- James Barbour (1775–1842), 18th Governor of Virginia, Served as Secretary of War.
- William T. Barry (1784–1835), Kentucky House of Representatives, Served as Postmaster General.
- Simon Bernard (1779–1839), French General of Engineers, U.S. Army Chief of Engineers.
- John M. Berrien (1781–1856), Georgia Senator, Served as Attorney General.
- Rev. Andrew Bigelow (1795–1877), Minister, Brother-in-law of Abbott Lawrence and brother of John P. Bigelow.
- James H. Blake MD (1763–1819), Practicing Physician, 3rd mayor of Washington, D.C.
- Benjamin S. Bohrer MD (1788–1862), Physician.
- George Bomford (1780–1848), Col., Chief of the Ordnance Bureau.
- Phineas Bradley (1769–1845), Assistant Postmaster General, Banker.
- William A. Bradley (1794–1867), Banker, Former mayor of Washington, D.C.
- Robert Brent (1763–1819), Banker, Judge of Orphans' Court, First mayor of Washington, D.C.
- William Brent (1784–1848), U.S. Reprepresentative for Louisiana.
- John A. Brereton MD (1787–1839), Physician, U.S. Navy and then U.S. Army.
- Rev. Obadiah B. Brown (1779–1852), Minister.
- Charles Bulfinch (1763–1844), Architect, designed the U.S. Capitol Building.
- Elias B. Caldwell (1776–1825), Clerk of the Supreme Court.
- John C. Calhoun (1782–1850), Secretary of War, Seventh vice president of the United States.
- Rev. John N. Campbell (1798–1864), Minister.
- Thomas Carbery (1791–1863), 6th mayor of Washington, D.C.
- Overton Carr Jr. (d.1838), Banker, Doorkeeper of the U.S. House of Representatives.
- Daniel Carroll (banker) (1764–1849), Banker from Duddington, merchant and planter, largest land holder in the federal district, over 1,400 acres including site of U.S. Capitol building.
- William T. Carroll (1802–1863), Law Professor, Clerk of the Supreme Court, Father of Samuel S. Carroll.
- Nathaniel P. Causin MD (1781–1849), Physician, Judge of the Orphans' Court.
- Rev. Irah Chase (1793–1864), Minister, Theology Professor.
- Matthew St. Clair Clarke (1790–1852), Clerk of the United States House of Representatives.
- Henry Clay (1777–1852), Served as Secretary of State from 1825 to 1829.
- John Coyle Jr. (d.1838), Secretary of the Howard Society, Washington City Common Council member.
- William Cranch (1769–1855), Chief Justice of the Circuit Court.
- William H. Crawford (1772–1834), Served as Secretary of War and Treasury, Candidate for president in 1824.
- Edward Cutbush, MD (1772–1843), Naval surgeon and founder of the Columbian Institution and Geneva Medical College.
- Nathaniel Cutting (d.1824), Merchant, diplomat and public official.
- Asbury Dickins (1780–1861), Chief Clerk of the Treasury Department and Secretary of the United States Senate. Served as Secretary of the institute from 1818 to 1838.
- Mahlon Dickerson (1770–1853), Governor of New Jersey, Served as Secretary of the Navy.
- Jonathan Elliot (historian) (1784–1846), Writer, publisher or editor.
- Samuel Elliot Jr. (), Vice president of the Washington Botanical Society.
- William Elliot (1773–1838), Clerk in the Patent Office.
- Philip Richard Fendall (1794–1868), Banker, lawyer and editor.
- Peter Force (1790–1868), Publisher, Former mayor of Washington, D.C.
- Joseph Gales Jr. (1786–1860), Journalist, Former mayor of Washington, D.C.
- George Gibson (1775–1861), Commissary general in U.S. Army.
- James S. Gunnell MD (1788–1852), Physician, Dentist.
- Rev. Ralph Randolph Gurley (1797–1872), Minister - Chaplain of the United States House of Representatives for the 21st and 22nd Congresses and again for the 30th and 31st
- George Hadfield (1763–1826), Architect, worked on the design of the U.S. Capitol building.
- Benjamin Hallowell (1799–1877), Educator.
- Col. Archibald Henderson (1783–1859), Commandant of the Marine Corps, serving from 1820 to 1859, later in Washington Monument Society.
- William Hewitt (d.1839), Register of Washington.
- James Hoban (1758–1831), Irish Architect, designed the White House.
- Benjamin Homans (d.1823), Chief Clerk of the Navy Department.
- Rev. Dr. Andrew Hunter (1750–1823), Minister, Continental Army and U.S. Navy chaplain.
- Henry Huntt MD (1782–1838), First Health Officer of Washington.
- Samuel D. Ingham (1779–1860), Pennsylvania House of Representatives, Served as Secretary of Treasury.
- George E. Ironside (d.1827), Educator.
- Andrew Jackson (1767–1845), Resident member - Seventh president of the United States.
- Thomas P. Jones (1774–1848), Superintendent and examiner of the United States Patent and Trademark Office.
- Walter Jones (congressman) (1745–1815), District Attorney and Major General of the District Militia.
- Robert King (1775–1831), City of Washington, D.C., Surveyor.
- Samuel L. Knapp (1783–1838), Writer, publisher or editor.
- William Lambert (writer) (d.1834), Congressional clerk, engrosser of the Bill of Rights, Clerk of the Pension Office.
- Samuel Lane (d.1822), Col., Commissioner of Public Buildings.
- Benjamin Henry Latrobe (1764–1820), Architect - Designed the United States Capitol.
- Rev. James Laurie (1778–1853), Minister, First President of the Washington Botanical Society.
- Edmund Law (1790–1829), Washington City Common Council member, Son of Thomas Law.
- John Law (d.1822), Lawyer, Son of Thomas Law.
- Thomas Law (1756–1834), Judge and beneficent Magistrate, district of Bahar, India.
- Benjamin L. Lear (1791–1832), Lawyer, Son of Tobias Lear.
- Tobias Lear (1762–1816), Private Secretary of George Washington.
- Richard Bland Lee (1761–1827), Judge of the Orphans' Court.
- Robert Little (Reverend) (1762–1827), Unitarian minister, Founder and pastor; First Unitarian Church in Washington.
- Joseph Lovell (1788–1836), Surgeon General U.S. Army.
- Alexander Macomb (American general) (1782–1841), General in U.S. Army.
- Frederick May MD (1773–1847), Physician.
- George W. May MD (1789–1845), Physician, Brother of Dr. Frederick May.
- Rev. William Matthews (1770–1854), Minister, Founder of St. Vincent's Orphan Asylum.
- John McClelland (1774–1845), Washington Monument Society.
- John McLean (1785–1861), Served as Postmaster General, Justice U.S. Supreme Court.
- Alexander McWilliams MD (1775–1850), Physician, Surgeon in Navy.
- Joseph Mechlin (), unknown.
- Josiah Meigs (1757–1822), Surveyor-general of the United States, one of original founders and trustees of Columbian College (now George Washington University).
- Robert Mills (architect) (1781–1855), Architect, designed the Washington Monument.
- Thomas Munroe (1771–1852), Postmaster.
- William Noland (1775–1855), Major in Virginia militia, Commissioner of Public Buildings.
- Rev. Isaac Orr (d.1844), Minister, Half-brother of Benjamin Orr.
- Joel R. Poinsett (1779–1851), Served as Secretary of War.
- William Prout (1753–1823), City Hall Erection Committee.
- Richard Randall MD (1796–1829), Physician.
- Daniel Rapine (1768–1826), Publisher, 2nd Mayor of Washington, DC.
- Isaac Roberdeau (1763–1829), Major, Surveyor in L'Enfant's Corps, Son of Daniel Roberdeau.
- John Rodgers (naval officer, War of 1812) (1772–1838), Commodore U.S. Navy.
- Richard Rush (1780–1859), Attorney General and Secretary of Treasury, Son of Benjamin Rush who signed Declaration of Independence.
- Rudolph Schaer (), Educator.
- William Winston Seaton (1785–1866), Publisher, Former mayor of Washington, D.C.
- Thomas Sewall MD (1786–1845), Physician.
- John T. Shaaff MD (1763–1819), Physician.
- Thomas Sim MD (1770–1832), Physician.
- Samuel L. Southard (1787–1842), Served as Secretary of the Navy, 10th Governor of New Jersey.
- Rev. Dr. William Staughton (1770–1829), Chaplain of the United States Senate, Minister, First President of Columbian College.
- John Stretch (), Director of the Washington Library Company.
- Col. William Tatham (soldier) (1752–1819), Possessor of important scientific library.
- Pishey Thompson (1784–1862), Writer, publisher or editor.
- William Thornton MD (1759–1828), Commissioner of Patents, Physician, Architect - designed the U.S. Capitol.
- Thomas Tingey (1750–1829), Commodore U.S. Navy, Washington Naval Yard.
- Nathan Towson (1784–1854), U.S. Army, Major-General, Paymaster General.
- John M. Thomas MD (1805–1853), Physician.
- Buckner Thruston (1764–1845), U.S. Federal Judge.
- Thomas L. Thruston (), Librarian of the Department of State, Son of Buckner Thruston.
- John Underwood (), Civilian, unknown.
- John Peter Van Ness (1770–1846), Banker, General of the District Militia, Former mayor of Washington, D.C.
- Richard Wallach (1816–1881), Former mayor of Washington, D.C. (first Republican).
- Bailey Washington MD (1787–1854), Physician, American Naval Officer.
- Tobias Watkins MD (1780–1855), Fourth Auditor of the United States Treasury, writer, editor, and physician
- George Watterston (1783–1854), Writer, Librarian of the Library of Congress, a member of the city councils and trustee of the public schools.
- Roger C. Weightman (1787–1876), Former mayor of Washington, D.C.
- Charles Wilkes (1798–1877), American Naval Officer and Explorer.
- Timothy Winn (1773–1836), U.S. Navy purser, One of the incorporators of the Navy Yard Bridge Company.
- William Wirt (Attorney General) (1772–1834), Author, Served as Attorney General.
- Nicholas W. Worthington MD (1789–1849), Physician.
