= USS Patterson =

Three ships in the United States Navy have been named USS Patterson after Daniel Patterson.

- The first USS Patterson (DD-36) was a Paulding-class destroyer launched in 1910 and served in World War I. She served in the United States Coast Guard from 1924 to 1930. She was sold in 1934.
- The second USS Patterson (DD-392) was a Bagley-class destroyer launched in 1937 which served in World War II and was decommissioned in 1945.
- The third USS Patterson (FF-1061) was a Knox-class frigate launched in 1969 and decommissioned in 1991.

There was possibly a USS Patterson before 1910. An 8 February 1898 Evening Star, Washington, DC, newspaper article stated that US Navy Lieutenant Commander Charles T. Forse took command of Patterson from Lieutenant Commander E. K. Moore, who had commanded Patterson for the previous three years. Patterson was detailed, along with Gedney, to survey the mouth of the Yukon River in the Territory of Alaska. On 14 December 1910 US (US Navy) steamer Patterson was in a collision with Arctic at the wharf of United Engineering Works, Alameda, California.
