= Lewis Wood =

Lewis Wood may refer to:

- Lewis N. Wood (1799–1868), member of the Wisconsin State Assembly
- Lewis Pinhorn Wood (1848–1918), British landscapist and watercolourist
