= Robert Little =

Robert Little may refer to:

- Robert Little (journalist), American journalist for the Baltimore Sun
- Robert Little (minister) (1762–1827), English-American Unitarian minister
- Robert A. Little (1895–1918), Australian pilot
- Rob Little (born 1972), American stand-up comedian and actor
- Robert Little (architect) (1919–2005), modernist architect in Cleveland, Ohio
- Robert Wentworth Little (1840–1878), Freemason
- Robert Little (Flying Tiger) (died 1942), World War II double flying ace
- Robert McEwen Little (1860–1905), government administrator in North Borneo

== See also ==
- Robert Littell (disambiguation)
