= Robert Littell =

Robert Littell is the name of:

- Robert E. Littell (1936–2014), New Jersey politician
- Robert Littell (author) (born 1935), American writer

== See also ==
- Robert Little (disambiguation)
