= William Brent Jr. =

American politician

United States Chargé d'Affaires, Argentina
- In office June 14, 1844 – July 7, 1846

Member of the Virginia House of Delegates from Stafford County
- In office December 4, 1809 – December 1, 1811 Serving with Peter V. Daniel, Charles Julian
- Preceded by: John Moncure
- Succeeded by: William H. Fitzhugh

Personal details
- Born: January 13, 1783 Stafford County, Virginia, U.S.
- Died: May 13, 1848 (aged 65)
- Parent: Robert Brent (father)
- Relatives: William Brent (uncle)
- Education: College of William and Mary

William Brent Jr. (January 13, 1783 – May 13, 1848) was an American lawyer, politician and diplomat from Stafford County, Virginia who served two terms in the Virginia House of Delegates and as the United States Chargé d'Affaires, Argentina from June 14, 1844, to July 7, 1846.

== Early and family life ==
He was born to the former Dorothy Leigh and her husband, Robert Brent, of a distinguished family in Stafford County, Virginia and who became the mayor of Washington, D.C. His uncle, Col. William Brent (1775-1848), served in Virginia's Fifth Convention during the American Revolutionary War, as well as several terms in the Virginia House of Delegates representing Stafford County, and later as secretary to President Thomas Jefferson and finally as clerk of the U.S. District Court in Washington, D.C. This William Brent received a private education suitable to his class, graduated from the College of William and Mary and married Mary Fenwick.

== Virginia planter and politician ==
Stafford County voters twice elected Brent as one of their (part-time) representatives in the Virginia House of Delegates between 1810 and 1811. In 1820 he owned slaves, and also in 1830.

== Diplomacy in Argentina ==
Brent was named as the United States Chargé d'Affaires for Argentina on June 14, 1844, and presented his credentials on November 15, 1844. Shortly after his arrival in Buenos Aires, France and England began their five-year blockade of the city. Brent attempted to mediate the conflict, but his efforts were unsuccessful and his own government did not support him.
