= USS Patterson (FF-1061) =

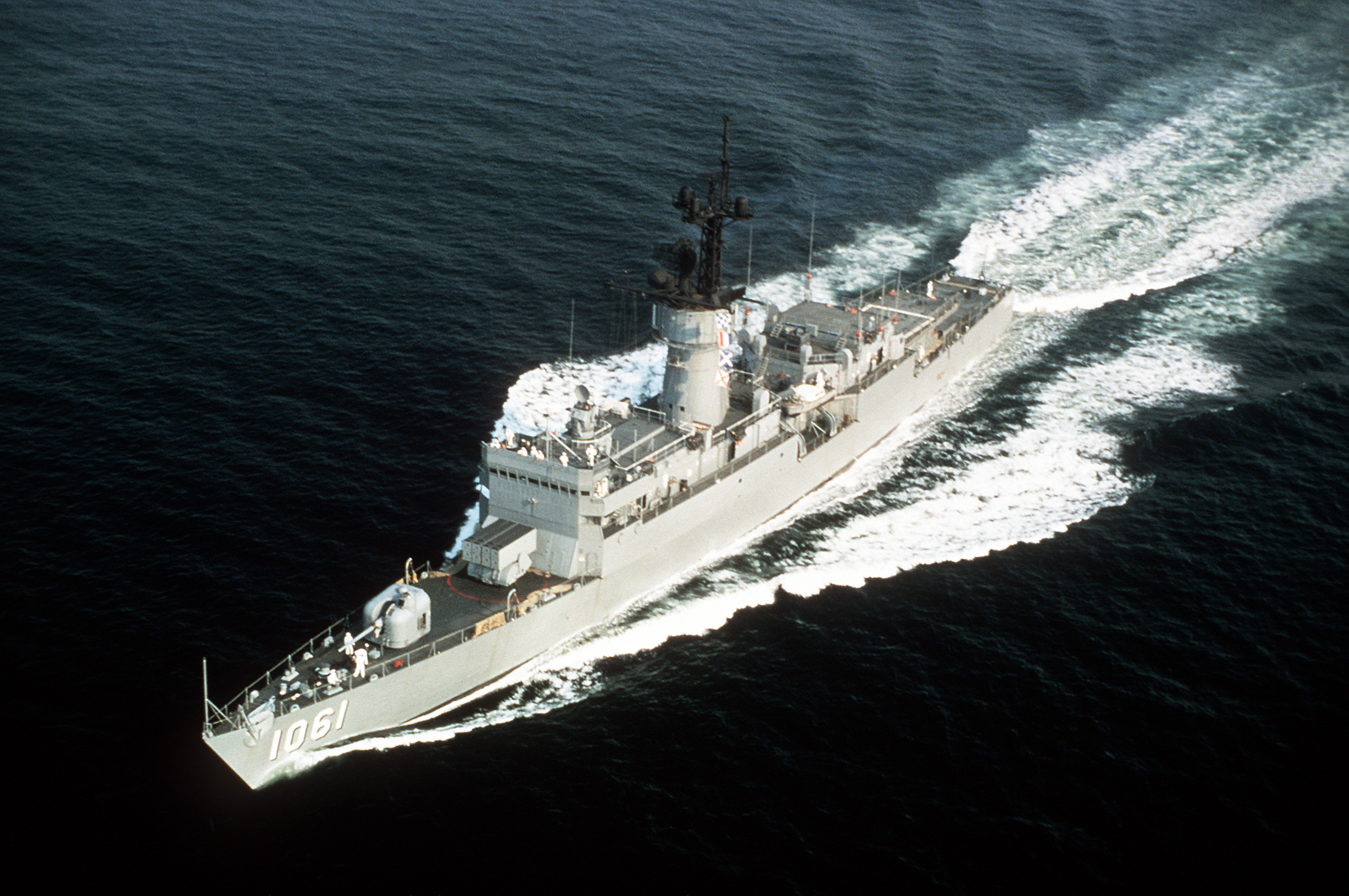
- USS Patterson (FF-1061) underway

History

United States
- Name: USS Patterson
- Namesake: Commodore Daniel Todd Patterson (1786-1839), U.S. Navy officer who served in the War of 1812
- Ordered: 22 July 1964
- Builder: Avondale Shipyard, Westwego, Louisiana
- Laid down: 12 October 1967
- Launched: 3 May 1969
- Acquired: 27 February 1970
- Commissioned: 14 March 1970
- Decommissioned: 30 September 1991
- Stricken: 11 January 1995
- Motto: Finest Frigate in the Fleet
- Fate: Sold for scrapping late September 1999

General characteristics
- Class & type: Knox-class frigate
- Displacement: 3,246 tons (4,227 full load)
- Length: 438 ft (134 m)
- Beam: 46 ft 9 in (14.25 m)
- Draft: 24 ft 9 in (7.54 m)
- Propulsion: 2 × B&W 1200psi boilers; 1 Westinghouse geared turbine; 1 shaft, 35,000 shp (26,000 kW)
- Speed: over 27 knots (31 mph; 50 km/h)
- Range: 4,500 nautical miles (8,330 km) at 20 knots (23 mph; 37 km/h)
- Complement: 18 officers, 267 enlisted
- Sensors & processing systems: AN/SPS-40 Air Search Radar; AN/SPS-67 Surface Search Radar; AN/SQS-26 Sonar; AN/SQR-18 Towed array sonar system; Mk68 Gun Fire Control System
- Electronic warfare & decoys: AN/SLQ-32 Electronics Warfare System
- Armament: one Mk-16 8 cell missile launcher for ASROC and Harpoon missiles; one Mk-42 5-inch/54 caliber gun; Mark 46 torpedoes from four single tube launchers); one Mk-25 BPDMS launcher for Sea Sparrow missiles
- Aircraft carried: one SH-2 Seasprite (LAMPS I) helicopter

USS Patterson (FF-1061) was a United States Navy Knox-class frigate in commission from 1970 to 1991. She was named in honor of Commodore Daniel Todd Patterson (1786-1839), who performed distinguished service at New Orleans during the War of 1812.

Patterson was built at Westwego, Louisiana by Avondale Shipyard. She was commissioned on 14 March 1970, conducted shakedown training out of Guantanamo Bay, Cuba, and in June and August 1971 made her first overseas deployment, a trip to northern Europe. Her next deployment, to the Mediterranean Sea for service with the Sixth Fleet, took place during the first half of 1974. When all newer escort ships were reclassified as frigates in mid-1975, Patterson became FF-1061. At about this time she was also updated, receiving enlarged helicopter facilities and the Basic Point Defense Missile System, whose launcher for eight "Sea Sparrow" guided missiles was installed on her afterdeck.

Patterson made another Mediterranean cruise from late 1976 to mid-1977 and a third in 1978 and early 1979. In September and October 1979 the ship returned to northern European waters and in mid-1980 she provided help to the West Indies island of St. Lucia after it was hit by a devastating hurricane. After steaming east to the Mediterranean in October 1980, Patterson voyaged onward to make a tour of the Persian Gulf during the last months of that year and the first month of 1981. A fifth Sixth Fleet cruise followed from late in 1981 into 1982, with Red Sea operations at the end of the deployment. The frigate earned a Meritorious Unit Commendation for her activities during this time.

In June 1983 Patterson was assigned to the Naval Reserve Force, based at Philadelphia, Pennsylvania. She remained in this non-deploying status for the next eight years, making frequent cruises in the western Atlantic area, from Canada to the West Indies, to keep Naval Reservists' training up to date.

In June 1987 Patterson returned to sea after suffering several small fires from efforts to restart a faulty generator while the ship is conducting drills in the Caribbean. The ship was towed to the Roosevelt Roads naval station, Puerto Rico, for one day of repairs. There were no injuries and no damage to the ship.

In late 1990 Patterson conducted counter-narcotics operations in the Caribbean, taking a two-way passage through the Panama Canal as part of her work. A final cruise, to Bermuda in May 1991, was followed by decommissioning on 30 September 1991.

After more than three years in the Atlantic Reserve Fleet, Patterson was stricken from the Naval Vessel Register on 11 January 1995. Though later considered for transfer to Greece as a source of spare parts, she remained in U.S. Navy custody until late September 1999, when a contract was let for her scrapping. The ship was broken up at Baltimore, Maryland, during the rest of 1999 and the first half of 2000.
