= James H. Blake =

American physician and mayor

James Heighe Blake
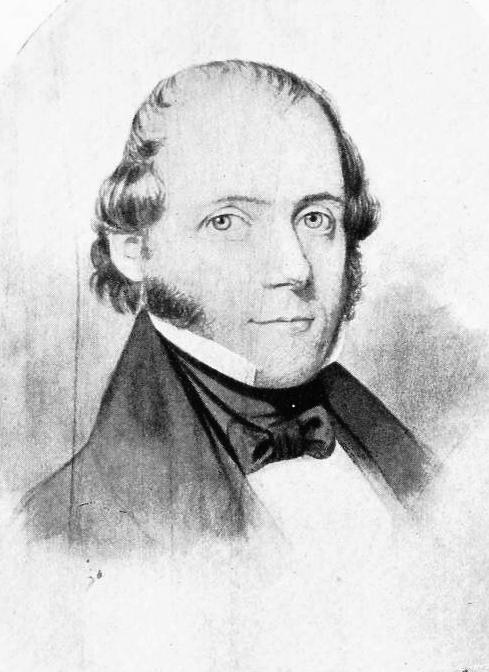

3rd Mayor of the City of Washington, D.C.
- In office June 14, 1813 – June 9, 1817
- Preceded by: Daniel Rapine
- Succeeded by: Benjamin G. Orr

Personal details
- Born: May 11, 1768 Calvert County, Province of Maryland, British America
- Died: July 29, 1819 (aged 51) Washington, D.C., U.S.
- Resting place: Oak Hill Cemetery; Washington, D.C., U.S.
- Party: Independent
- Occupation: Doctor of Medicine
- Known for: Mayor of Washington, D.C., founder St. John's Episcopal Church, Lafayette Square,

James Heighe Blake (11 June 1768 – 29 July 1819) was an American physician and politician who served as the third mayor of Washington, D.C., elected by the council of aldermen in 1813 and serving until 1817.

== Birth ==
Born on June 11, 1768, to Joseph Blake and Mary Heighe in Calvert County, Maryland, descendant of Admiral Robert Blake, The Blakes and Heighes were Maryland colonists, prominent in the Church of England, active in political affairs, and planters with slave holdings.

== Early years ==
He graduated in medicine at the American Medical Society in Philadelphia on 1789 at the age of twenty one.

In 1795, Blake built his home in Washington, D.C., where he was an eminent citizen in the Federal City. In 1800 he moved to Colchester, Virginia. After living for several years in Colchester he returned to District of Columbia in 1809. In the following year he was elected to the First Chamber, Ninth Council and held that position the year after because of informality in the election. On June 14, 1813, the Board convened to elect the Mayor of Washington, D.C. First, second, and third ballots were Mr. Brent and Daniel Rapine with 10 votes each. Blake substituted Mr. Brent and he and Rapine each had 10 votes. Eventually Blake won the election and mayorship. He was reelected 3 times and served as a mayor till 1817.

== Mayorship ==
During his time as a mayor he advocated schools on the Lancastrian system and a reformatory. He also urged the office of Health Officer and in result it was created. As a mayor he started improving city streets and the first navigation of the Eastern Branch, now known as the Anacostia River.

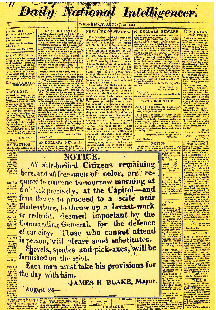
Front page of the Daily National Intelligencer from August 24, 1814, with notice from James H. Blake urging all remaining citizens of Washington to come to the city's defense.

Blake was the mayor of Washington when British troops laid siege to the city on August 24, 1814, as part of the War of 1812. He put the city on alert a few days before the siege, insisting that "I would exert myself to the last moment and agree to die in the streets rather than give up the city, but, if all resistance was given over, and our military abandoned it, I would then also leave it and not surrender myself a prisoner to the enemy." It was Blake who urged Dolley Madison, the First Lady, to flee Washington before the British arrived. He then rounded up men to defend the city, so occupied with its fortification that his wife and four children were forced to make escape on their own.

"Washington was left completely unprotected for the first two years of the war. No fortifications or batteries were erected along either the Potomac or the Eastern Branch. Old Fort Washington was scarcely capable of defending the entire city. Resolutions to place the capital in a defensive state were voted down, largely through the influence of the Secretary of War, General [John] Armstrong. No system of alarms and outposts was established to warn the city of impending danger, and no steps were taken to use the natural advantages of an easily defended eastern boundary."

Once the army forces in Washington had surrendered, and most of the city's residents fled, Blake made a desperate last effort to hold off the British, distributing flyers and handbills and placing an ad in the evening newspaper The Daily National Intelligencer, urging "all able-bodied Citizens remaining here" to meet at the steps of the U.S. Capitol and then proceed to an arsenal at Bladensburg, Maryland, to arm themselves and defend the city. It was too late, however, to save the capital from being burned, and Blake himself finally fled across the Potomac River on the night of the 24th when it became evident that his only alternative was to be taken prisoner.

He was the mayor during the most troublesome period of the United States. Despite much criticism of his inability to save the city, Blake was instrumental in its recovery and reconstruction after the British attack.

== Contributions ==
During the 1820s, Blake was a member of the prestigious society, Columbian Institute for the Promotion of Arts and Sciences, who counted among their members former presidents Andrew Jackson and John Quincy Adams and many prominent men of the day, including well-known representatives of the military, government service, medical and other professions.

Blake attended the organization meeting of the Columbian Institute and was a temporary chairman beginning on October 7, 1816. Later he became one of the permanent officers.

He was one of the first on the board of directors of the Bank of the Metropolis. He was involved in preliminary organization of St. John's Episcopal Church, Lafayette Square and one of the first vestry. He was appointed by President James Madison as a Medical Supervisor with corps of doctors and surgeons. He is one of sixteen people who formed a Medical Society on September 26, 1817.

== Personal ==
Blake had 5 children, Thomas Holdsworth Blake, Dr. John Bond Blake, James Heighe Blake Jr., Joseph Richard Blake and one daughter, Glorvina Blake. Thomas was appointed U.S. Attorney for State of Indiana in 1817.

James Heighe Blake died on July 29, 1819, at the age of fifty two. His remains were interred in the Methodist Episcopal Burial Ground in Georgetown and then moved to the William A. Gordon lot in Oak Hill Cemetery in Washington, D.C., on November 2, 1870.

In 1887, the Blake Public School on North Capital Street NW between K and L, named in his honor, opened. It was a white school that closed some time after 1935.

== Bibliography ==
- Clark, A. 1921. James Heighe Blake, the Third Mayor of the Corporation of Washington DC
- Peter, G. 1951. A Portrait of Old George Town
- McCormick, Mike 2005. Terre Haute, Queen City of the Wabash

Political offices
Preceded by Daniel Rapine	Mayor of Washington, D.C. 1813–1817	Succeeded by Benjamin G. Orr
