= Mary Nelson Winslow =

American social worker (1887–1952)

Mary Nelson Winslow (1887–1952) was a Washington, D.C., social worker who worked in the US Department of Labor's Women's Bureau from 1920 into the late 1930s, conducting many research projects on the status of working women. She was an officer of the National Women's Trade Union League. When the Inter-American Commission of Women was made a permanent subsidiary commission of the Pan-American Union (which later became the Organization of American States) Winslow was made the official US delegate to the commission and served from 1938 to 1944.

== Biography ==
Mary Nelson Winslow was born on September 22, 1887, to Francis Winslow and Harriet Livingston Patterson. On her mother's side, she descended of Carlile Pollock Patterson and the Livingston family, which married into the Jay family and were some of the founding families of the United States.

Winslow attended the New York School of Social Work and by 1920 she was working in the government service as an industrial agent for the US Department of Labor in the Women's Bureau. She had worked her way up to director and editor of exhibits by 1923 and by 1924 was conducting studies on the nature of women in the labor force, including the number of married women employed outside the home, the effect of women working on the family, and the non-acceptance of working wives by employers. Between 1929 and 1941, she also served as legislative representative in Washington, D.C., for the National Women's Trade Union League and then served on its executive board. During that same time, Winslow was nominated by President Franklin D. Roosevelt as the United States representative to the Inter-American Commission of Women (CIM). In a large part, her nomination was used by FDR to oust Doris Stevens from the CIM and transform the organization from a quasi-autonomous advisory group into a subsidiary commission of the Pan American Union. Winslow was appointed the US's official representative at the 1938 Conference of the Pan-American States, held in Lima, Peru and served on the CIM until 1944. She then became an adviser on women's affairs to Nelson Rockefeller.

She died on May 2, 1952, in Washington, D.C., and her papers were donated by her older sister Harriet Winslow to Radcliffe College.

== Selected works ==
- Winslow, Mary Nelson; Peterson, Agnes Lydia; Best, Ethel Lombard; Gordon, Mildred J. (1920). Home work in Bridgeport, Connecticut: December, 1919. Washington, DC: U.S. Government Printing Office.
- Winslow, Mary Nelson; Peterson, Agnes Lydia; Best, Ethel Lombard; Bryan, Helen; Campbell, Agnes Horne (1920). Hours and conditions of work for women in industry in Virginia: March, 1920. Washington, DC: U.S. Government Printing Office.
- Winslow, Mary Nelson (1921). Women's Wages in Kansas. Washington, DC: U.S. Government Printing Office.
- Winslow, Mary Nelson (1921). Health Problems of Women in Industry. Washington, DC: U.S. Government Printing Office.
- Winslow, Mary Nelson (1921). Women Street Car Conductors and Ticket Agents. Washington, DC: U.S. Government Printing Office.
- Winslow, Mary N. (1921). Some effects of legislation limiting hours of work for women. Washington, DC: U.S. Government Printing Office.
- Winslow, Mary N. (March 1922). "Medians of Women's Earnings in Four States". Journal of the American Statistical Association. 18 (137). Boston, Massachusetts: American Statistical Association: 106–108. doi:10.2307/2277476. JSTOR 2277476.
- Winslow, Mary Nelson (1923). The share of wage-earning women in family support. Washington, DC: U.S. Government Printing Office.
- Winslow, Mary Nelson; Robinson, Mary Viola (1924). Radio Talks on Women in Industry. Washington, DC: U.S. Government Printing Office.
- Winslow, Mary Nelson (1924). Married Women in Industry. Washington, DC: U.S. Government Printing Office.
- Winslow, Mary Nelson (1928). Summary: the effects of labor legislation on the employment opportunities of women. Washington, DC: U.S. Government Printing Office.
- Winslow, Mary Nelson; Speek, Frances Valiant; Speek, Peter Alexander (1930). Variations in Employment Trends of Women and Men. Washington, DC: U.S. Government Printing Office.
- Anderson, Mary; Winslow, Mary N. (1951). Woman at Work: The Autobiography of Mary Anderson as told to Mary N. Winslow. Minneapolis, Minnesota: University of Minnesota Press – via Project MUSE.
