= Daniel Patterson (naval officer) =

United States Navy officer (1786–1839)

Daniel Todd Patterson
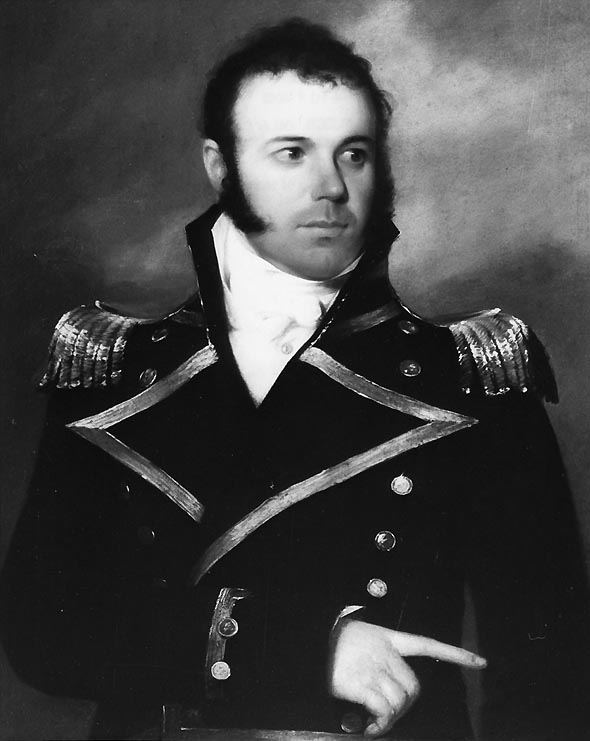

Personal details
- Born: Daniel Todd Patterson; March 6, 1786 Long Island, New York, U.S.
- Died: August 25, 1839 (aged 53) Wilmington, Delaware, U.S.
- Resting place: Congressional Cemetery, Washington, D.C., US
- Relations: Walter Patterson (uncle); Robert Livingston (grandfather)
- Children: Thomas H. Patterson; Carlile Pollock Patterson

Military service
- Branch/service: United States Navy
- Years of service: 1799–1839
- Rank: Captain
- Commands: New Orleans station (US Navy); Constitution; Mediterranean Squadron; Washington Navy Yard
- Battles/wars: Quasi-War; First Barbary War; Battle of Tripoli Harbor; War of 1812; Battle of New Orleans

Daniel Todd Patterson (March 6, 1786 – August 25, 1839) was a United States Navy officer who served during the Quasi-War, First Barbary War, and War of 1812.

== Early life ==
Patterson was born on Long Island, New York. He was a son of John Patterson and Catherine (née Livingston) Patterson (1744–1832). His father was a younger brother of Walter Patterson, who was the first Royal Governor of Prince Edward Island (then named St. John's Island). John and Walter came to America in the 1750s from Ramelton or Rathmullan, County Donegal, and served in the British Army during the French and Indian War.

His paternal grandfather was Robert Livingston, 3rd Lord of the Livingston Manor. His maternal aunt, Mary Livingston, was the wife of James Duane, a respected lawyer, patriot, New York politician, and judge.

== Career ==
As acting midshipman, he joined the sloop of war Delaware, June 11, 1799, to cruise against French privateers and warships in the West Indies to August 1800. Appointed a midshipman on August 20, 1800 (warrant subsequently altered to take rank from date of his original entry, June 11, 1799). After the war, was one of the midshipmen retained in the Navy under the Peace Establishment Act, signed by President Adams in one of his last official acts, on March 3, 1801. On close of the Quasi-War with France, he resumed nautical studies, then had blockade duty off Tripoli in Constellation and Philadelphia. On October 13, 1803, he fell prisoner upon capture of Philadelphia, commanded by William Bainbridge, when the vessel ran aground on an uncharted reef off the coast of Tripoli, and remained a captive of the Barbary pirates until the American victory over Tripoli in 1805.

Upon returning home, he spent much of his following years on a posting to the New Orleans station (US Navy), where he took command after the outbreak of the War of 1812. He was promoted to Lieutenant in 1807. On March 21, 1808, he was ordered to report to the New Orleans station, under the command of Captain David Porter. He was in semi-independent command of a flotilla of gunboats based in Natchez, Mississippi from about January 1810 to February 1811.

On July 24, 1813, Patterson was promoted from Lieutenant to Master Commandant. On October 18, 1813, he was given command of the Naval Station at New Orleans. On September 16, 1814, Patterson raided the base of the pirate Jean Laffite at Barataria Bay, in cooperation with Colonel George T. Ross, capturing six schooners and other small craft. In that same month, he refused Andrew Jackson's request to send his few naval units to Mobile Bay where Patterson knew they would be bottled up by a superior Royal Navy fleet. Patterson's naval assets were limited to six gunboats, a schooner, a sloop, as well as the USS Carolina (1812) and USS Louisiana (1812).

Foreseeing British designs against New Orleans almost two months before their attack, Patterson, not Jackson, was the first to prepare to defend the city. On November 18, he outlined his plans to use the Louisiana, in concert with shore batteries, in a letter to the Secretary of the Navy. The American victory at the Battle of New Orleans resulted as much from his foresight and preparations as from Jackson's able fighting. His flotilla delayed the British advance at the Battle of Lake Borgne until reinforcements arrived, then gave artillery support in defense of the fortifications on the right bank of the Mississippi River, from fortifications or craft borne in the Mississippi.

Patterson, highly commended by Jackson, received a note of thanks from Congress, and was promoted to Captain on February 28, 1815. Patterson remained on the southern stations until 1824. Because of failing health, Thomas Macdonough relinquished command of USS Constitution whereupon Patterson then assumed command and became fleet captain and commander of this flagship in Commodore John Rodgers' Mediterranean Squadron.

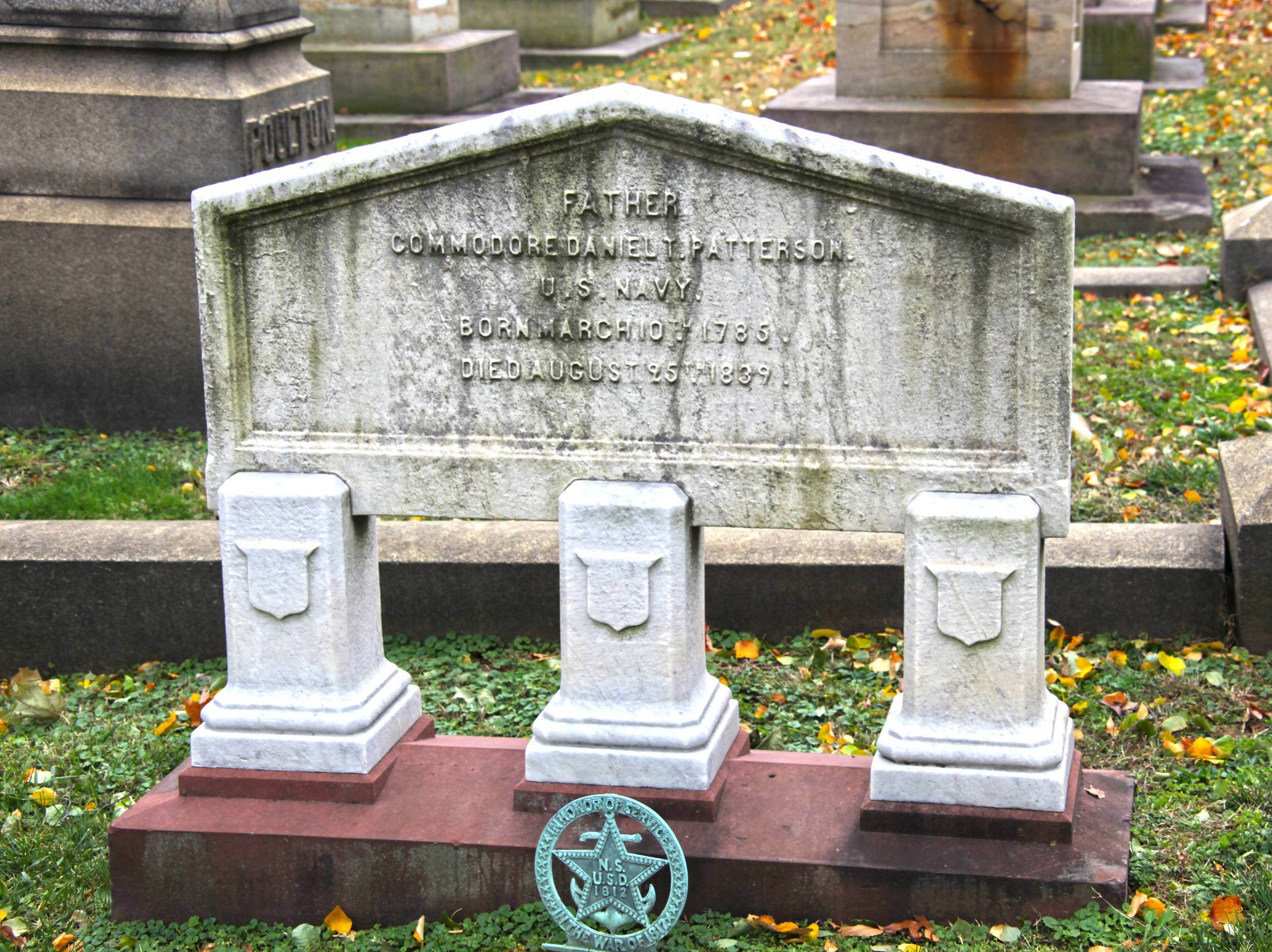
Grave at Congressional Cemetery

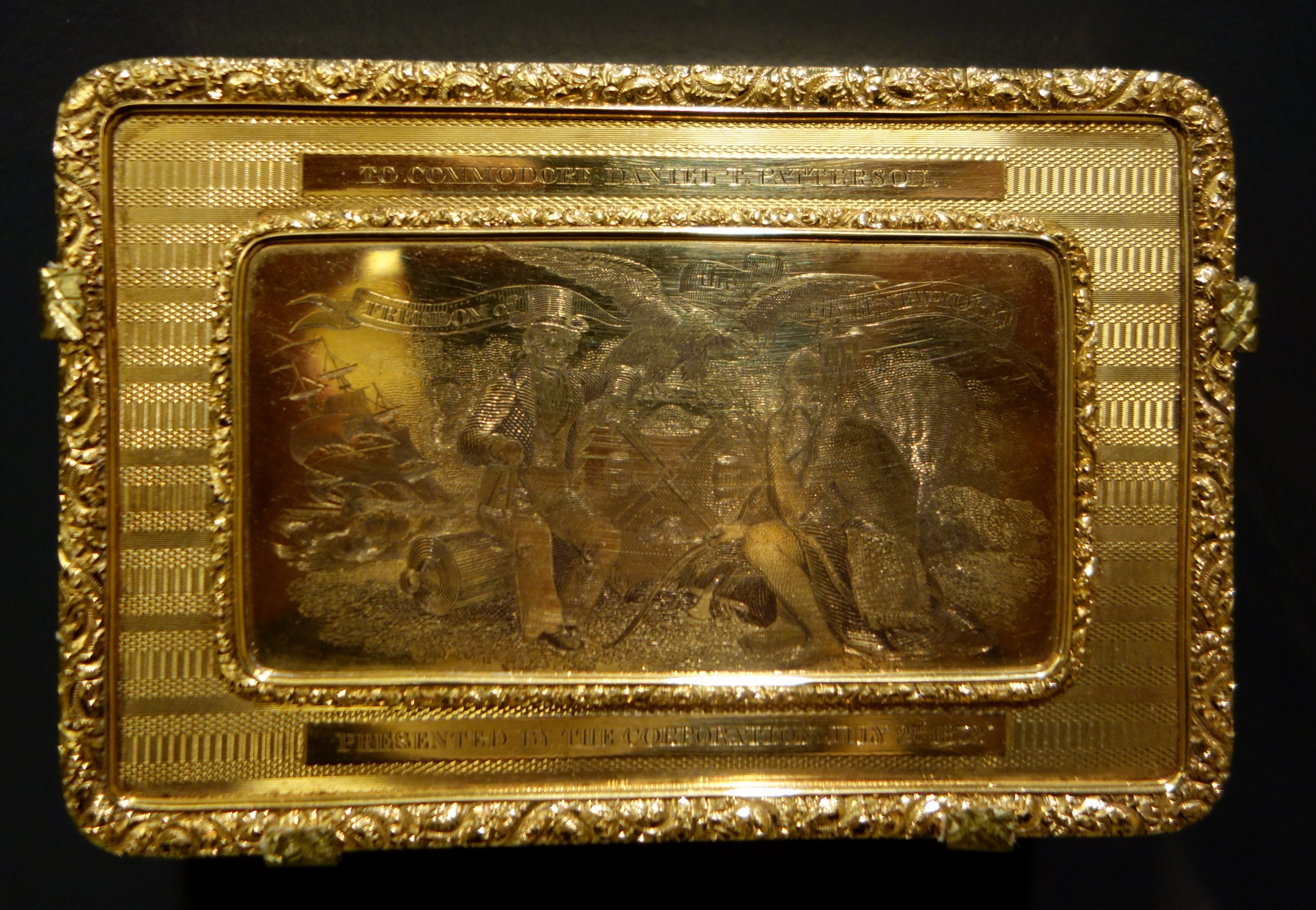
Gold 'Freedom of the City Box' for Daniel T. Patterson, made by Jonathan Wilmarth, John L. Moffat, and Joseph Curtis, New York City, 1832

Returning home in 1828, he was appointed one of the three Navy commissioners. He commanded the Mediterranean Squadron from 1832 to 1836. He then took command of the Washington Navy Yard in 1836, an office he held until his death at Wilmington, Delaware, August 25, 1839. Daniel Todd Patterson and his wife are buried in Congressional Cemetery, Washington, D.C.

The Life of Gould, an Ex-Man-of-War's Man, by Roland Gould (1867), noted on a website of the Navy Department Library at the Washington Navy Yard, purportedly contains a first-person account of the death of Commodore Patterson.

=== Rank ===
Although Patterson is properly called a "Commodore", during his years in the Navy this was not one of the hierarchical "line" ranks. Instead, "Commodore" applied to any officer in command of a fleet of two or more ships, regardless of the officer's "line" rank at the time, and regardless of whether the officer also held the dual role of commanding officer of one of the ships in the fleet. Thus Patterson was a Commodore at the time of the Battle of New Orleans because he commanded a fleet of ships, even though he was not promoted to the "line" rank of Captain until after the battle. He again became a Commodore when in command of the Mediterranean Squadron. Patterson was never an Admiral because in his day the highest "line" rank in the US Navy was Captain; the title Admiral was felt to smack of aristocracy and royalty, and did not become a "line" rank in the US Navy until the Civil War.

== Personal life ==
Patterson was married to George Ann Pollock (1787–1851) of New Orleans, a daughter of George Pollock and Catherine (née Yates) Pollock. Both her father and grandfather, Richard Yates, were successful merchants in New York, with their firm Yates & Pollock who were driven out of business around 1800, when their ships and cargoes were seized by French privateers during the Quasi-War. Pollock moved to New Orleans, where his uncle Oliver Pollock, a financier of patriot operations during the Revolution, had been in business. Together, Daniel and George Ann were the parents of:

- Griffith E. Patterson (1810-1837), who died a young death while attending Medical College of Ohio, at Cincinnati College.
- Carlile Pollock Patterson (1816–1881), who married Elizabeth Pearson, a daughter of U.S. Representative from North Carolina Joseph Pearson.
- Thomas Harmon Patterson (1820–1889), who married Maria Montresor Wainwright (1823–1881), a daughter of Col. Robert Dewar Wainwright, sister of Richard Wainwright, and cousin of Commander Jonathan Mayhew Wainwright.
- Eliza Catherine Patterson (1815–1884), who married George Mifflin Bache, a brother of Alexander Dallas Bache.
- George Ann Patterson (1818–1893), who married Adm. David Dixon Porter, a son of U.S. Minister Resident to the Ottoman Empire David Porter, in 1839.

Patterson died on August 25, 1839.

== Namesakes ==
Three ships in the United States Navy have been named USS Patterson for him.

There is a Patterson Drive in New Orleans, on the west bank of the Mississippi River, close to the levee, which in all likelihood was named for Commodore Patterson because of his War of 1812 service there.

== See also ==
- Bibliography of early American naval history

== Bibliography ==
- "Patterson, Daniel Todd". ZB (Personnel) Files in the Navy Department Library » ZB Files - P » – via Naval History and Heritage Command.
- Ainsworth, Walden L. (February 1945). "An Amphibious Operation That Failed: The Battle of New Orleans". Proceedings of the United States Naval Institute. 71 (504): 193–202.
- Daughan, George C. (2011). 1812: The Navy's War. New York: Basic Books. ISBN 978-0-465-02046-1.
- Fredriksen, John C. (1999). American Military Leaders: A-L. v. 2. M-Z. ABC-CLIO, California. p. 926.
- Hughes, Christine F.; Brodine, Charles E., eds. (2023). The Naal War of 1812: A Documentary History, Vol. 4. Washington: Naval Historical Center (GPO). ISBN 978-1-943604-36-4.
- Maclay, Edgar Stanton (1894). A history of the United States Navy, from 1775 to 1893. D. Appleton & Company, New York. p. 11.
- MacDonough, Rodney (1909). Life of Commodore Thomas Macdonough, U. S. Navy. The Fort Hill press, Boston, Mass., 1909. pp. 293–304.
- Smith, Gene Allen (2008). "Preventing the "Eggs of Insurrection" from Hatching: The U.S. Navy and Control of the Mississippi River, 1806-1815" (PDF). Northern Mariner. issue Nos. 3-4, (July–October 2008). 18 (3–4). The Canadian Nautical Research Society: 79–91. doi:10.25071/2561-5467.355. S2CID 247349162.
- Sweetman, Jack (2002). American Naval History: An Illustrated Chronology of the U.S. Navy and Marine Corps, 1775–present. Annapolis, MD: Naval Institute Press. ISBN 1-55750-867-4.
- Walker, Alexander (1856). Jackson and New Orleans. An authentic narrative of the memorable achievements of the American army, under Andrew Jackson, before New Orleans, in the winter of 1814, '15. J. C. Derby. p. 411.
