= Carlile Pollock Patterson =

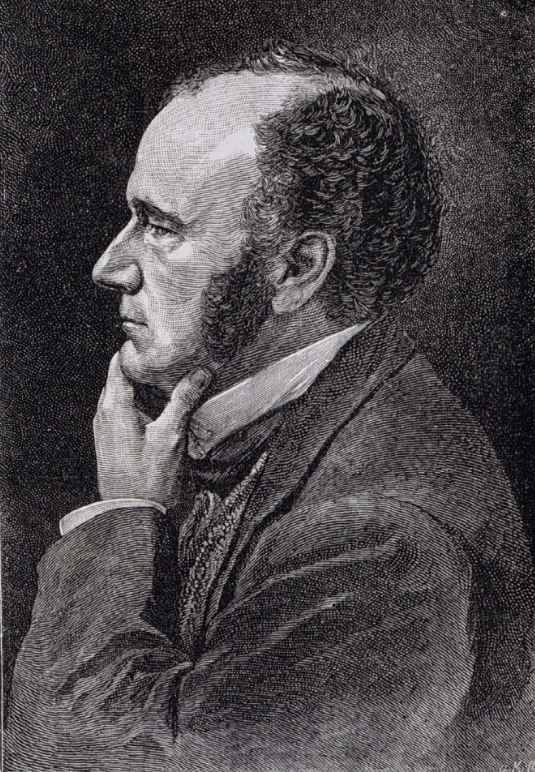
Carlile P. Patterson

Carlile Pollock Patterson (August 24, 1816 – August 15, 1881) was the fourth superintendent of the United States Coast and Geodetic Survey. He was born in Bay St. Louis, Mississippi, the son of Commodore Daniel Todd Patterson. He was appointed a midshipman in the United States Navy in 1830. He studied civil engineering at Georgetown College, graduating in 1838, and returned to the Navy, assigned to work with the U.S. Coast Survey. He left the Navy in 1853 and captained mail steamers in the Pacific Ocean. In 1861, as a civilian, he was appointed as Hydrographic Inspector of the United States Coast Survey. In 1874, he was made Superintendent of the U.S. Coast Survey (renamed the U.S. Coast and Geodetic Survey in 1878), a position he held until his death. In 1880, he was elected as a member to the American Philosophical Society.

== Biography ==
=== Family ===
Patterson was born in Shieldsboro (now Bay St. Louis), Mississippi, the son of United States Navy Captain (later Commodore) Daniel Patterson. He was the brother of U.S. Navy Rear Admiral Thomas H. Patterson; of Elizabeth Catherine Patterson, who married George Mifflin Bache (brother of U.S. Coast Survey superintendent Alexander Dallas Bache); and of George Ann Patterson, who married U.S. Navy Admiral David Dixon Porter.

Patterson married Elizabeth Pearson (daughter of Representative Joseph Pearson of North Carolina) on January 23, 1851, in the Pearson family home, Brentwood, in Washington D.C. They had several children; at least three daughters reached adulthood.

=== Navy service ===
Patterson was appointed midshipman on the U.S. Navy frigate USS Brandywine in 1830 and served in the Mediterranean Squadron for five years. He was warranted midshipman in 1831 and passed midshipman in 1836. He graduated from Georgetown College in Kentucky as a civil engineer in 1838, and was attached to the United States Coast Survey from 1838 to 1841. In 1839 he was an officer aboard the Coast Survey brig Washington when she captured the Spanish slave ship La Amistad, which the slaves had commandeered, off Montauk, New York, an incident that became the subject of the 1997 film Amistad. He was commissioned as a lieutenant in 1841. As the first commanding officer of the Coast Survey schooner USCS Phoenix, he led the first USCS hydrographic expedition to the Gulf of Mexico in 1845, and subsequently commanded the Coast Survey steamer USCS Robert J. Walker. He left active naval service in 1849 and resigned from the Navy in 1853.

=== Steamer captain ===
Leaving naval service for the commercial world, he commanded steamers of the Pacific Mail Steamship Company, such as the Oregon and the Golden Gate from 1849 to about 1853, primarily running between the west coast of Panama and San Francisco. His ships sometimes carried as many as a thousand gold-seeking men per voyage north during the California Gold Rush. He appears frequently as ship-captain in the reports of the newspaper The Daily Alta California. When California was made a state by Act of Congress, it was Patterson who brought the news to San Francisco, arriving on October 18, 1850, resulting in city-wide celebrations lasting well into the night.

Shortly after this, Patterson moved his wife and child from Washington, D.C., to Oakland. With James B. LaRue and John R. Fouratt he sought to found one of the first ferry services across San Francisco Bay, fighting all the way to the U.S. Supreme Court to win the right to provide service against a competitor. It is unclear, however, if he and his partners actually started a separate ferry line, and if so, how long it operated before being sold to another operator or shut down. He also engaged in real estate investments in San Francisco and San Diego. Several more children were born during this time in the Bay Area.

=== Civil War ===
In 1861, on the outbreak of the American Civil War, the family returned to Washington, D.C. and Patterson returned to federal service, this time as a civilian hydrographic inspector in the Coast Survey. The Hydrographic Inspector was in charge of the charting and marine survey work, and that office was traditionally held by a naval officer. Patterson's experience and good connections let him step into the role smoothly. During the Civil War, the role of the Coast Survey included preparing charts and other material to help United States Navy ships execute the Union blockade of Confederate ports (the strategy known as the "Anaconda Plan"). He remained in the Coast Survey after the war ended in 1865, eventually becoming its superintendent in 1874. During his superintendency, it was renamed the United States Coast and Geodetic Survey in 1878.

=== Friendship with President Grant ===
Patterson first met Ulysses S. Grant in mid-1852, when Grant was taking a detachment of troops across Panama for eventual posting in Oregon, and Patterson commanded the steamer that took most of Grant's troops north to San Francisco. It was during that posting in Oregon that Grant eventually, in 1854, decided to resign from the Army. During the Civil War, Grant coordinated with Patterson's brother-in-law, David Dixon Porter, in the Vicksburg Campaign, and may have met Patterson's brother, Thomas H. Patterson, who was a naval officer fighting in the Civil War. As a result of these pre-war and wartime connections, the Pattersons were well-known to Grant and other leading Union officers. From 1861 through the 1880s, the Pattersons occupied the Brentwood Mansion, designed by Benjamin Latrobe and inherited by Patterson's wife, in Brentwood, Washington, D.C., (since demolished), and it became a social center during the administration of President Grant.

Patterson was one of the early members of Washington's Metropolitan Club, which included numerous Union generals, admirals, and other officers. A large oil portrait of Patterson's brother-in-law, David Dixon Porter, hangs in the first-floor lobby (as of 2007). Many of Patterson's papers can be found in the Manuscript Division of the U.S. Library of Congress.

=== Death and honors ===
Patterson died at home in mid-1881. His unexpected death was a heavy blow to the Survey and led to the appointment of J.E. Hilgard as his successor; Hilgaard's term ended in controversy a few years later.

Patterson, along with his wife, mother-in-law, and infant children who died in California, are buried in the Worthington vault of Oak Hill Cemetery, Washington D.C. His sister Eliza Catherine was also interred at Oak Hill Cemetery, while there is a cenotaph in Congressional Cemetery for her husband George Mifflin Bache, who was lost at sea. Patterson's father, Commodore Daniel Patterson, and his mother and brother, Thomas H. Patterson, were buried at Congressional Cemetery. Another sister, George Ann, and her husband David Dixon Porter were interred at Arlington National Cemetery.

The survey ship USC&GS Carlile P. Patterson, in service from 1884-1919, was named in his honor. The Patterson Glacier, and the Patterson River that runs from it, located south of Juneau, Alaska, near the town of Petersburg, a spectacular valley glacier featured in helicopter tours, are named for him. Patterson Street in northeast Washington, D.C., near his Brentwood estate, may also have been named for him.

== A bill for Patterson's widow ==
On June 6, 1884, three years after Patterson's death, Congress enacted a private bill, House bill No. 4689, entitled "An act for the relief of Eliza W. Patterson", Patterson's widow, excusing accumulated District of Columbia property taxes on the Patterson land, in light of the fact that Patterson had served as Superintendent without taking a salary and had, through inattention, placed the family finances in jeopardy. President Chester A. Arthur neither signed nor vetoed the bill, but held it ten days and allowed it to become law without his signature. In a message dated June 21, 1884, the President explained "I do not question the constitutional right of Congress to pass a law relieving the family of an officer, in view of the services he had rendered his country, from the burdens of taxation, but I submit to Congress that this just gift of the nation to the family of such faithful officer should come from the National Treasury rather than from that of this District, and I therefore recommend that an appropriation be made to reimburse the District for the amount of taxes which would have been due to it had this act not become a law."

A portion of this property later became the subject of a lawsuit that reached the Supreme Court, Winslow v. Baltimore & O R Co, 188 U.S. 646 (1903), which includes excerpts of the will by which Mrs. Patterson came into the property on the death of her mother, Catherine Worthington Pearson, in 1868. The suit, which the Patterson family won, involved renewal of a lease of some of the land to a railroad.

== Descendants ==
In 1881, shortly after Patterson's death, his daughter, Harriet Livingston Patterson (1859-1923), married Lt. Francis Winslow USN (1851-1908), who had previously served under Patterson in the U.S. Coast Survey. They had six children, including Mary Nelson Winslow. Lt. Winslow was the brother of Rear Admiral Cameron McRae Winslow, a first cousin once removed of Rear Admiral John Ancrum Winslow, and great-uncle of the Pulitzer Prize-winning poet Robert Lowell. Patterson's grandson and namesake Carlile Patterson Winslow (1884-1960) was an engineer and head of the USDA Forest Products Laboratory at Madison, Wisconsin 1917-1946.

Government offices
Preceded by Benjamin Peirce	Superintendent, United States Coast Survey; 1874–1878	Succeeded by Incumbent
Preceded by Incumbent	Superintendent, United States Coast and Geodetic Survey; 1878–1881	Succeeded by Julius Erasmus Hilgard
