= Jonathan Young (commodore) =

United States naval officer (1826–1885)

- Born: 27 November 1826; Ohio, U.S.
- Died: 17 May 1885 (aged 58); New London, Connecticut, U.S.
- Burial place: Green-Wood Cemetery, Brooklyn, New York
- Military career
- Allegiance: United States of America
- Branch: United States Navy
- Service years: 1841–1885
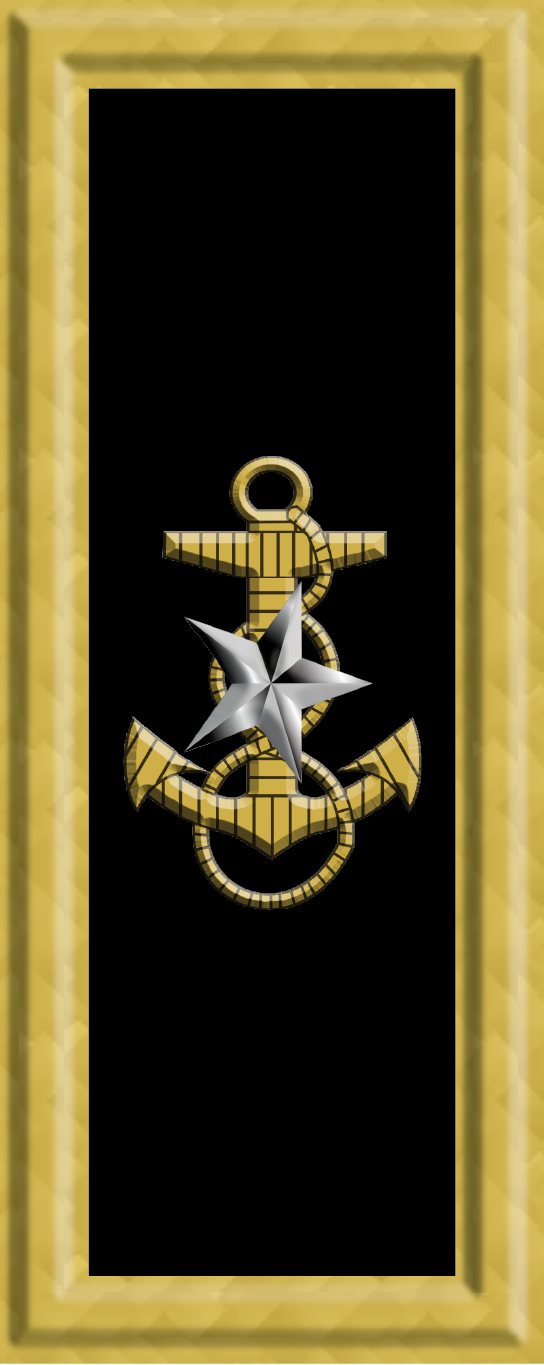
- Rank: commodore
- Commands: USS Pembina; USS Cimarron; USS Sangamon; Receiving ship USS Vandalia; USS Mahaska; Receiving ship USS Ohio; USS Tennessee; Asiatic Squadron; New London Navy Yard
- Conflicts: African Slave Trade Patrol; Mexican War; Puget Sound War; Paraguay Expedition; American Civil War; Union blockade; Battle of Hatteras Inlet Batteries; Battle of Port Royal

Commodore Jonathan Young (27 November 1826 – 17 May 1885) was an officer in the United States Navy. He participated in anti-piracy actions and the African Slave Trade Patrol, fought in the Mexican War, Puget Sound War, and American Civil War, and served briefly as commander of the Asiatic Squadron.

== Naval career ==
Young was born in Ohio, on 27 November 1826. He was appointed as a midshipman from Illinois on 19 October 1841 and served in the Home Squadron from 1841 to 1844, attached first to the paddle steamer USS Mississippi and then to the sloop-of-war USS Vincennes. While in the Home Squadron, he was part of a boat expedition against pirates at the Isle of Pines south of Cuba in 1842 and participated in the capture of a slave ship carrying 500 African slaves.

From 1845 to 1848, Young was attached to the 74-gun ship-of-the-line USS Columbus, the flagship of Commodore James Biddle, commander of the East India Squadron. During his time aboard Columbus, the ship sailed first to the East Indies and then continued around the world, stopping at Edo, Japan, in July 1846 to forcibly deliver a letter requesting the opening of trade between the United States and Japan from President of the United States James K. Polk to the Emperor of Japan, Kōmei, and receive a reply. Later in the voyage, she operated off California from 1847 to 1848 during the Mexican War before completing her circumnavigation of the globe in 1848. Young was promoted to passed midshipman on 10 August 1847.

Young served aboard the sailing frigate USS Raritan, flagship of Commodore Foxhall A. Parker, Sr., the commander of the Home Squadron, from 1849 to 1850, and then aboard the sloop-of-war USS St. Mary's in the Pacific Squadron from 1850 to 1852; he again sailed around the world while aboard St. Mary's. He then performed duty at the United States Naval Observatory in Washington, D.C., during 1853. He served aboard the steamer USS Massachusetts from 1854 to 1857; while aboard Massachusetts, he was promoted to master on 14 September 1855 and to lieutenant the following day, and in 1855 gained distinction for commanding landing forces in combat with Native Americans during the Puget Sound War in the Washington Territory. After duty at the Naval Observatory again in 1858, he was aboard the steamer USS Western Port from 1858 to 1859 to participate in the Paraguay Expedition before another tour at the Naval Observatory from 1859 to 1860.

In 1860, Young reported aboard the sidewheel steam frigate USS Susquehanna, which operated in the Gulf of Mexico, Mediterranean Squadron, and along the United States East Coast. He was aboard Susqehanna when the American Civil War broke out in April 1861, and participated in the Union blockade of the Confederate States of America. He also took part aboard Susquehanna in the seizure of Hatteras Inlet, North Carolina, on 28 August 1861 and the Battle of Port Royal at Port Royal, South Carolina, on 7 November 1861. From November 1861 to June 1862, he was executive officer of the sloop-of-war USS Jamestown, engaged in the blockade of Wilmington, North Carolina, and from June 1862 to November 1862 he was executive officer of the sidewheel steam frigate USS Powhatan on blockade duty off Charleston, South Carolina, being promoted to lieutenant commander on 16 July 1862.

Young was commanding officer of the steam gunboat USS Pembina in 1863. Pembina, on blockade duty in the Gulf of Mexico off Mobile Bay, Alabama, fought an engagement with a Confederate artillery battery which had been emplaced with a goal of driving her farther offshore; she succeeded in silencing the battery and forcing it to withdraw inland. She also came under fire from Confederate troops on shore while she was destroying a blockade runner that had run aground. After contracting a fever while on duty in the harbor of Pensacola, Florida, later in 1863, Young was assigned to temporary ordnance duty until he could make a full recovery. Once recovered, he became commanding officer of the double-ended steam gunboat USS Cimarron on blockade duty in the Atlantic Ocean off South Carolina and Georgia from March to July 1864, when he took command of the monitor USS Sangamon in the blockade off Charleston, South Carolina. He remained in command of Sangamon until the fall of Savannah, Georgia, and Charleston, seeing action in all the attacks on the defenses of Charleston Harbor from July 1864 to February 1865, after which Sangamon served off Wilmington, North Carolina, and on Virginia's James River. For the gallantry, zeal, and effectiveness of his Civil War service, Young received letters of commendation from Vice Admiral David Dixon Porter, Rear Admirals Theodorus Bailey, John A. Dahlgren, and Sylvanus William Godon, Commodore William H. Gardner, and many others under whom he had served, and the Board of Admirals recommended him for promotion.

Young detached from Sangamon in the final weeks of the Civil War, on 28 March 1865. He then was commanding officer of the receiving ship USS Vandalia at Portsmouth Navy Yard in Kittery, Maine, until 1867, and was promoted to commander on 25 July 1866. He returned to sea as commanding officer of the sidewheel steamer USS Mahaska in the North Atlantic Squadron from 1867 to 1868. He then served ashore at the Naval Observatory from 1869 to 1870 and the Portsmouth Navy Yard from 1871 to 1872, and then as commanding officer of the receiving ship USS Ohio from 1872 to 1873. He was promoted to captain on 8 November 1873, performed duty at the Portsmouth Navy Yard from 1873 to 1876, and commanded the screw frigate USS Tennessee, flagship of the Asiatic Squadron, from 1876 to 1878, and temporarily was the commander of the Asiatic Squadron from 12 August to 14 October 1877.

Young was at the Portsmouth Navy Yard again from 1879 to 1881, and was promoted to commodore on 19 June 1882. He became commandant of the New London Navy Yard in New London, Connecticut, in 1882, remaining in that position until his death.

== Death ==
Young died at Crocker House in New London on 17 May 1885 of a recurring fever he had contracted six weeks previously in Washington, D.C., while sitting as a member of the court martial of former Surgeon General of the United States Navy Philip S. Wales. He is buried with his wife and children at Green-Wood Cemetery in Brooklyn, New York.

== Notes ==
Military offices
Preceded by William Reynolds	Commander, Asiatic Squadron; 12 August 1877–4 October 1877	Succeeded by Thomas H. Patterson
