= Geneva Gazette =

19th century newspaper, upstate New York

Geneva Gazette was an upstate New York 19th century newspaper that was discontinued in 1901.

== History ==
The first issue was published June 21, 1809. The paper, which also used the title Geneva Daily Gazette, was cited by other newspapers, including The New York Times. Its print frequency was daily for some of its years, weekly others. The Geneva Gazette and Mercantile Advertiser was another name they used.

In 1887 they appealed to their readership on behalf of an 1878-founded clerically-operated medical facility, writing that "its doors are ever open to the unfortunate without distinction of faith or nationality." This was several years before the 1898 opening of a local hospital.

In 1890 the Gazette was one of several newspapers to print (for a fee) a state government notice.
