= Daniel Rapine =

American politician

2nd Mayor of the City of Washington, D.C.
- In office June 8,1812 – June 14,1813
- Preceded by: Robert Brent
- Succeeded by: James H. Blake

Personal details
- Born: June 11, 1768 Germantown, Pennsylvania, US
- Died: July 29, 1826 (aged 58) Washington, DC, US
- Resting place: Congressional Cemetery

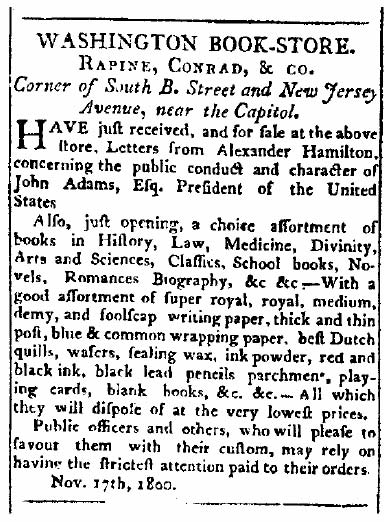
Advertisement for Daniel Rapine's bookstore in Washington, D.C.

Daniel Rapine (June 11, 1768 – July 28 or July 29, 1826) was an American politician who served as the second mayor of Washington, D.C., elected by the city council in June 1812 and serving for one year.

== History ==
Rapine was a bookseller, printer and politician. He move to Washington from his birthplace of Philadelphia in 1800 to open a bookstore in the new capital. He and his partner John Conrad opened the Washington Printing and Bookselling Company across the street from the Capitol. His bookstore became the intellectual center of early Washington. He married Charlotte Gillette, and had 3 daughters.

=== Mayor of Washington D.C. ===
He served on the City Council from 1802 to 1806 and then again in 1812. At that time Congress restructured city ordinances to create a council of aldermen for the city, which in turn elected the mayor. Both Rapine and the incumbent (appointed) mayor, Robert Brent, sought the office from the council, who voted to a tie between the two candidates; the matter was settled by a coin toss, which gave the office to Rapine.

=== Career ===
At that time, the mayor was an employee of the Federal government, with power to levy only very small taxes on the citizens of Washington City. Rapine raised money in two significant acts: by addressing the Congress and asking for appropriations for the city — especially after the War of 1812 was declared, when he received federal money to fund the city's defenses — and by creating a city lottery, whose proceeds went to the creation of two schools and a public water works.

=== Societies ===
During the 1820s, Rapine was a member of the prestigious society, Columbian Institute for the Promotion of Arts and Sciences, which counted among their members former presidents Andrew Jackson and John Quincy Adams and many prominent men of the day, including well-known representatives of the military, government service, medical and other professions.

=== Later in life ===
Rapine returned to the bookselling business after his term as mayor, although he was also appointed a justice of the peace for Washington County by President James Madison. He served as Postmaster of the House of Representatives in the 1820s, until his death in July 1826.

== Death ==
Daniel Rapine died on May 11, 1826, after a long illness and was buried in an unmarked grave in Congressional Cemetery. He was the only of the early mayors to not have a school named for him.

Political offices
Preceded by Robert Brent	Mayor of Washington, D.C. 1812–1813	Succeeded by James H. Blake
