= Geneva General Hospital =

New York (state) hospital system

- Finger Lakes Health
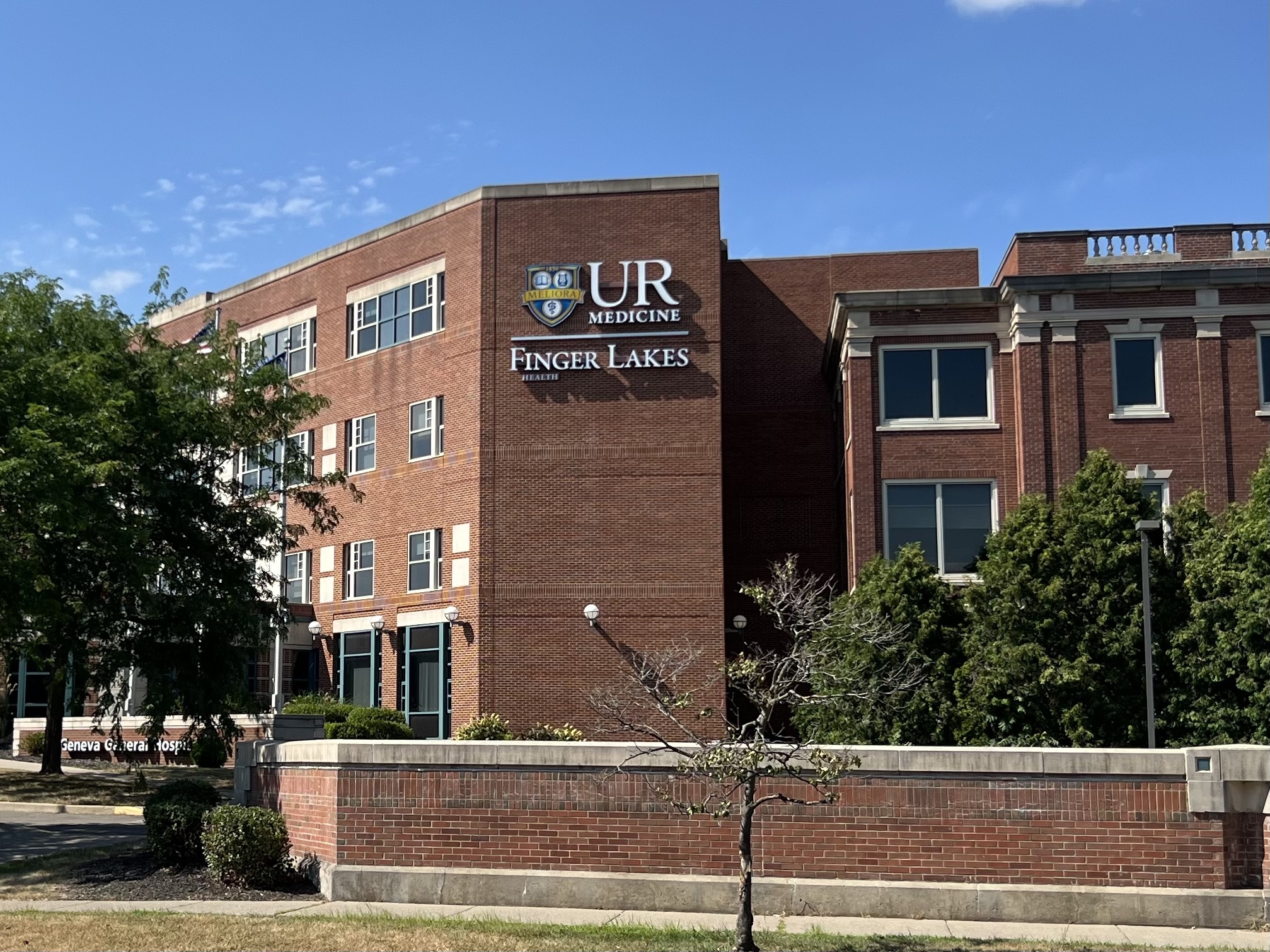

Geography
- Location: Geneva, Ontario County, New York, United States
- Coordinates: 42°52′36″N 76°59′17″W

Organization
- Type: General

Services
- Beds: 132

History
- Opened: 1898

Links
- Lists: Hospitals in New York State

Geneva General Hospital is a 132-bed hospital founded in 1898, in upstate New York. It offers additional outpatient services via clinics. It also operates two nursing homes and a nursing school; the latter's program offers a two-year A.S. (Associate degree in Science).

== History ==
Geneva General Hospital is part Finger Lakes Health (FHL), an association of hospitals and clinics in the area. To expand access to medical specialties for Geneva General and others in FHL, the latter began a clinical collaboration with a larger upstate medical organization.

In addition to its Marion S. Whelan School of Practical Nursing, with 1934 roots to an 1898-founded earlier nursing school (as part of the hospital's founding), Geneva General has an affiliation to Finger Lakes College of Nursing & Health Sciences.
