= Lewis N. Wood =

American politician

Lewis Newton Wood was a member of the Wisconsin State Assembly.

== Biography ==
Wood was born on January 12, 1799, in Cumberland County, New York. He married Naomi Davis on October 21, 1821. They had eight children. In 1837, Wood graduated from Geneva Medical College.

Wood moved to Big Foot Prairie, Wisconsin, in 1839. In 1856, he relocated to Baraboo, Wisconsin, where he died on March 10, 1868. He was a Baptist.

== Career ==
Wood was a member of the Assembly in 1852. He was Superintendent of Schools of Walworth, Wisconsin. He was a Whig.
