= Robert Brent =

American mayor (1764–1819)

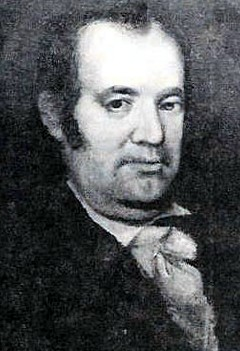
- Robert Brent portrait painting, circa 1805

1st Mayor of the City of Washington
- In office June 1,1802 – June 8,1812
- Preceded by: Office created
- Succeeded by: Daniel Rapine

Personal details
- Born: 1764 Woodstock, Stafford County, Virginia
- Died: September 7, 1819 (aged 54–55) Washington, D.C.
- Party: Democratic-Republican Party
- Spouse: Mary Young
- Children: William Brent Jr.
- Relatives: John Carroll (uncle)
- Profession: Quarry owner

Robert Brent (1764 – September 7, 1819) was the first mayor of the City of Washington, federal capital of the United States of America. Brent was born into a prominent Catholic family, members of which emigrated to the Maryland colony in the 17th century and for which the Brent Society is named.

== Early life ==
Brent was born in 1764, on the Woodstock estate in Aquia, Stafford County, Virginia. to parents Robert Brent and Anne Carroll Brent. Several of his ancestors had emigrated to northeastern Virginia after a political falling out with the Calvert family, the proprietors of the Maryland colony, and the Brents retained their Catholic faith, practicing it quietly when it became illegal in the Virginia colony. His maternal uncle, John Carroll became the first Catholic Bishop appointed for the United States, and traveled from his Maryland base into Virginia occasionally to conduct religious services at Brent family properties. Several of his Brent ancestors and relatives were lawyers and even members of the Virginia legislature representing Stafford County and later (when it was created) adjoining Prince William County, in addition to operating plantations using enslaved labor. Brent's father was a businessman who also owned the Aquia quarry.

In 1789 or 1787, Brent married Mary Young—the daughter of Notley Young, a plantation owner in Prince George's County, Maryland. The couple resided on the Young family property after their marriage. A few years later, Young's property was among those annexed by the Federal government for the new national capital, making Brent one of the first residents of the newly created City of Washington. He soon took over his father's businesses, selling sandstone to the U.S. government for the White House, U.S. Capitol, and other early construction projects in the District of Columbia and thereby becoming one of the capital's most prominent merchants.

== Mayor of City of Washington ==
In 1802 Congress officially incorporated the city, including in its incorporation a directive for a mayor to be appointed annually by the President of the United States. On June 3, 1802 Thomas Jefferson wrote to Brent, informing Brent of his intention to appoint Brent as mayor of the city. Brent replied accepting the appointment that same day: "Altho I feel great diffidence in the talents I possess for executing that duty, in a manner which may afford general satisfaction, yet feeling it a duty to contribute my feeble aid for the public service, I will venture upon its duties."

Brent was reappointed to the position seven times by Jefferson and three times by James Madison, finally relinquishing the position in June 1812. During his tenure, he essentially created the city government from the ground up — establishing markets, public schools, a police department, a fire department, and a system for taxation. In addition, since city planner Pierre L'Enfant had been dismissed before completion of his design, Brent was responsible for laying out many of the streets in the new city. In ten terms as mayor, Brent took no salary.

== Other careers ==
During his lifetime, Brent also served as Paymaster-General of the United States Army, Judge of the Orphan's Court for Washington County, and Chairman of the Board of Trustees of the Public Schools. He was the first president of the Patriotic Bank and of the Columbia Manufacturing Co.

== Brentwood Mansion ==
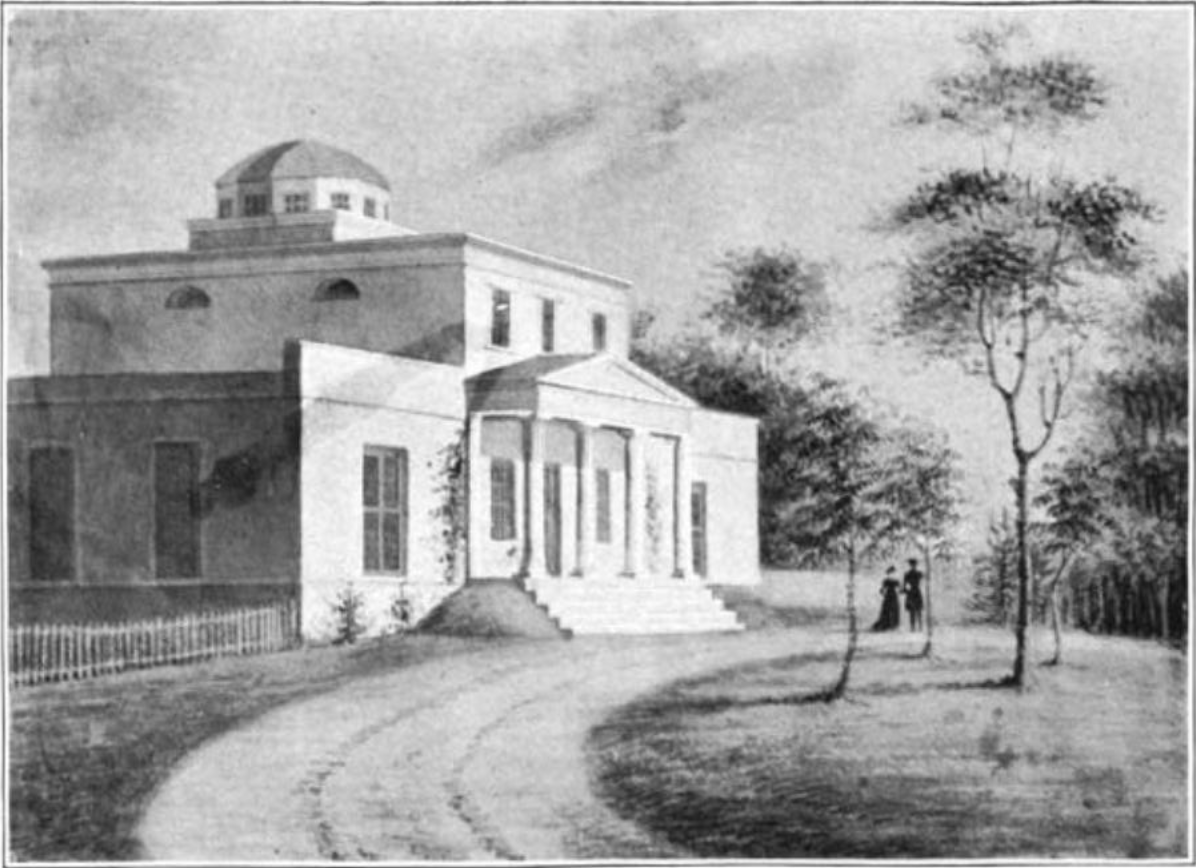
Drawing of Brentwood Mansion

Brent's home was located on the southeast corner of the present 12th Street and Maryland Avenue SW in Washington, DC, but he owned land throughout the region, including parts of Montgomery County, Maryland, and Washington County. His landholdings were largely inherited through his father's family, his mother's family (the Carrolls of Maryland), and his father-in-law.

In 1817 Brent had the Brentwood Mansion constructed in Washington County (the mansion site - Florida Ave and 6th Street NE is now part of the Gallaudet University campus in Northeast DC) as a present for his daughter Eleanor on her marriage to Congressman Joseph Pearson (Federalist - N.C.). Brentwood was designed by one of the Capitol's architects, Benjamin Henry Latrobe. The Prince George's County, Maryland, towns of Brentwood and North Brentwood and the DC neighborhood of Brentwood (which formed most of the original estate) take their names from his home.

== Legacy ==
Brent died in City of Washington, at his home on September 7, 1819, after suffering from a stroke. He was buried in a vault on the property of Brentwood Mansion but vandalism and desecration of the crypts forced the last owners of the property to re-inter the remains of Brent and his family members to Saint John the Evangelist Catholic Church Cemetery in Forest Glen, Maryland in 1915.

Robert Brent Elementary School in City of Washington is named in his honor. His son William Brent Jr. served in the Virginia House of Delegates and as charge de affairs to Argentina.

Political offices
Preceded by none	List of mayors of Washington, D.C.#Mayors of the City of Washington (1802–1871); 1802–1812	Succeeded by Daniel Rapine
