= Thomas P. Jones =

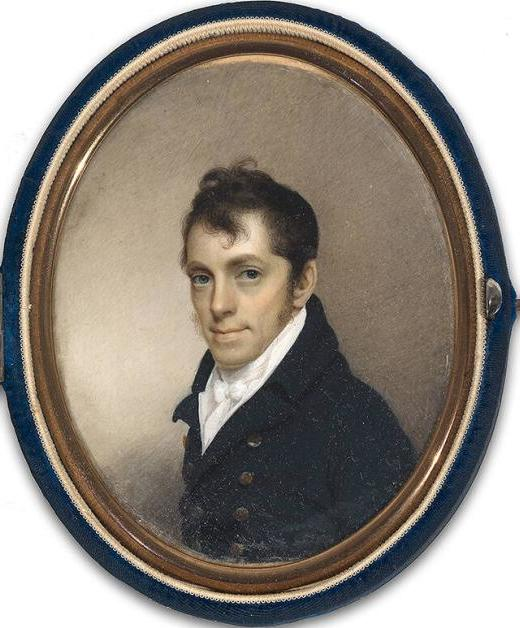
- portrait by Edward Greene Malbone
- Born: 1774; Herefordshire
- Died: 11 March 1848 (aged 73–74); Washington, D.C.

Thomas Pascal Jones (1774–March 11, 1848) was a British-born engineer and publisher in the United States of America.

== Biography ==
Born in Herefordshire in Britain in 1774, Jones emigrated to America as a youth.

In 1825 he became a cofounder as well as publisher and editor of American Mechanics Magazine.

Jones first lived in Washington, D.C., and served as superintendent and examiner of the United States Patent and Trademark Office. Later, he lived in New York City and taught at the Franklin Institute, in Philadelphia.

In 1828, Jones merged American Mechanics Magazine with the institute's existing magazine, entitling it Journal of the Franklin Institute. He remained its editor until his death in 1848. He was elected a member of the American Philosophical Society in 1831 and a Fellow of the American Academy of Arts and Sciences in 1834.

Also in 1828, he became the professor of chemistry of the Medical Department of the Columbian College, today's George Washington University School of Medicine and Health Sciences, replacing Richard Randall. In 1839 his position changed to the professor of chemistry and pharmacy, which he resigned the next year.

== Selected works ==
- New conversations on chemistry
