= Edward Cutbush =

American physician

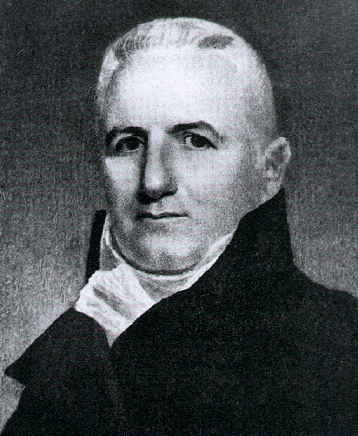
- Cutbush - c. 1835
- Born: 1772; Philadelphia, Pennsylvania
- Died: July 23, 1843 (aged 71); Geneva, New York
- Education: University of Pennsylvania 1794
- Medical career
- Profession: Physician and Educator
- Field: United States Navy

Edward Cutbush (1772 – July 23, 1843) was born in Philadelphia. He graduated from the University of Pennsylvania in 1794, where he was resident physician of the Pennsylvania Hospital from 1790 to 1794. Cutbush was surgeon general of the Pennsylvania militia during the 1794 Whiskey Rebellion.

He was an officer and a surgeon in the United States Navy and was commissioned into office in 1799. Cutbush has been called the father of American naval medicine. He resigned from the Navy in 1829, after 30 years of service. During 1826, he was a professor of chemistry at Columbian College in the District of Columbia. In 1834, he relocated to Geneva, New York, where he founded Geneva Medical College, currently known as State University of New York Upstate Medical University. During his tenure there, he served as the first dean and professor of chemistry.
