= Thomas H. Patterson =

U.S. Navy admiral (born 1820–1889)

Thomas Harmon Patterson
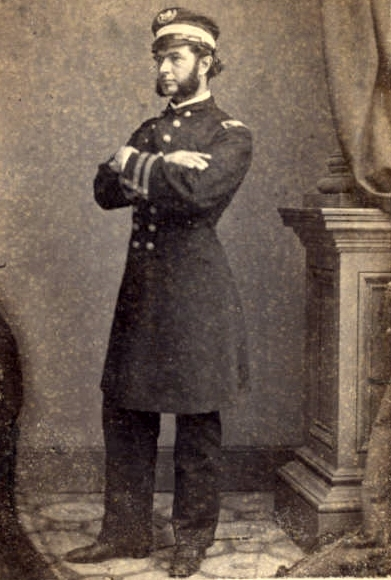
- Captain Thomas H. Patterson, ca. 1862

Commander of the Asiatic Squadron
- In office August 12, 1877 – September 11, 1880
- Preceded by: Jonathan Young
- Succeeded by: John M. B. Clitz

Personal details
- Born: May 10, 1820 New Orleans, Louisiana, U.S.
- Died: April 9, 1889 (aged 68) Washington, D.C., U.S.
- Spouse: Maria Montresor Wainwright (m. 1847; died 1881)
- Parent(s): Daniel Todd Patterson; George Ann Pollock Patterson

Military service
- Allegiance: United States of America; Union
- Branch/service: United States Navy
- Rank: Rear admiral
- Commands: Chocura, Currituck, James Adger, Richmond

Thomas Harmon Patterson (May 10, 1820 – April 9, 1889) was a rear admiral in the United States Navy.

== Early life ==
Patterson was born in New Orleans, Louisiana, on May 10, 1820. He was the second son of Commodore Daniel Todd Patterson (1786–1839), a War of 1812 U.S. Navy hero, and George Ann (née Pollock) Patterson (1787–1851). Among his siblings were Carlile Pollock Patterson (superintendent of the United States Coast Survey); Eliza Catherine Patterson, who married George Mifflin Bache Sr. (brother of Alexander Dallas Bache), and George Ann Patterson, who married fellow Naval officer David Dixon Porter.

His maternal grandparents were George Pollock and Catherine (née Yates) Pollock and his paternal grandparents were John Patterson and Catherine (née Livingston) Patterson. His grandfather was the younger brother of Walter Patterson, the first British colonial Governor of Prince Edward Island. Through his paternal grandmother he was a great-grandson of Robert Livingston, the 3rd Lord of Livingston Manor.

== Career ==
Patterson saw action in the American Civil War and later served as commander of the Asiatic Squadron (1877–1880). While in this latter post, he participated in the lengthy 1879 visit of former president and general Ulysses S. Grant to Japan at the conclusion of Grant's around-the-world tour that started in 1878.

Patterson's commands included Chocura, Currituck and James Adger. Richmond served as his flagship in the Asiatic Squadron. From 1873 to 1876 he commanded the Washington Navy Yard, as his father had done in 1836–1839. On January 2, 1868, Patterson was elected as a member of the Military Order of the Loyal Legion of the United States.

Patterson retired from the U.S. Navy in 1883.

== Personal life ==
On June 5, 1847, Patterson was married to Maria Montresor Wainwright (1823–1881). Maria was the daughter of U.S. Marine Corps Colonel Robert Dewar Wainwright and Maria Montresor (née Auchmuty) Wainwright, the sister of U.S. Naval officer Richard Wainwright, and cousin of Commander Jonathan Mayhew Wainwright. They were the parents of one daughter and three sons who survived to adulthood, including:

- Robert Harmon Patterson.
- Thomas Wainwright Patterson (1854–1858), who died in childhood.
- Daniel Walter Patterson (1858–1912)
- Capt. Samuel Achmuty Wainwright Patterson (1859–1933), USN, who commanded the Great White Fleet battleship USS Kentucky (BB-6) in 1905. He married Margaret Sprague Davis (1860–1936), daughter of General William Watts Hart Davis, in 1886.
- Georgeanne Pollock Patterson.

After a long and painful illness, Patterson died on April 9, 1889, at his residence, 2100 G Street in Washington, D.C. His remains were interred in the Wainwright vault of Congressional Cemetery, with his wife, father-in-law, and other Wainwright relatives. His father and mother are also buried in Congressional Cemetery but under a separate Patterson monument.

Military offices
Preceded by Jonathan Young	Commander, Asiatic Squadron; 12 August 1877–11 September 1880	Succeeded by John M. B. Clitz
