= Robert Little (minister) =

English Unitarian minister (1762-1827)

Rev. Robert Little
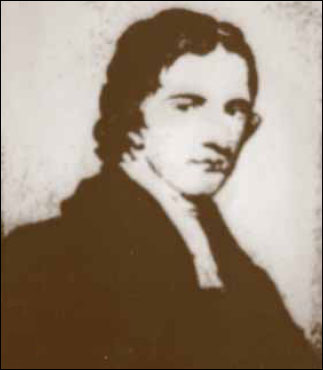
- Rev. Little - About 1800
- Born: 1762; England
- Died: October 5, 1827 (aged 64–65); Washington, D.C.
- Title: Reverend

Religious life
- Religion: Unitarian

Senior posting
- Post: Pastor, First Unitarian Church
- Period in office: 1821–1827

Robert Little (1762 – October 5, 1827) was a Unitarian minister. He was born in England in 1762. He immigrated to the United States in 1819 because of poor health and religious restrictions in England against all churches except the Church of England. He was the first pastor of First Unitarian Church in Washington, D.C., and was instrumental in its formation in 1821. He served in that position until 1827 when he died unexpectedly.
