= Joseph Pearson (politician) =

American politician

Joseph Pearson (1776 – October 27, 1834) was a congressional representative from North Carolina.

== Biography ==
Born in Rowan County, North Carolina, in 1776; completed preparatory studies; studied law; was admitted to the bar and commenced practice in Salisbury, North Carolina; member of the State house of commons from Rowan county in 1804 and 1805; elected as a Federalist to the Eleventh, Twelfth, and Thirteenth Congresses (March 4, 1809 – March 3, 1815). He was elected a member of the American Antiquarian Society in 1814. Pearson died in Salisbury, N.C., October 27, 1834.

Joseph Pearson's father was Richmond Pearson, born in Dinwiddie county, Va., who at the age of nineteen years came to North Carolina and settled in the forks of the Yadkin river, late of Davie county when a part of Rowan county. When the war of the Revolution broke out he was a Lieutenant in Captain Samuel Bryan's company. After the Declaration of Independence, at the first muster which occurred, he requested someone whom he could rely to load their guns. When Captain Bryan came on the ground he ordered all the men into ranks. Pearson refused and tendered his commission to Bryan, whereupon he ordered him under arrest. This was resisted, and he was told that the men had their guns loaded. They then came to a parley, and it was agreed by the crowd, as matters stood, that Bryan and Pearson, on a fixed day, should settle this national affair by a fair fist fight, and whichever whipped, the company should belong to the side of the conqueror, whether Whig or Tory. At the appointed time and place the parties met, and the Lieutenant proved to be the victor. From this time the Fork company was for liberty, and Bryan's crowd, on Dutchman's creek, were Loyalists. The anecdote illustrates by what slight circumstances events of this period were affected. When Cornwallis came south, Pearson, with his company, endeavored to harass his advance. He was present at Cowan's Ford on February 1, 1781, where General William Lee Davidson fell in attempting to resist the passage of the British. Captain Pearson was a successful merchant and an enterprising planter. He died in 1819, leaving three sons and one daughter: 1st, Jesse A.; 2d, Joseph (the subject of this entry); 3d, Richmond; and 4th, Elizabeth Pearson.

While in Congress, Pearson fought a duel with Representative John G. Jackson, of Virginia, and on the second fire wounded his opponent in the hip. Jackson resigned due to the injuries he suffered that day.

== Personal and family life ==
According to this History of Western North Carolina, Joseph Pearson married three times. By his first wife, Miss McLinn, he had no issue. By the second, Miss Ellen Brent, daughter of Robert Brent the first mayor of Washington, D.C., he had two daughters—one, the wife of Robert Walsh, Esqr., of Philadelphia—the other, the wife of Lieutenant Farley, of the U.S. Navy. Miss Brent brought to the marriage the mansion and property known as Brentwood Mansion, which, when she died, remained with Pearson. By the third wife (Miss Catherine Worthington, of Georgetown), he left four children. One of these, Elizabeth, married Carlile Pollock Patterson. Another, Josephine, married Peter Augustus Jay, Jr., a grandson of Supreme Court Justice John Jay.

Pearson's last wife, Catherine, who survived him by 34 years and lived to 1868, was a daughter of Dr. Charles Worthington, a descendant of Capt. John Worthington of Annapolis (1650–1701). Dr. Worthington, who participated with the Maryland Militia in the Revolution as a doctor or medic, was born in Georgetown prior to the creation of the District of Columbia, and is said to have been so enamored of Revolutionary-era-18th century clothing styles that he eccentrically continued to wear clothes in that style into the early 19th century, long after they had become old-fashioned. He raised his family in Worthington House, built circa 1798, a historic and gracious Federal-style Georgetown manse that still stands at 3425 Prospect Street, N.W., Washington D.C., (it was the long-time Washington residence of Rhode Island senator Claiborne Pell). Dr. Charles Worthington purchased the home in 1810 and named the estate "Quality Hill," but it soon came to be called Worthington House. Reflecting the cultural history of Georgetown from its earliest origins as a prosperous port city, the house has eight bedrooms, two bathrooms, expansive public rooms, and a large garden. It was listed in 1972 on the National Register of Historical Places. Senator Pell sold Worthington House in 2004 for almost $4 million (~$6.35 million in 2024).

Shortly after the end of the Civil War, in response to requests from newly emancipated African-Americans for establishment of a new Episcopal Church, Catherine Pearson, a member of St. John's Episcopal, Lafayette Square, donated some of her inherited Worthington land—a lot on 23rd Street, NW, between G and H -- for a new church. Secretary of War Edwin M. Stanton directed that the Union Army Chapel at Kalorama Hospital be moved to the site and refurbished, and St. Mary's Episcopal Church, came into existence. Catherine Pearson died a year after making the donation.

A daughter of Joseph Pearson and Catherine Worthington, Elizabeth Pearson, married Carlile Pollock Patterson, and Mr. & Mrs. Patterson hosted many social events in Washington at the Brentwood Mansion during the Administration of President Ulysses S. Grant. A descendant (Edward Sisson) of the family that owned the mansion throughout its existence has posted a collection of paintings, drawings, photos, and histories of the mansion on-line in an "album" titled "Worthington House and Brentwood Mansion" on a Mac Web Gallery site: http://gallery.mac.com/sissoed#gallery. The Frick Art Reference Library (http://www.frick.org/) has drawings, paintings, and perhaps photographs (although none appear to be accessible on-line as of late 2007). Catherine Worthington Pearson, her father, her daughter Eliza Patterson and son-in-law C.P. Patterson, and many members of her family (but not her husband, who died while on a trip to North Carolina and was buried there) are buried in the Worthington vault at Oak Hill Cemetery, Washington D.C..

Joseph Pearson and Catherine Worthington are ancestors of noted American author Susan Mary Alsop (born Susan Mary Jay) (obituary at https://www.washingtonpost.com/wp-dyn/articles/A13830-2004Aug18.html). Susan Mary Jay's parents were Peter Augustus Jay (III) & Susan Alexander McCook; her paternal grandparents Augustus Jay & Emily Astor Kane; Augustus Jay's parents were Peter Augustus Jay (II) and Josephine Pearson, daughter of Joseph Pearson and Catherine Worthington (Roberts mistakenly inserts the name Elizabeth instead of Catherine). Susan Mary Jay married, first, William Patten; after his 1960 death, she married Joseph Alsop V.

== See also ==
- Eleventh United States Congress
- Twelfth United States Congress
- Thirteenth United States Congress
- U.S. Congress Biographical Directory entry
- Brown, Stephen W. "Satisfaction at Bladensburg: The Pearson-Jackson Duel of 1809." North Carolina Historical Review 58 (Winter 1981): 23-43.

U.S. House of Representatives
Preceded by Evan S. Alexander	Member of the U.S. House of Representatives from North Carolina's 10th congressional district 1809–1815	Succeeded by William C. Love
