= List of burials at the Congressional Cemetery =

Coordinates: 38°52′52″N 76°58′38″W

This is a list of notable individuals who were buried at the Congressional Cemetery in Washington, D.C., as well as those who are memorialized by cenotaphs. In particular, many U.S. senators and U.S. representatives are memorialized by cenotaphs at the cemetery.

Specialized terminology is used on this list. The term cenotaph includes not only monuments that are "empty tombs" or where the body is buried elsewhere, but also the graves of Congressmen who died in office which are marked by the particular style of cenotaph designed by Benjamin Latrobe for the Cemetery. "Congressman" refers to any U.S. senator or representative. A range/site listing, e.g. R31/S44, after a name gives the location of the grave or cenotaph according to the cemetery's location system.

== Buried with a cenotaph ==
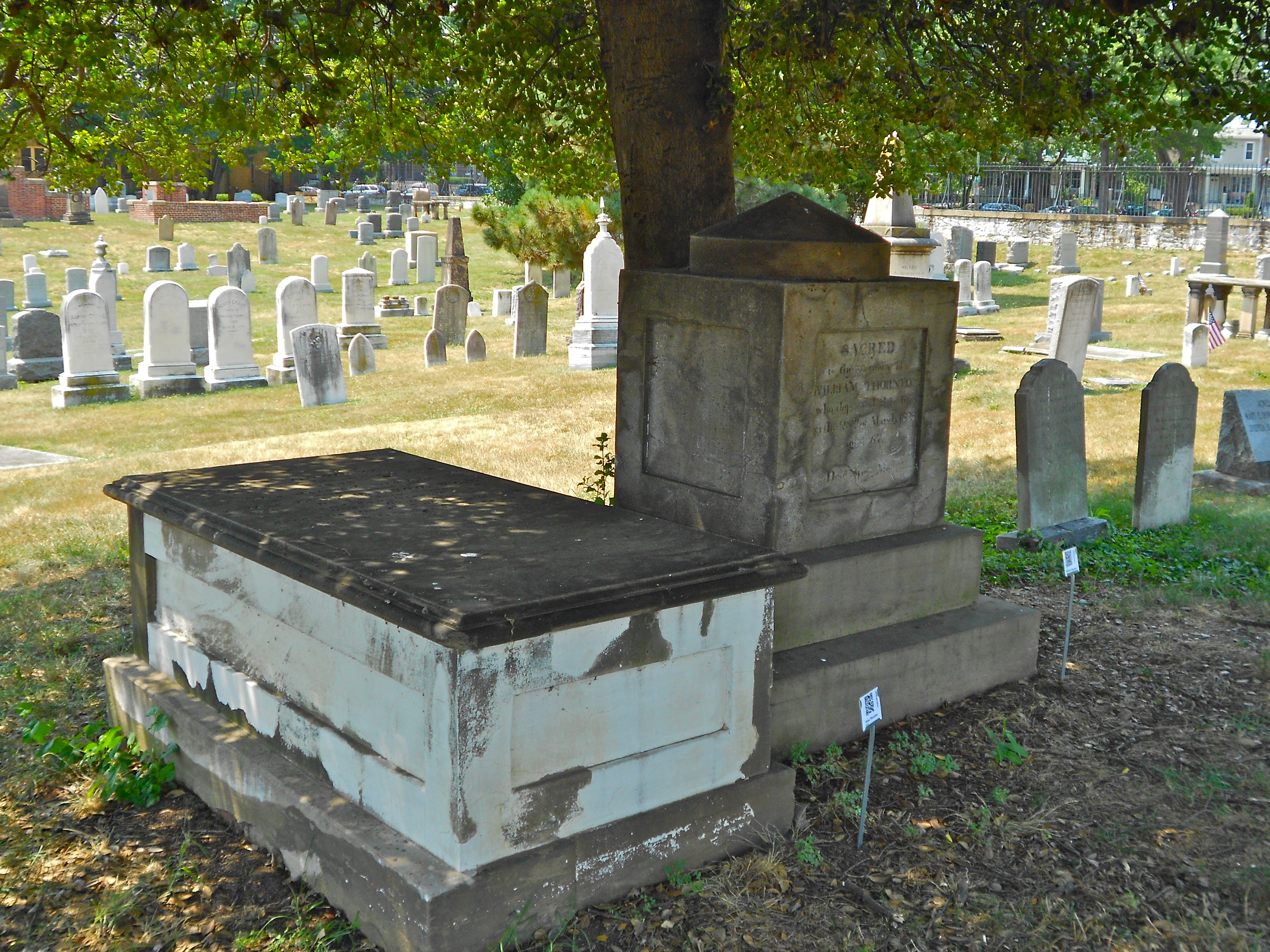
Graves of Anna and William Thornton

- William Thornton (1759–1828), first Architect of the Capitol, is the only person who did not serve as a congressman to be honored with one of the cenotaphs designed by Benjamin Henry Latrobe at the Congressional Cemetery.
- Goldsmith Bailey (1823–1862), Representative – Massachusetts. R59/S143.
- Thomas Henry Bayly (1810–1859), Representative – Virginia. R60/S122.
- William Lee Ball (1781–1824), Representative – Virginia, War of 1812 soldier. R29/S37-38.

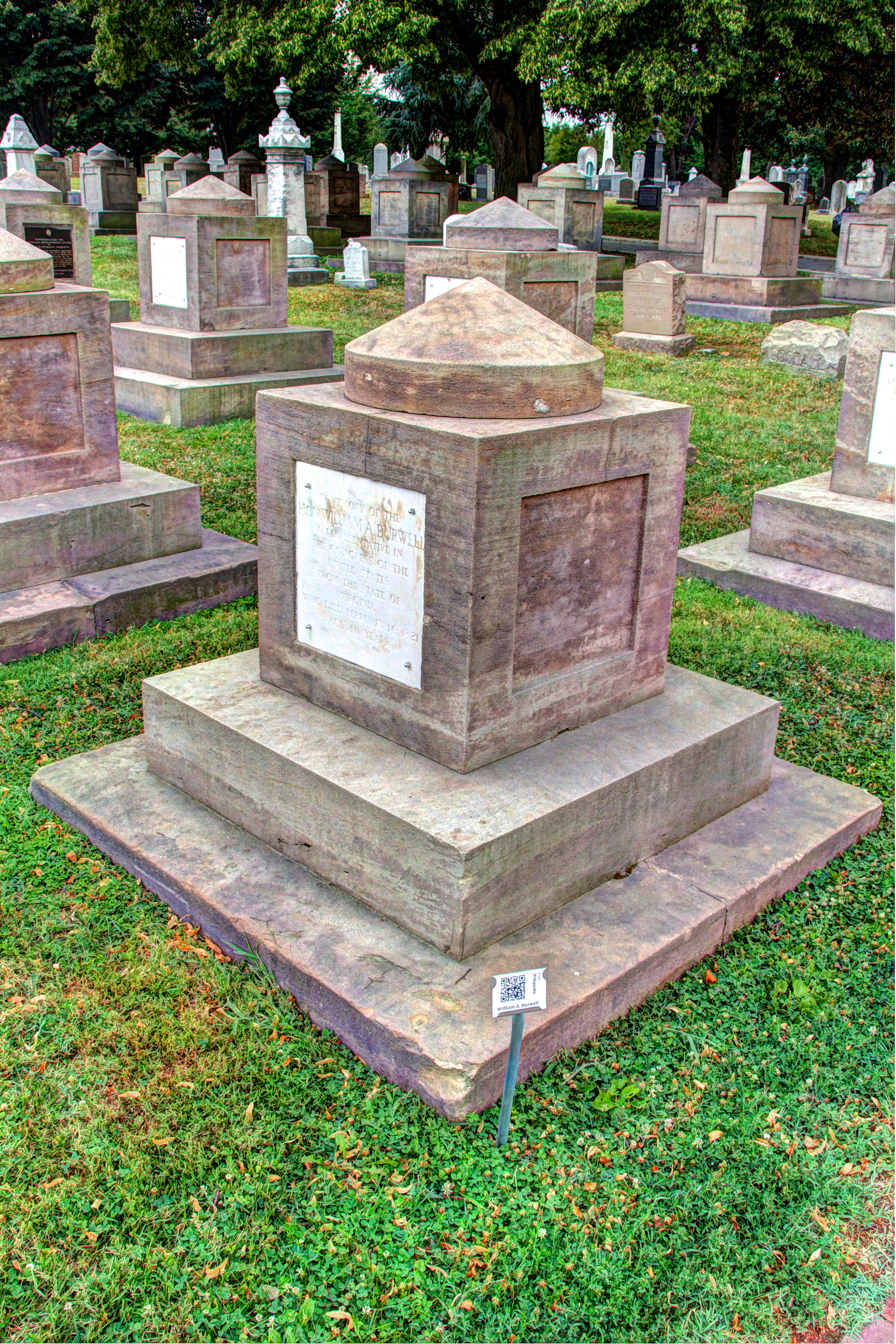
William A. Burwell

- James Blair (1786–1834), Representative – South Carolina. R30/S72.
- Theodorick Bland (1741–1790), Representative – Virginia; the first to die in office, reinterred 1828 with cenotaph. R31/S48.
- Pierre Bossier (1797–1844), Representative Louisiana. R54/S123.
- Elijah Brigham (1751–1816), Representative Massachusetts. R30/S14.
- James Burrill, Jr. (1772–1820), Senator Massachusetts. R29/S31-32.
- Silas M. Burroughs (1810–1860), Representative New York. R60/S66.
- William A. Burwell (1780–1821), Representative – Virginia; private secretary to Thomas Jefferson. R56/S102.
- Timothy J. Carter (1800–1838), Representative Maine. R30/S54-56.
- Levi Casey (1752–1807), Representative – South Carolina; Brigadier General of the South Carolina Militia and American Continental Army. R29/S63.
- Warren R. Davis (1793–1835), Representative – South Carolina. R30/S67.
- John Dawson (US politician) (1762–1814), Representative Virginia. R30/S11.
- John Bennett Dawson (1798–1845), Representative Louisiana. R30/S11-12.
- Philip Doddridge (1773–1832), Representative Virginia. R29/S65.
- George Coke Dromgoole (1797–1847), Representative Virginia. R55/S111.
- Josiah Evans (1786–1858), Senator South Carolina. R60/S96.
- Henry Frick (1795–1844), Representative Pennsylvania. R54/S117.
- John Gaillard (1765–1826), Senator – South Carolina. R29/S40.
- James Gillespie (1747–1805), Revolutionary War soldier, Representative – North Carolina, reinterred at Congressional Cemetery 1893 at R60/S58. Cenotaph at R31/S59.
- Francis Jacob Harper (1800–1837), Representative Pennsylvania, died before taking office. Reinterred at Congressional Cemetery 1848. R55/S101.
- Albert Galliton Harrison (1800–1839), Representative Missouri. R54/S132.
- Nathaniel Hazard (1776–1820), Representative Rhode Island. R29/S28.
- George Holcombe (1786–1828), Representative New Jersey. R31/S50.
- James Jackson (1757–1820), Representative, Senator, Governor Georgia. R29/S60.
- Charles Clement Johnston (1795–1832), Representative Virginia. R29/S48.
- James Jones (1769–1801), Representative Georgia. R29/S56.
- Joab Lawler (1796–1838), Representative Alabama. R31/S54.
- Joseph Lawrence (1786–1842), Representative Pennsylvania. R56/S137.
- Francis Malbone (1759–1809), Representative, Senator Rhode Island, died on the steps of the Capitol. R25/S2.
- Felix Grundy McConnell (1809–1846), Representative Alabama. R55/S114.
- Jeremiah McLene (1767–1837), Representative – Ohio, Major General of militia in the American Revolution, Ohio Secretary of State. R31/S63.
- James McLeod - Congressional Medal of Honor recipient
- George Edward Mitchell (1781–1832), Representative Maryland. R29/S54.
- George Mumford (d. 1818), Representative North Carolina. R29/S19.
- James Noble (1785–1831), Senator – Indiana. R29/S46.
- William Pinkney (1764–1822), Representative, Senator Maryland, Attorney General. R29/S36.
- Thomas D. Singleton (d. 1833), Representative South Carolina. R30/S51.
- Jesse Slocumb (1780–1820), Representative North Carolina. R29/S29.
- John Smilie (1741–1812), Representative – Pennsylvania. R30/S10.
- Alexander Smyth (1765–1830), lawyer, soldier, Representative – Virginia. R29/S44.
- Samuel L. Southard (1787–1842), Senator, Governor New Jersey. R55/S140.
- Richard Stanford (1767–1816), Representative North Carolina. R29/S15.

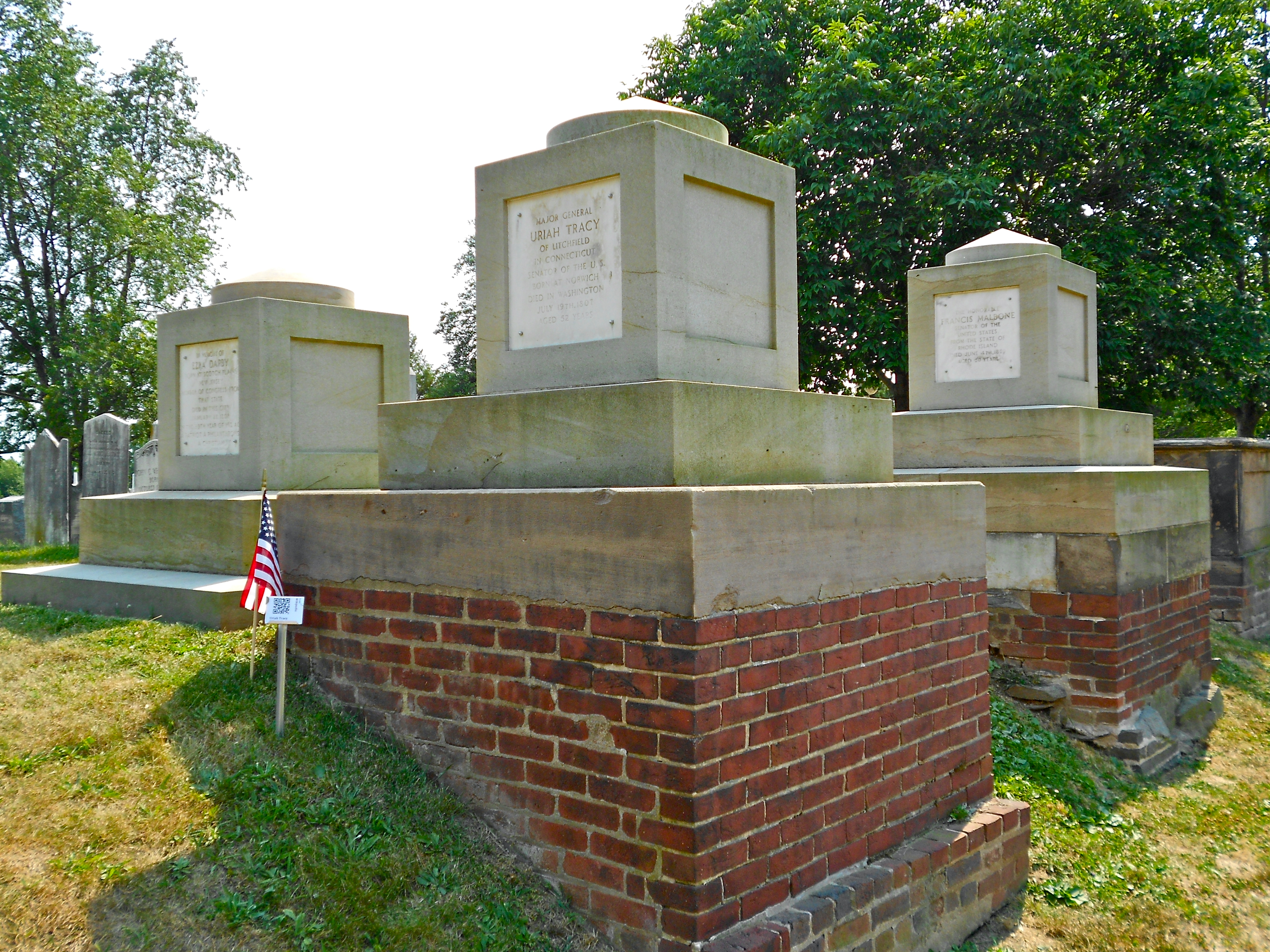
Uriah Tracy

- William Taylor (1788–1846), Representative Virginia. R54/S120.
- Benjamin Thompson (1798–1852), Representative Massachusetts. R54/S154.
- Uriah Tracy (1755–1807), Representative and Senator – Connecticut, first Congressman buried in Congressional Cemetery. R24/S1.
- William A. Trimble (1786–1821), Senator Ohio. R29/S34.
- William Upham (1792–1853), Senator – Vermont, member of the Vermont House of Representatives, attorney. Burial with granite stone in a form similar to a cenotaph at R55/S163.
- David Walker (1763–1820), Representative Kentucky. R29/S21.

== Members of Congress buried without a cenotaph ==
- Joseph Anderson (1757–1837), Senator – Tennessee, Comptroller of the U.S. Treasury. R31/S44.
- Philip P. Barbour (1783–1841), Representative – Virginia, Speaker of the United States House of Representatives, Associate Justice of the Supreme Court
- Thomas Blount (1759–1812), Representative – North Carolina, Revolutionary War prisoner of war. R25/S8.
- John Edward Bouligny (1824–1864), Representative – Louisiana; the only member of the Louisiana congressional delegation to retain his seat after the state seceded during the Civil War. Unmarked grave at R37/S104.
- Lemuel Jackson Bowden (1815–1864), Senator – Virginia; represented Virginia during the Civil War. R60/S60.

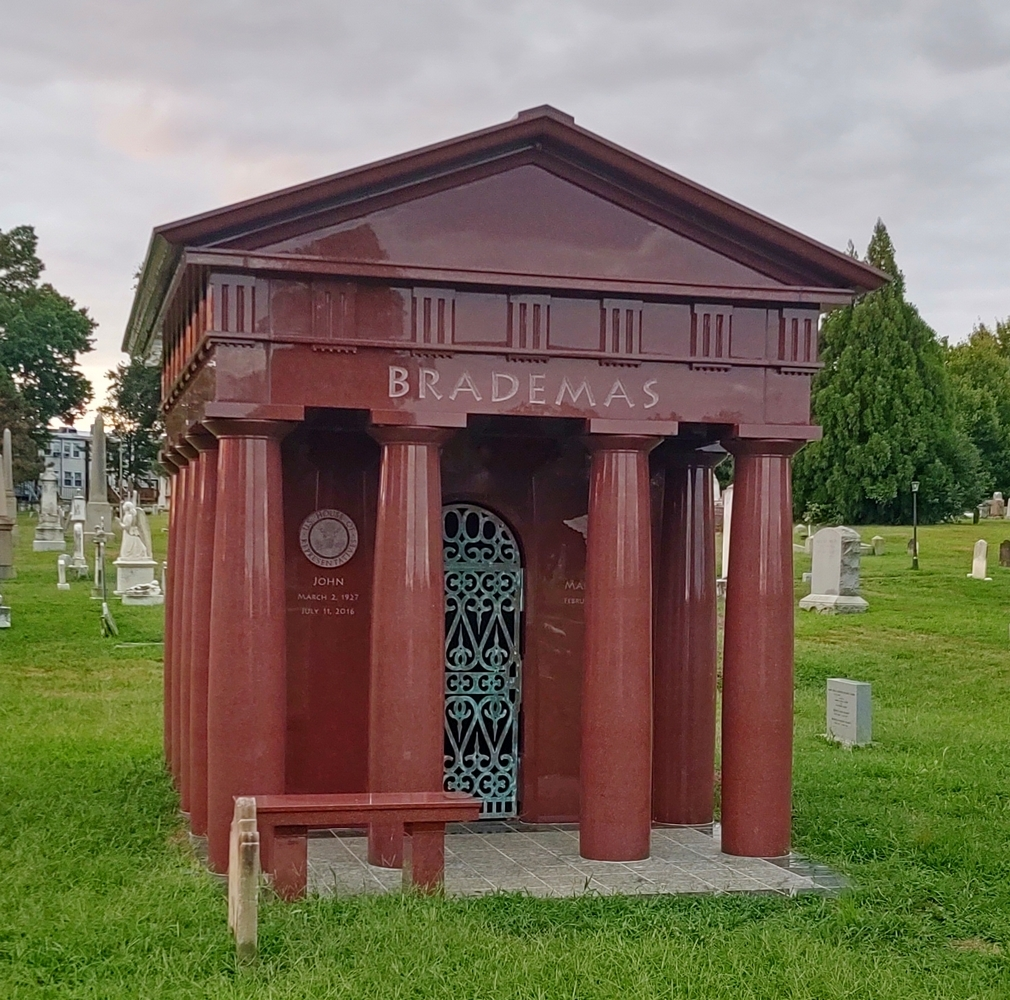
John Brademas Mausoleum at Congressional Cemetery

- John Brademas (1927–2016), U.S. Congressman (Indiana), NYU, President and Chair, Federal Reserve Bank of New York
- Jacob Broom, Representative – Pennsylvania. R 95/S95
- Daniel Azro Ashley Buck. Representative – Vermont. R41/S78
- Charles Case (1817–1883), Representative Indiana. R67/S287.
- Thomas Hartley Crawford (1786–1863), Representative Pennsylvania, Commissioner of Indian Affairs, Judge, no cenotaph. R39/S75.
- John Dawson (1762–1814), Representative – Virginia
- William Pope Duval (1784–1854), Representative Kentucky, R46/S4.
- John Forsyth (1780–1841), Representative and Senator – Georgia, Governor of Georgia, U.S. Secretary of State
- Elbridge Gerry (1744–1814), U.S. Vice President, congressman, and the only signer of the Declaration of Independence buried in Washington, D.C. R29/S10.
- William Helmick (1817–1888), Representative Ohio. R82/S348.

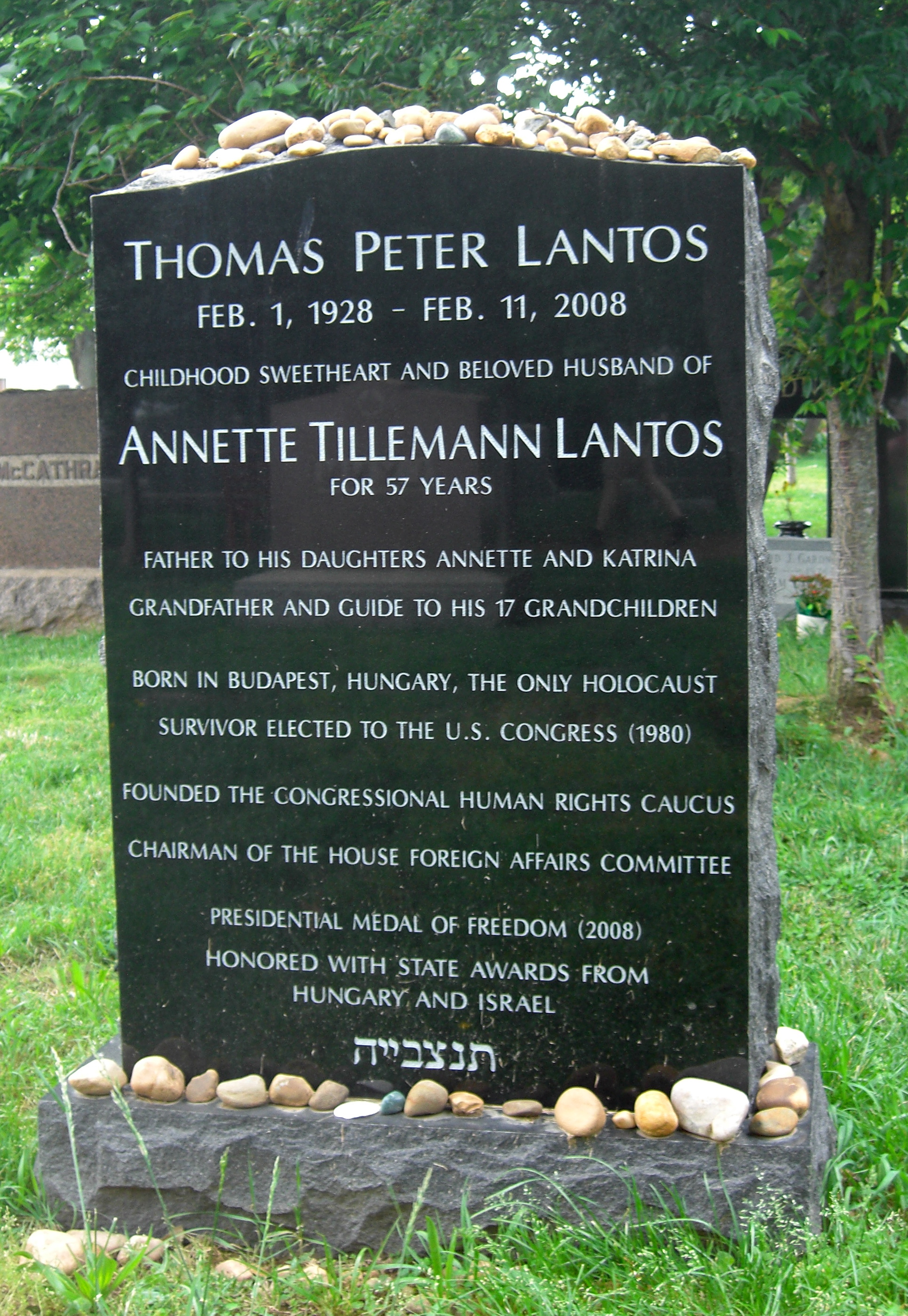
Congressman Tom Lantos's grave in Congressional Cemetery, Washington, D.C.

- Daniel Hiester (1747–1804), Representative – Pennsylvania. R30/S69.
- Charles West Kendall (1828–1914), Representative – Nevada, California State Assemblyman, attorney
- Tom Lantos (1928–2008), Representative – California; Chairman of the House Foreign Affairs Committee and the only Holocaust survivor elected to Congress
- Pat Schroeder (1940-2023), Representative - Colorado; The first woman elected to represent Colorado in Congress.
- Stephen Solarz (1940-2010), Representative - New York.
- Charles H. Upton (1812–1877), Representative – Virginia, consul to Switzerland

== Senior Union Civil War officers ==
Army

- Henry Washington Benham
- William H. Emory
- Andrew A. Humphreys (1810–1883)
- Robert B. Mitchell
- Alfred Pleasonton
- Augustus Pleasonton
- Albin Francisco Schoepf
- Joseph G. Totten

Navy

- John J. Almy
- Louis M. Goldsborough
- Thomas H. Patterson
- Richard Wainwright

== Mayors and other Chief Executives of Washington, DC ==
- William Thornton (1759–1828), physician, painter, designer and first Architect of the Capitol and superintendent of the U.S. Patent Office, 5th Commissioner of the Federal City (1794-1802)
- William Cranch (1769-1855) - 7th Commissioner of the Federal City (1801), Chief Judge of the United States Circuit Court of the District of Columbia (1806-1855).
- Daniel Rapine - 2nd Mayor of the City of Washington
- Benjamin G. Orr - 4th Mayor of the City of Washington
- Samuel Nicholas Smallwood (1772-1884) - 5th and 7th Mayor of the City of Washington; one of 8 men who helped establish the cemetery, signed the article incorporating it and helped finance and erect a wall around it.
- Roger C. Weightman (1787-1876) - 8th Mayor of the City of Washington
- Joseph Gales (1786-1860) - 9th Mayor of the City of Washington
- William Winston Seaton - 13th Mayor of the City of Washington
- John Walker Maury - 14th Mayor of the City of Washington
- John T. Towers - 15th Mayor of the City of Washington
- James G. Berret (1815–1901), 18th Mayor of the City of Washington. Was forced to resign at the outbreak of the Civil War
- Sayles Jenks Bowen (1813-1896) 20th Mayor of the City of Washington.
- Marion Barry (1936–2014), served four terms as mayor of Washington, DC.

== National Underground Railroad Network honorees ==
- Dr. William Boyd (1820-1884) - A conductor on the underground railroad
- John Dean - Attorney who tested the Fugitive Slave Act
- David Aiken Hall - lawyer to freedom seekers, including the crew and slaves of the Pearl
- Hannibal Hamlin - Founder and first president of the National Freedman's Relief Association of DC, (Cousin of the Vice president of the same name)

== Others ==
- Alexander Dallas Bache (1806–1867), Superintendent of the United States Coast Survey, Charter member National Academy of Sciences. R32/S194.
- Lucy (died 1862) and Ann Bell (died 1873), mother and sister of Daniel Bell, who attempted to free his family in the Pearl incident of 1848.
- Henry Washington Benham (1813–1884), Union Army general
- Mathew Brady (1822–1896), Civil War photographer
- Jacob Jennings Brown (1775–1828), commanding general U.S. Army, hero of the War of 1812
- Joseph Goldsborough Bruff (1804–1889), architect and topographer
- John Carrington (1871–1939), Fire Chief of Washington, D.C., hero of the Knickerbocker Theatre disaster
- Flora Adams Darling (1840–1910), Founder of the United States Daughters of 1812 and the General Society Daughters of the Revolution 1776
- Art Devlin (1879–1948), Major League Baseball Player
- Owen Thomas Edgar (1831–1929), longest surviving Mexican–American War veteran
- William H. Emory (1811–1887), Army engineer, Western explorer, Civil War general
- Henry Stephen Fox (1791–1846), British diplomat
- Mary Fuller (1888–1973), silent film actress
- Barbara Gittings (1932–2007), LGBT rights activist
- Jim Graham (1945-2017), member of the DC City Council
- William Montrose Graham, Jr. (1834–1916), Major General in the U.S. Army during the Spanish–American War
- George Hadfield, architect; superintendent of construction for the U.S. Capitol
- Archibald Henderson (1783–1859), the longest serving Commandant of the U.S. Marine Corps
- Charles Frederick Henningsen (1815–1877), author, adventurer, filibuster, general
- David Herold (1842–1865), conspirator of the Abraham Lincoln assassination
- J. Edgar Hoover (1895–1972), FBI Director
- Robertson Howard (1847–1899), attorney, editor for West Publishing, and founder of Pi Kappa Alpha fraternity
- Andrew A. Humphreys (1810–1883), Army Engineer, Civil War general, prominent scientist
- Samuel Humphreys (1778–1846), naval architect known as Chief Constructor of the Navy
- Adelaide Johnson (1859–1955), sculptor, social reformer
- Frank Kameny (1925–2011), LGBT rights activist
- Horatio King (1811–1897), U.S. Postmaster General
- Alain LeRoy Locke (1885–1954), intellectual co-founder of the Harlem Renaissance, chair of the Department of Philosophy at Howard University, and the first African American Rhodes scholar
- Belva Ann Lockwood (1830–1917), first woman attorney permitted to practice before the U.S. Supreme Court
- Joseph Lovell (1788–1836), Surgeon General of the U.S. Army
- Alexander Macomb, Jr. (1782–1841), War of 1812 Hero, Commanding General of the Army and namesake of Macomb County and Macomb Township, Michigan; Macomb, Illinois and Macomb Mountain in New York
- Leonard Matlovich (1943–1988), gay-rights activist and Air Force veteran
- Edward Maynard (1813–1891), prominent Washington, D.C. dentist and firearms innovator
- Benjamin F. McAwee (1838-1918), Civil War Congressional Medal of Honor Recipient
- John G. Merritt (1837-1892), Civil War Congressional Medal of Honor Recipient
- Robert Mills (1781–1855), architect and designer of the Washington Monument
- Alice Lee Moqué (1861–1919), suffragist, traveler, author
- Robert Adam Mosbacher (1927–2010), U.S. Secretary of Commerce
- John T. Newton (1793–1857), U.S. naval officer
- Joseph Nicollet (1786–1843), mathematician and explorer who mapped the upper Mississippi River; namesake of City of Nicollet, County of Nicollet and Nicollet Island in Minnesota.
- Daniel Patterson (1786–1831), U.S. Navy commodore
- Thomas H. Patterson (1820–1889), U.S. Navy rear admiral
- William Pinkney (1764–1822), U.S. and Maryland Attorney General, Mayor of Annapolis, statesman and diplomat
- Alfred Pleasonton (1824–1897), Union Army general
- Stephen Pleasonton (1776–1855), saving priceless early government documents during the burning of Washington in 1814
- James W. Pumphrey (1832–1906), livery stable owner who rented a horse to John Wilkes Booth, used to escape Ford's Theatre
- Push-Ma-Ta-Ha (c. 1760 – 1824), Native American (Choctaw) chief
- Cokie Roberts (1943–2019), ABC News Journalist and daughter of Hale Boggs.
- John Philip Sousa (1854–1932), composer of many noted military and patriotic marches and conductor of the U.S. Marine Band
- Chief Taza (c. 1849 – 1876), Apache chief
  - His wife Anna Thornton (1775?–1865)
- Thomas Tingey (1750–1829), U.S. Navy commodore
- John Payne Todd, son of Dolley Madison, stepson of President James Madison. R41/S230.
- Clyde Tolson (1900–1975), associate director of the FBI. R20/S156.
- Joseph Gilbert Totten (1788–1864), military officer, longtime Army Chief of Engineers, regent of the Smithsonian Institution, cofounder of the National Academy of Sciences and namesake of Fort Totten in Washington, D.C.
- William Wirt (1772–1834), U.S. Attorney General, member of the Virginia House of Delegates, author
- Sidney M. Wolfe (1937-2024), physician, co-founder and director of Public Citizen's Health Research Group. R31.5/S216.
- William P. Wood (1820–1904), first head of the United States Secret Service

== Temporary interments ==
- John Quincy Adams, President, Senator, and Representative, interred in the Public Vault in 1848. Also has a cenotaph.
- Louisa Catherine Adams, First Lady, interred in the Causten Vault in 1852.
- George Clinton, Vice President, buried in 1812, reinterred in Kingston, New York in 1908. R31/S7.
- William Henry Harrison, President, interred in the Public Vault in 1841.
- James Lent (1782–1833), Representative New York, cenotaph and burial, later reinterred in New York. R29/S68.
- John Linn (1763–1821), Representative New Jersey, cenotaph only. R57/S105.
- Dolley Madison, First Lady, interred in the Public Vault 1849–51, and in the Causten Vault for another 6 years
- John Aaron Rawlins, Civil War General and U.S. Secretary of War, buried in 1869 and later moved to Arlington National Cemetery
- Zachary Taylor, President, interred in the Public Vault in 1850.
- Abel P. Upshur (1790–1844), lawyer, Secretary of the Navy, Secretary of State, died in the USS Princeton disaster of 1844

== Cenotaph memorials without interment ==
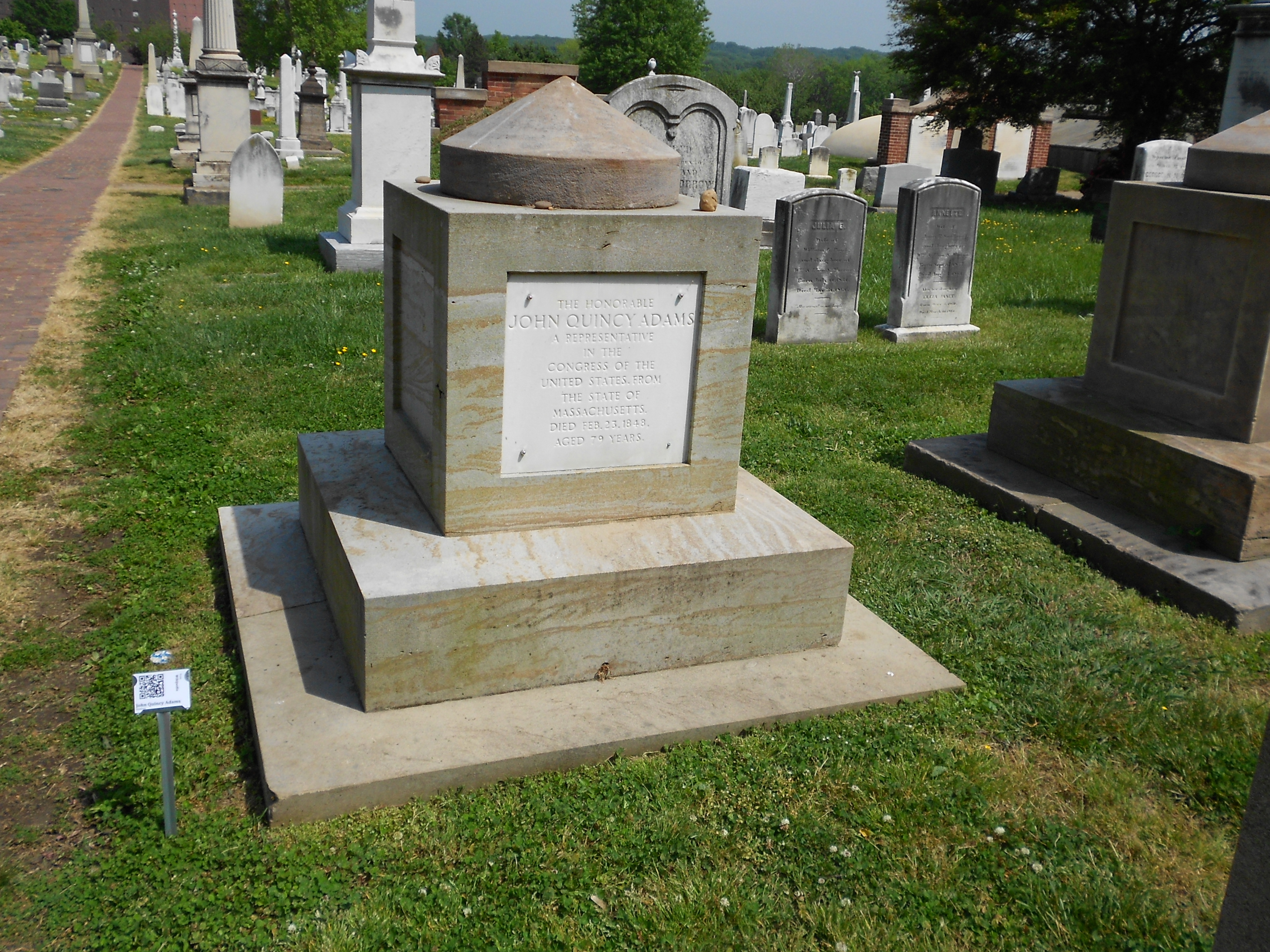
John Quincy Adams

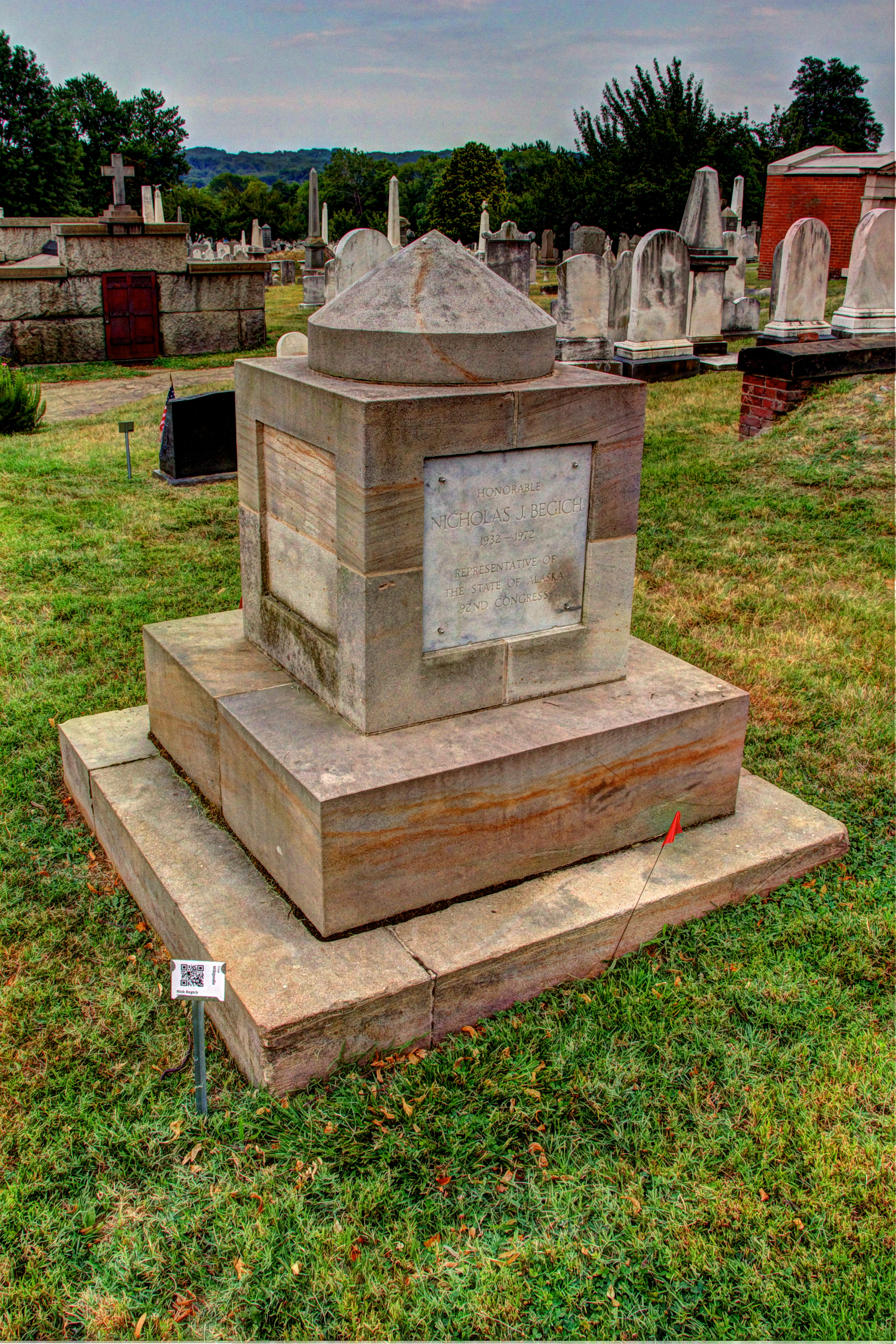
Cenotaph shared by Nicholas Begich and Hale Boggs

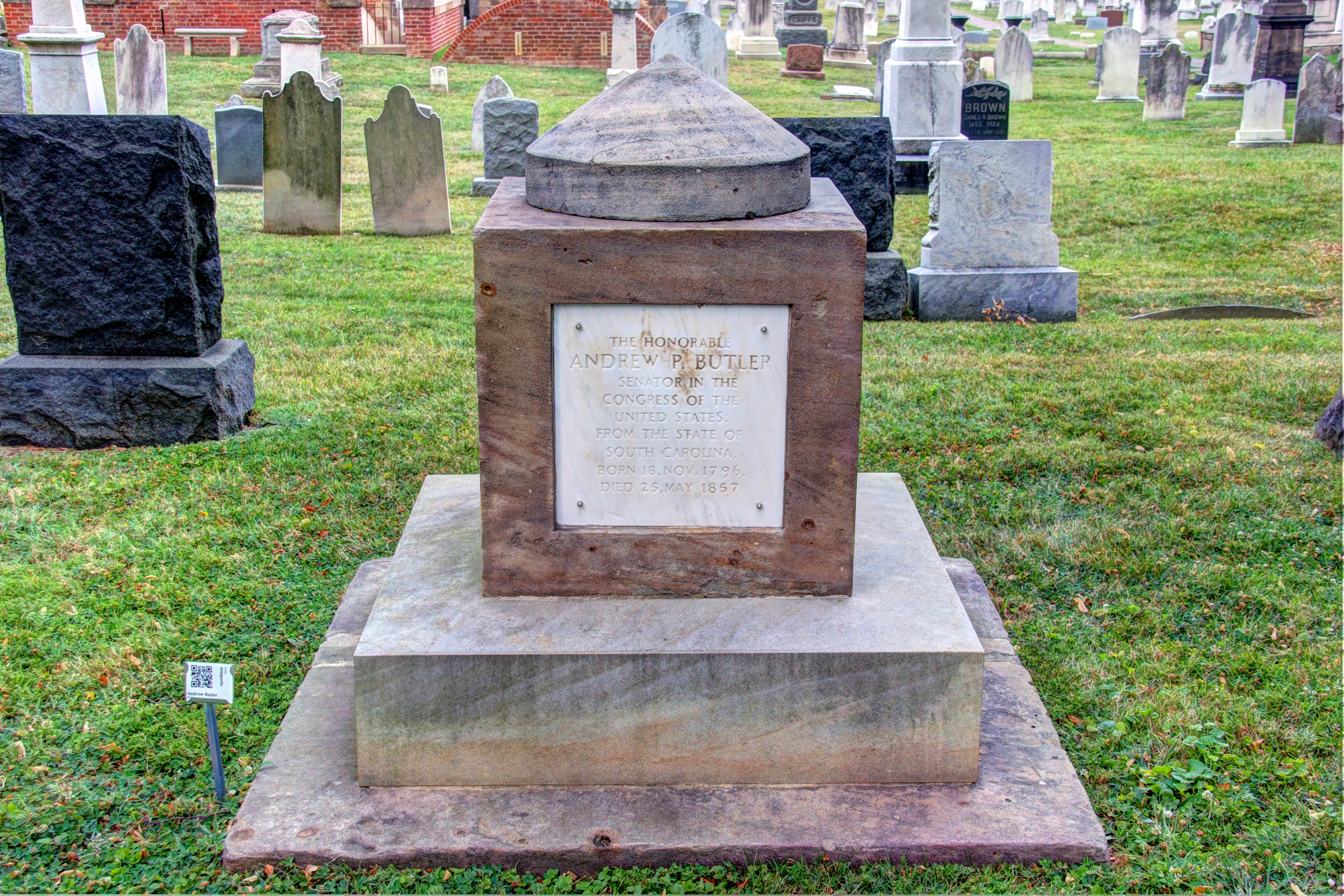
Andrew Butler's cenotaph

- John Quincy Adams (1767–1848), President, Senator, and Representative – Massachusetts, cenotaph only and was interred in the Public Vault in 1848. R54/S101.
- James C. Alvord (1808–1839), Representative – Massachusetts, cenotaph only. R57/S141.
- Simeon H. Anderson (1802–1840), Representative – Kentucky, cenotaph only. R57/S135
- Charles Andrews (1814–1852), Representative – Maine, cenotaph only. R54/S161.
- Chester Ashley (1791–1848), Senator – Arkansas, cenotaph only. R60/S144.
- Nick Begich (1932–1972), Representative Alaska, shares cenotaph with Hale Boggs. They were both lost in a plane crash. R53/S123.
- James Bell (1804–1857), Senator – New Hampshire, cenotaph only. R60/S101
- Thaddeus Betts (1789–1840), Senator – Connecticut, cenotaph only. Name spelled Thaddel S Betts on cenotaph. R57/S114.
- George M. Bibb (1776–1859), Senator – Kentucky, cenotaph only. R 57/ S 143.
- Henry Black (1783–1841), Representative – Pennsylvania, cenotaph only. R56/S126.
- James A. Black (1793–1848), Representative South Carolina, cenotaph only. R55/S104.
- Hale Boggs (1914–1972), Representative Louisiana, shares cenotaph with Nick Begich. They were both lost in a plane crash. R53/S123.
- Thomas Bouldin (1781–1834), Representative Virginia, cenotaph only. Only congressman to die while addressing Congress. R29/S72.
- Edward Bradley (1808–1847), Representative – Michigan, cenotaph only. R55/S107.
- Samuel Brenton (1810–1847), Representative Indiana, cenotaph only. R60/S104.
- Preston Brooks (1819–1857), Representative South Carolina; beat Senator Sumner with a cane, cenotaph only. R60/S116
- Anson Brown (1800–1840), Representative New York, cenotaph only. R57/S138.
- Nathan Bryan (1748–1798), Representative North Carolina, cenotaph, burial site unknown. R57/S117
- Alexander H. Buell (1801–1853), Representative New York, cenotaph only. R54/S157
- Barker Burnell (1798–1844), Representative Massachusetts, cenotaph only. R60/S104.
- Andrew Pickens Butler (1796–1857), Representative – South Carolina, cenotaph only. R60/S84
- Chester Pierce Butler (1798–1850), Representative Pennsylvania, cenotaph only. R57/S163.

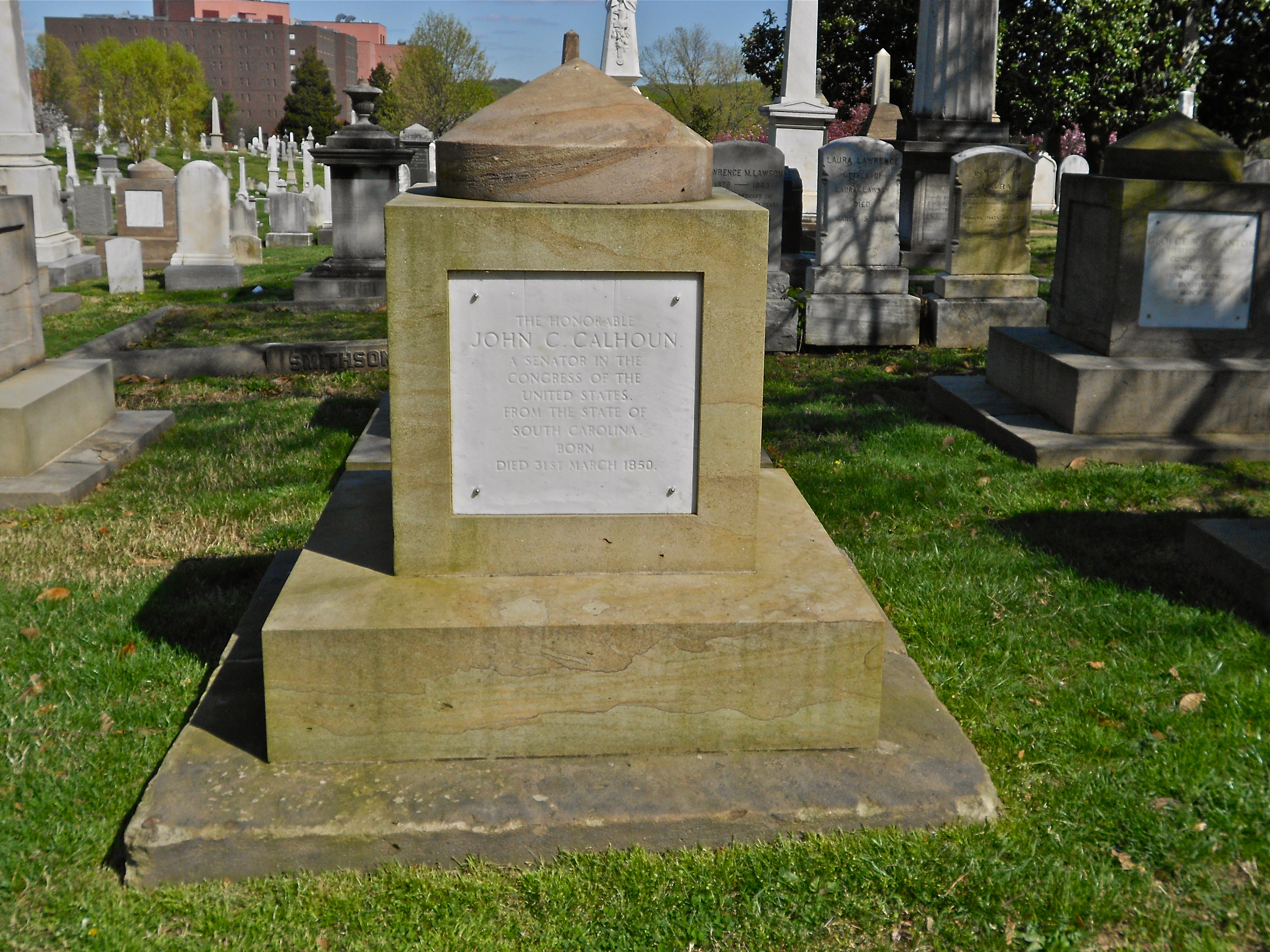
John C. Calhoun

- John C. Calhoun (1782–1850), Vice President, Senator, Representative South Carolina, cenotaph only. R60/S146
- Brookins Campbell (1808–1853), Representative Tennessee, centotaph only. R60/S137.
- Jonathan Cilley (1802–1838), Representative Maine, killed in a duel by Rep. William J. Graves, cenotaph only. R30/S60.
- Henry Clay (1777–1852), Senator, Representative Kentucky, "the Great Compromiser," cenotaph only. R60/S149.
- John E. Coffee (1782–1836), Representative Georgia, reelected posthumously, cenotaph only. R56/S122.
- Thomas Buchecker Cooper (1823–1862), Representative Pennsylvania, cenotaph only. R59/S146.
- Jacob Crowninshield (1770–1806), Representative Massachusetts, cenotaph only. R57/S108
- Ezra Darby (1768–1808), Representative from New Jersey. R24/S4.
- Benjamin Franklin Deming (1790–1834), Representative Vermont, cenotaph only. R56/S120.
- Charles Denison (1818–1867), Representative Pennsylvania, cenotaph only. R59/S119.
- Rodolphus Dickinson (1797–1849), Representative Ohio, cenotaph only. R57/S157.
- David Dickson (1794–1836), Representative Mississippi, cenotaph only. R57/S120.
- Davis Dimock, Jr. (1801–1842), Representative Pennsylvania, cenotaph only. R55/S135.
- Nathan Fellows Dixon (1774–1842), Senator Rhode Island, cenotaph only. R55/S138.
- Presley Underwood Ewing (1822–1854), Representative Kentucky, cenotaph only. R60/S128.
- John Fairfield (1797–1847), Representative, Senator, Governor Maine, cenotaph only. R54/S116.
- Darwin Abel Finney (1814–1863), Representative Pennsylvania, cenotaph only. R59/S116.
- Orin Fowler (1791–1852), Representative Massachusetts, cenotaph only. R54/S160.
- William Osborne Goode (1797–1859), Representative Virginia, cenotaph only. R60/S69.
- Peterson Goodwyn (1745–1818), Representative Virginia, cenotaph only. R57/S111.
- Henry Grider (1796–1866), Representative Kentucky, cenotaph only. R59/S125.
- Richard W. Habersham (1786–1842), Representative Georgia, cenotaph only. R54/S137.
- Thomas Lyon Hamer (1800–1846), Representative Ohio, cenotaph only. R56/S156.
- Cornelius S. Hamilton (1821–1867), Representative Ohio, cenotaph only. R59/S97.
- Luther Hanchett (1825–1862), Representative Wisconsin, cenotaph only. R59/S140.
- John H. Harmanson (1803–1850), Representative Louisiana, cenotaph only. R55/S157.
- Sampson Willis Harris (1809–1857), Representative Alabama, cenotaph only. R60/S119.
- Thomas L. Harris (1816–1858), Representative Illinois, cenotaph only. R60/S78.
- Thomas Hartley (1748–1800), Representative Pennsylvania, cenotaph only. R56/S107.
- William Soden Hastings (1798–1842), Representative Massachusetts, cenotaph only. R57/S132.
- David Heaton (1823–1870), Representative North Carolina, cenotaph only. R59/S101.

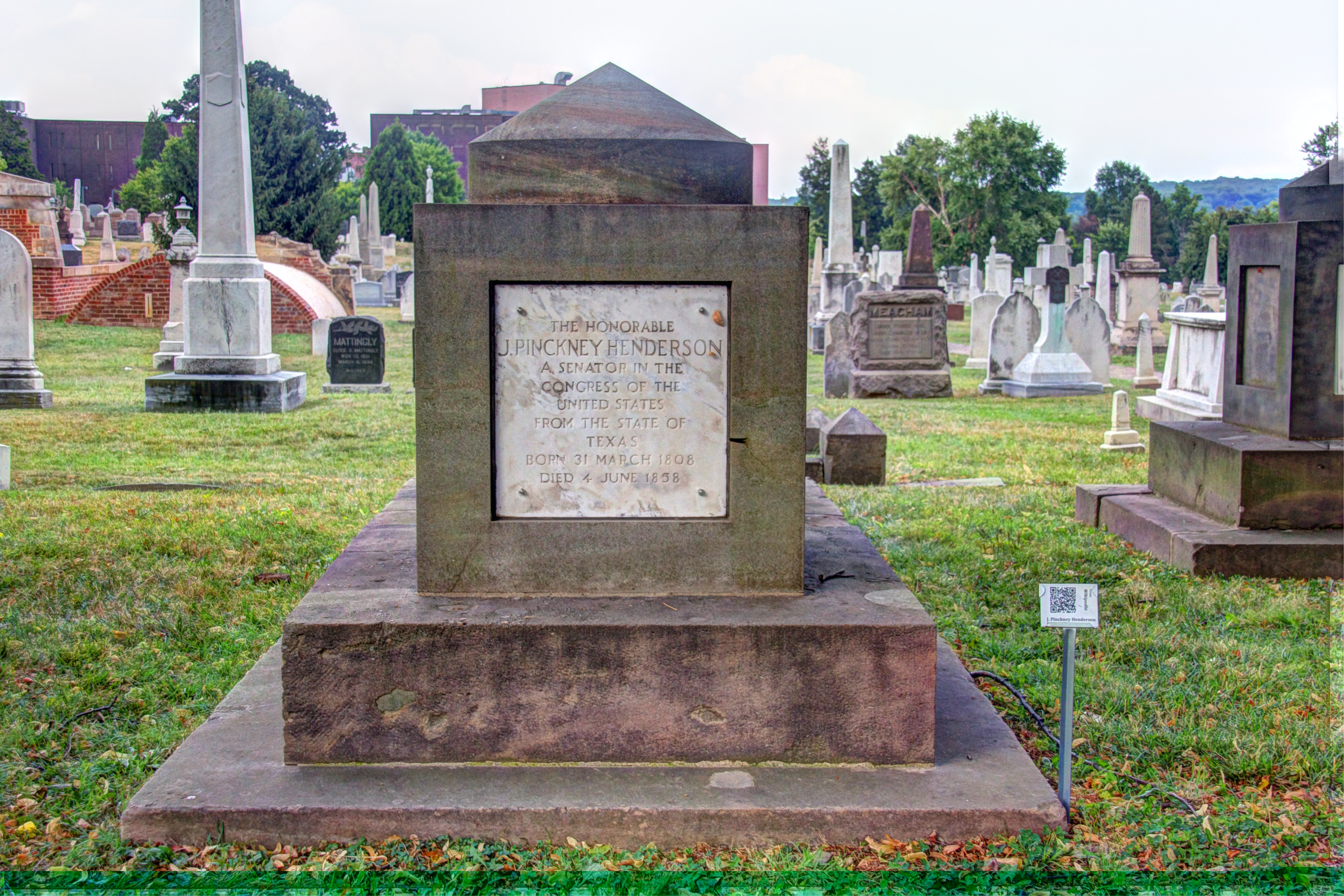
J. Pinckney Henderson

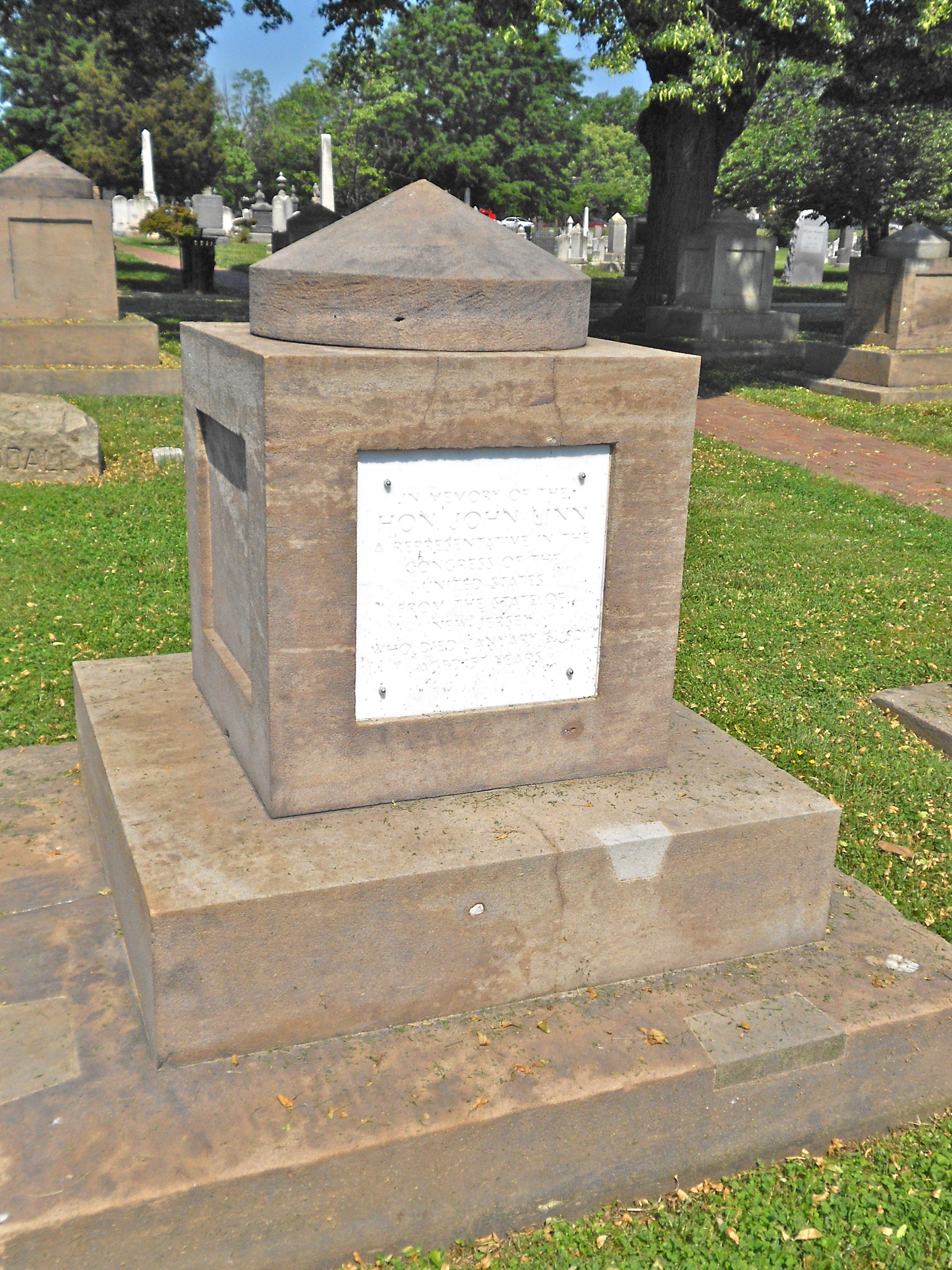
John Linn

- J. Pinckney Henderson (1799–1858), Senator Texas, cenotaph only. R60/S91.
- Robert Pryor Henry (1788–1826), Representative Kentucky, cenotaph only. R57/S123.
- Richard P. Herrick (1791–1846), Representative New York, cenotaph only. R54/S114.
- Daniel Hiester (1747–1804), Representative Pennsylvania and Maryland, cenotaph only. R56/S104.
- James M. Hinds (1833–1868), Representative Arkansas, cenotaph only. R59/S107.
- Elijah Hise (1802–1867), Representative Kentucky, cenotaph only. R59/S113.
- Truman H. Hoag (1816–1870), Representative Ohio, cenotaph only. R59/S91.
- John M. Holley (1802–1848), Representative New York, cenotaph only. R57/S154.
- Gabriel Holmes (1764–1829), Representative Governor North Carolina, cenotaph only. R56/S111.
- Benjamin F. Hopkins (1820–1870), Representative Wisconsin, cenotaph only. R59/S128.
- John Westbrook Hornbeck (1804–1848), Representative Pennsylvania, cenotaph only. R54/S105.
- James Humphrey (1811–1866), Representative New York, cenotaph only. R59/S128.
- Jonathan Hunt (1787–1832), Representative Vermont, cenotaph only. R29/S52.
- James Johnson (1774–1826), Representative Kentucky, cenotaph only. R57/S128.
- Philip Johnson (1818–1867), Representative Pennsylvania, cenotaph only. R59/S123.
- Josiah S. Johnston (1784–1833), Representative Louisiana, cenotaph only. R57/S160.
- Elias Kane (1794–1835), Senator Illinois, cenotaph only. R31/S72.
- Orlando Kellogg (1809–1865), Representative New York, cenotaph only. R59/S131.
- Daniel P. King (1801–1850), Representative Massachusetts, cenotaph only. R55/S160.
- George L. Kinnard (1803–1836), Representative Indiana, cenotaph only. R57/S126.
- James Lockhart, Representative Indiana, cenotaph only. R60/S108.
- Owen Lovejoy (1811–1864), Representative Illinois, cenotaph only. R59/S134.
- William Lowndes (1782–1822), Representative South Carolina, cenotaph only. R55/S129.
- Isaac McKim (1775–1838), Representative Maryland, cenotaph only. R30/S58.
- James Meacham (1810–1856), Representative Vermont, cenotaph only. R60/S125.
- John Millen (1804–1843), Representative Georgia, cenotaph only. R54/S129.
- John Gaines Miller (1812–1856), Representative Missouri, cenotaph only. R60/S113.
- Richard Irvine Manning I (1789–1836), Representative, Governor South Carolina, cenotaph only. R31/S65.
- John Gallagher Montgomery (1805–1857), Representative Pennsylvania, cenotaph only. R60/S110.
- Heman A. Moore (1809–1844), Representative Ohio, cenotaph only. R55/S123.
- Henry Augustus Muhlenberg (1823–1854), Representative Pennsylvania, cenotaph only. R60/S134.
- Henry Nes (1799–1850), Representative Pennsylvania, cenotaph only. R55/S154.
- John William Noell (1816–1863), Representative Missouri, cenotaph only. R59/S137.
- Thomas E. Noell (1839–1867), Representative Missouri, cenotaph only. R59/S94.
- Moses Norris, Jr. (1799–1853), Representative, Senator New Hampshire, cenotaph only. R60/S87.
- Tip O'Neil (1912–1994), Representative Massachusetts. Burial in Massachusetts with cenotaph and additional marker at Congressional Cemetery. R52/S123.
- Charles Ogle (1798–1841) Representative Pennsylvania, cenotaph only. R56/S128.
- Isaac S. Pennybacker (1805–1847), Representative, Senator Virginia, cenotaph only. R54/S111.
- Joseph Hopkins Peyton (1808–1845), Representative Tennessee, cenotaph only. R55/S120.
- William Wilson Potter (1793–1839), Representative Pennsylvania, cenotaph only. R55/S132.
- John A. Quitman (1799–1858), Representative, Governor Mississippi, cenotaph only. R60/S81.
- William Sterrett Ramsey (1810–1840), Representative Pennsylvania, cenotaph only. R56/S135.
- Christopher Rankin (1788–1826), Representative Mississippi. R29/S42.
- Robert Rantoul, Jr. (1805–1852), Representative, Senator Massachusetts, cenotaph only. R60/S140.
- Thomas Jefferson Rusk (1803–1857), Senator Texas, cenotaph only. R60/S93.
- Lemuel Sawyer (1777–1852), Representative North Carolina, cenotaph only. R30/S26.
- John Schwartz (1793–1860), Representative Pennsylvania, cenotaph only. R60/S72.
- George W. Scranton (1811–1861), Representative Pennsylvania, cenotaph only. R59/S149.
- Alexander D. Sims (1803–1848), Representative South Carolina, cenotaph only. R56/S155.
- Charles Slade (d. 1834), Representative Illinois, cenotaph only. R56/S114.
- Nathan Smith (1770–1835), Senator Connecticut, cenotaph only. R30/S63.
- John F. Snodgrass (1802–1854), Representative Virginia, cenotaph only. R60/S131.
- Cyrus Spink (1793–1859), Representative Ohio, cenotaph only. R60/S75.

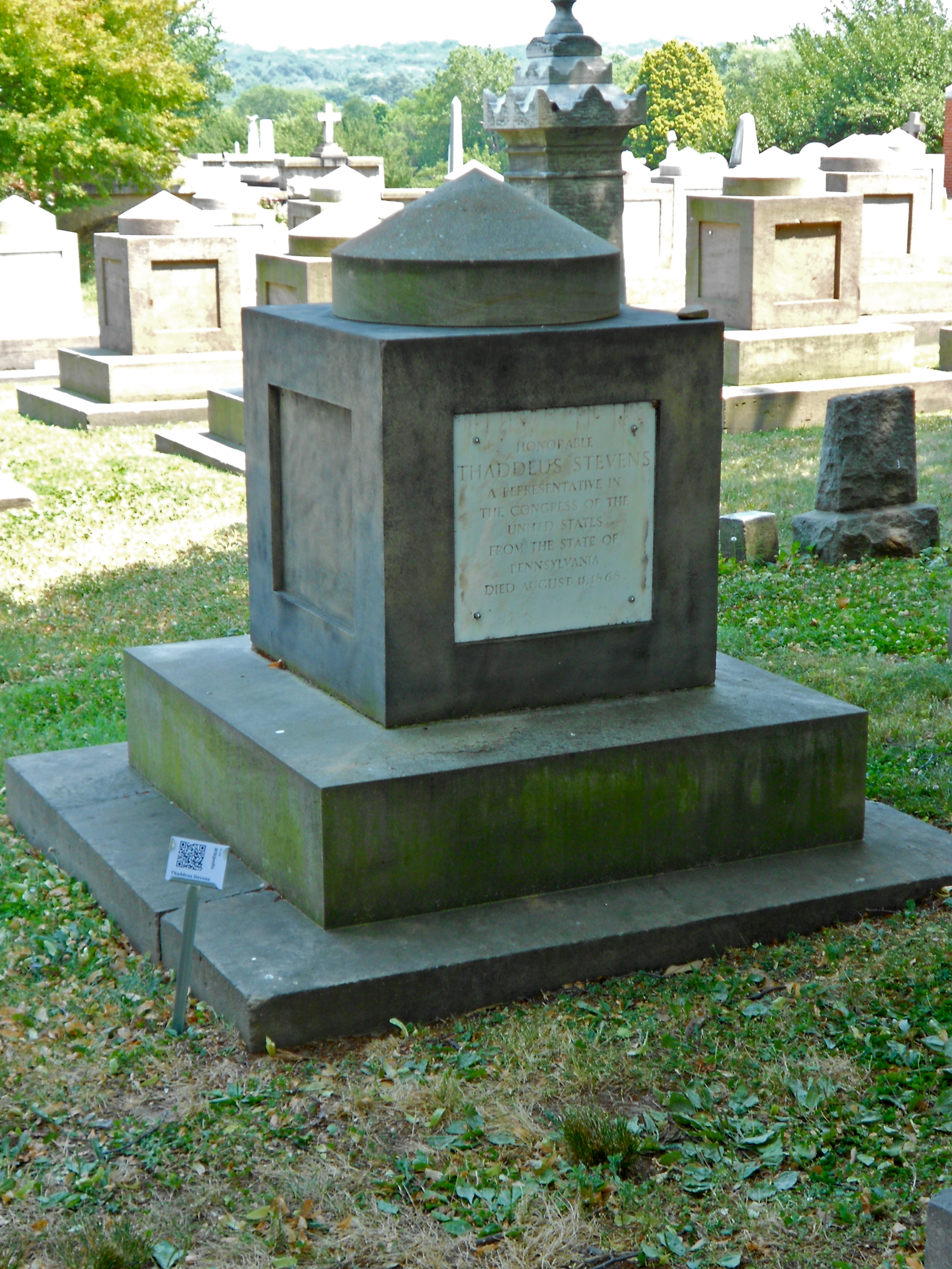
Thaddeus Stevens

- Thaddeus Stevens (1792–1868), Representative Pennsylvania, cenotaph only. R59/S110.
- Hedge Thompson (1780–1823), Representative New Jersey, cenotaph only. R30/S49.
- Zalmon Wildman (1775–1835), Representative Connecticut, cenotaph only. R31/S69.
- James Wray Williams (1792–1842), Representative Maryland, cenotaph only. R54/S134.
- Lewis Williams (1882–1842), Representative North Carolina, cenotaph only. R56/S132.
- Henry Wilson (1778–1826), Representative Pennsylvania, cenotaph only. R56/S117.
- Amos E. Wood (1810–1840), Representative Ohio, cenotaph only. R56/S163.
- Samuel Gardiner Wright (1781–1845), Representative New Jersey, cenotaph only. R54/S126.

== See also ==
- List of public art in Washington, D.C., Ward 6
