= William Arden =

William Arden may refer to:

- William Arden, pen name of American author Michael Collins
- William Arden, 2nd Baron Alvanley (1789–1849), British Army officer, peer and socialite

== See also ==
- William Arden Maury (1832–1918), American lawyer and politician
