= Walter Lenox =

American politician (1817–1874)

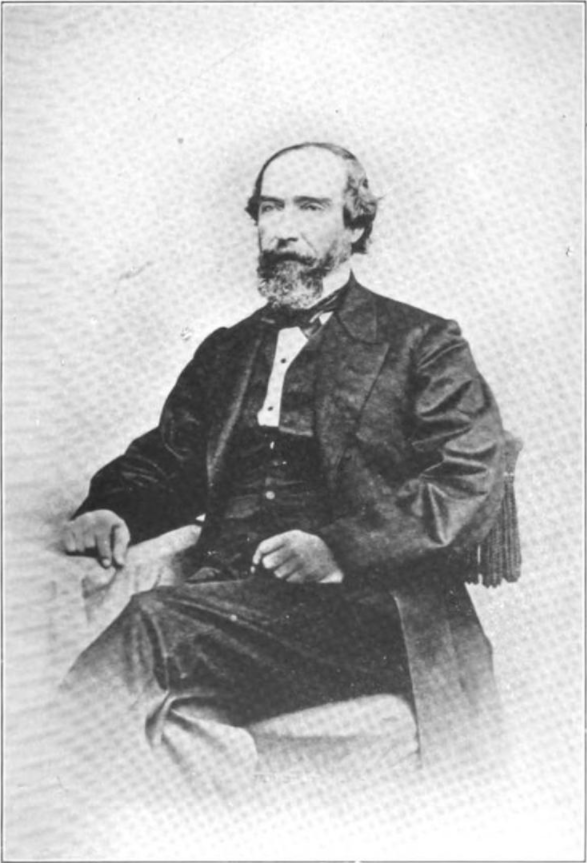

14th Mayor of the City of Washington, D.C.
- In office June 10, 1850 – June 14, 1852
- Preceded by: William Winston Seaton
- Succeeded by: John Walker Maury

Personal details
- Born: August 17, 1817 Washington City, U.S.
- Died: July 16, 1874 (aged 56) Washington City, U.S.
- Resting place: Rock Creek Cemetery; Washington, D.C., U.S.
- Party: Whig
- Spouse: Rachel Ludlow (m. 1855)
- Children: 1
- Education: Yale University

Walter Lenox (August 17, 1817 – July 16, 1874) was mayor of Washington, D.C., from 1850 to 1852. He was the only mayor of Washington City born within the city and one of just two born in the District of Columbia.

== Early life ==
Lenox was born in the City of Washington on August 17, 1817, the son of Captain Peter Lenox and Margaret Wilkerson Lenox. He was the first mayor to be born in the city of Washington. He was attended the Chase Academy of Salmon P. Chase. He graduated from Yale University in 1837. He studied law under Richard S. Coxe and was admitted to the bar on March 18, 1840. He returned to Washington to practice law in the early 1840s. During the last part of that period, he lived with future Washington mayor Richard Wallach.

== Political career ==
Lenox served on the Washington city council (the lower of its two legislative chambers) from 1842 to 1843, then as an Alderman from 1843 to 1849, serving his last term as President of the Board of Aldermen. Thus when mayor William Winston Seaton declined to run for a sixth term in 1850, Lenox was the heir apparent — although because of his young age (only 33), he was dismissed by many residents of the city, particularly when the popular former mayor Roger C. Weightman announced his intention to seek the office again. Ultimately, Lenox won the election by 32 votes.

Lenox's term as mayor was of little note; his most prominent accomplishments were his presiding at the laying of the cornerstone of the extension to the U.S. Capitol, service on the Washington Monument Association, and proclamation of an official day of mourning for the deceased President Zachary Taylor. The records of the Columbia Historical Society also note that he was "deeply concerned with the education of the youth. He gave greater attention to the public school question than any other."

Lenox was a Whig, which became a liability in the mayoral election of 1852 (the year in which the Whig Party collapsed). His Democratic opponent, John Walker Maury, defeated Lenox by almost 900 votes. He later aligned with the Democratic party against the Know Nothings.

== Later life ==
After his mayoralty, Lenox married but became a widower after only eighteen months. In January 1855, he married Rachel Ludlow (the sister of William H. Ludlow, Speaker of the New York Legislative Assembly). She and their first-born child died in July 1856.

Lenox, who as mayor in 1851 had opposed the creation of the Normal School for Colored Girls, the first normal school in the city, wrote to a local paper in 1859 to oppose the school's move to a larger facility. Of African Americans in D.C., he wrote: "Their number, originally too large in proportion to our white population, is increasing rapidly both by their natural increase and from immigration. Justice to ourselves and kindness to them require that we should prohibit immigration and encourage their removal from our limits. Now, it is plainly manifest that the success of this school enterprise must largely increase our negro population by the inducements it offers. The schools will be increased with the demand. It will bring not only scholars to remnain temporarily, but entire families, until our District is inundated with them".

Lenox sympathized with and supported the Confederacy. In June 1861, after the occupation of Alexandria by Union forces during the Civil War, he moved to Richmond where he organized other "refugees" from DC, Maryland and Delaware. Upon returning to Washington in October 1863 to settle the estate of a deceased relative, he spoke openly in contempt of the Union and was arrested and imprisoned by his old friend, General Winfield Scott. He spent the next 20 months in the prison at Fort McHenry and was released in October 1865, half a year after the war ended. Lenox's health suffered after prison. He died on July 16, 1874, at the age of 57, at his sister's home in Washington, D.C. He was interred at Rock Creek Cemetery in Washington.

== Legacy ==
In 1887, the Walter Lenox School at 5th and G SE opened and was named in his honor. It closed in 1931 and the building served various non-profit organizations until the late 1990s when it was sold for development. In 2006 it opened as condominiums.

Political offices
Preceded by William Winston Seaton	Mayor of Washington, D.C. 1850–1852	Succeeded by John Walker Maury
