= Benjamin Orr (disambiguation) =

Benjamin Orr (1947–2000) was an American musician.

Benjamin Orr may also refer to:

- Benjamin Orr (Massachusetts politician) (1772–1828), member of the U.S. House of Representatives
- Benjamin G. Orr (1762–1822), mayor of Washington, D.C.
