= William Maury =

William Maury may refer to:

- William Lewis Maury, American explorer and naval officer
- William Arden Maury, American lawyer and politician
