= John Maury =

John Maury may refer to:

- John Walker Maury, mayor of the City of Washington
- John Minor Maury, lieutenant in the United States Navy

== See also ==
- Maury John, American college basketball coach
