= Thomas Carbery =

American politician (1791–1863)

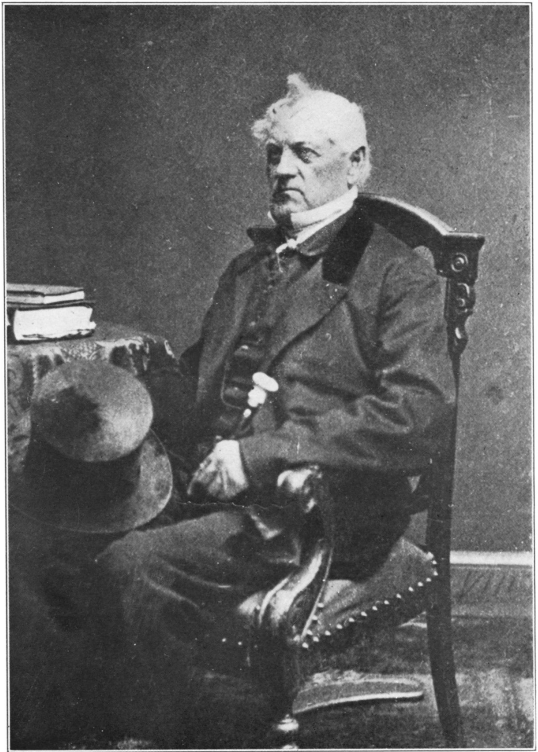

6th Mayor of the City of Washington, D.C.
- In office June 14, 1822 – June 14, 1824
- Preceded by: Samuel N. Smallwood
- Succeeded by: Samuel N. Smallwood

Personal details
- Born: June 26, 1791 St. Mary's County, Maryland, U.S.
- Died: May 23, 1863 (aged 71)
- Resting place: Mount Olivet Cemetery; Washington, D.C., U.S.
- Spouse: Mary H. Manning (m. 1826; died 1834)
- Children: 4
- Military career
- Allegiance: United States
- Branch: United States Army
- Service years: 1813–1815
- Rank: Captain
- Unit: 36th Infantry
- Conflicts: War of 1812

Thomas Carbery (or Carberry) (June 26, 1791 – May 23, 1863) was the sixth mayor of the City of Washington (now Washington, D.C.), serving from 1822 to 1824. He ran again for mayor in 1824 and 1826 but was not re-elected.

== Early life ==
Thomas Carbery was born and raised in St. Mary's County, Maryland, one of at least eleven known children of Thomas Carbery Sr. and Mary Asonath Simmons. His Carbery forebears were of Irish extraction. Thomas' family relocated to the District of Columbia, near Georgetown, around 1805. The future mayor of Washington, D.C. was the nephew of Colonel Henry Carbery, a Revolutionary War officer and the first Adjutant General of Maryland. Another close relative, his aunt Eleanor Sewall née Carbery, was the wife of the prominent Georgetown City Tavern proprietor, Clement Sewall, another Revolutionary War officer and childhood friend of Colonel Henry Carbery.

== Mayor of Washington, D.C. ==
When the beloved (and first popularly elected) mayor of Washington, Samuel N. Smallwood, announced that he would not run for a second elected term as mayor, Carbery sought the office. In 1822 he defeated Roger C. Weightman in a race so close that Weightman sued him; the lawsuit was tied up in court for the entire two years of Carbery's term.

In 1824, Smallwood again sought the office of mayor, defeating the incumbent Carbery's bid for re-election. Carbery ran again in 1826, re-matched with Weightman, and lost.

== Career ==
He was president of the National Metropolitan Bank, one of the largest financial institutions in Washington (it underwrote the payroll of the entire U.S. Army during the War of 1812. Carbery himself was a captain in the U.S. Army's 36th Infantry. He enlisted on April 30, 1813 and was honorably discharged on June 15, 1815.

Carbery was a charter member and officer of the Washington National Monument Society, the group that ultimately financed the construction of the Washington Monument, in the 1830s. He ultimately became chairman of the monument's building committee when construction began in 1848.

During the 1820s, Carbery was a member of the prestigious Columbian Institute for the Promotion of Arts and Sciences, who counted among their members former presidents Andrew Jackson and John Quincy Adams and many prominent men of the day, including well-known representatives of the military, government service, medical and other professions.

In 1844, Carbery was appointed by President John Tyler as Justice of the Peace for Washington County. He would be re-nominated by every succeeding president until his death.

== Personal life ==
Carbery married Mary H. Manning of Loudoun County, Virginia on November 2, 1826, but she died young in 1834. All four of their children also died young, none reaching the age of ten.

Carbery lived in a large house on 17th Street NW, adjacent to The Ellipse, known as Carbery House. The house, built in 1818, survived 85 years before being demolished in 1903. (Carbery also maintained an estate off Seventh Street Road (now known as Georgia Avenue NW) in the northernmost section of the District of Columbia that is now the Takoma neighborhood.)

Carbery's sister, Ann Mattingly, who lived with him in her widowhood, became extremely ill in 1817 with what doctors diagnosed as an internal cancer. The family, devout Roman Catholics, summoned Father Anthony Kohlmann, a French Jesuit priest, who referred the matter to a priest in Germany who was famous for miraculous cures. In March 1824, Kohlman held a novena with the family, then, at a time coordinated with the German, said a Mass in her home while the German did the same from Hamburg. She soon sat up in bed, the affliction apparently gone. Many Catholics considered this much-publicized incident to be one of the first miracles documented in the United States, though the hierarchy of the Catholic Church never endorsed this view.

== Later life ==
Captain Carbery died at his home in 1863. He was interred in Mount Olivet Cemetery in Washington.

Thomas H. Carbury Elementary School on 5th Street NE between D and E in Washington, D.C. was named in his honor. It has since been closed.

Political offices
| Preceded by Samuel N. Smallwood | Mayor of Washington, D.C. 1822–1824 | Succeeded by Samuel N. Smallwood |
