= Owen Thomas Edgar =

American soldier (1831–1929)

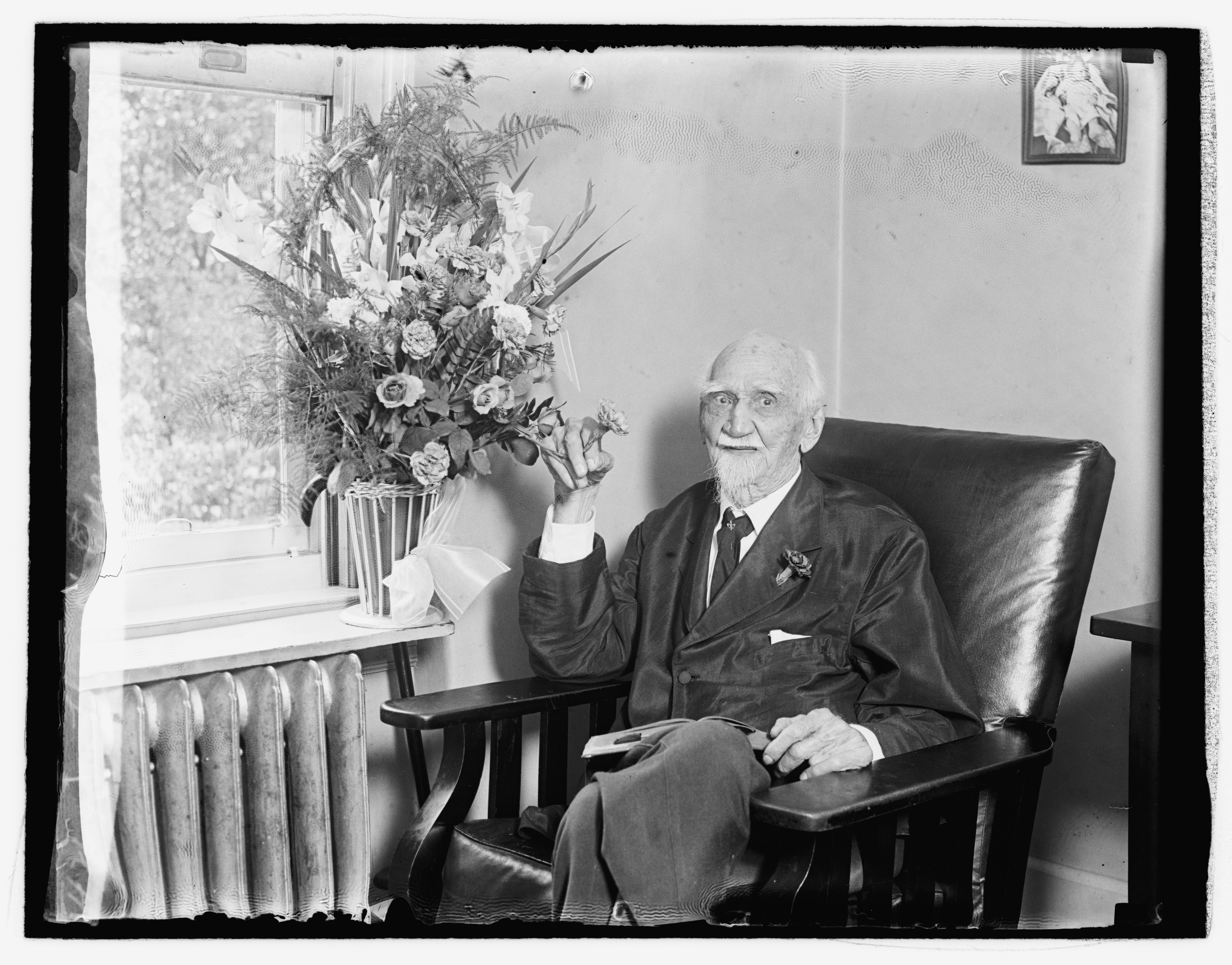
- Edgar in 1929
- Born: June 17, 1831; Philadelphia, Pennsylvania, US
- Died: September 3, 1929 (aged 98); Washington, D.C., US
- Burial place: Congressional Cemetery
- Military career
- Allegiance: United States of America
- Branch: United States Navy
- Service years: 1846–1849
- Rank: Apprentice First Class
- Units: USS Potomac; USS Allegheny; USS Pennsylvania; USS Experience
- Conflicts: Mexican–American War; Siege of Veracruz; Battle for Mexico City

Owen Thomas Edgar (June 17, 1831 – September 3, 1929) was an American soldier who was the last surviving American veteran of the Mexican–American War.

== Biography ==
Edgar was born on June 17, 1831, in Philadelphia. Prior to the Mexican–American War, he worked as a printer. He enlisted in the United States Navy as a second-class apprentice on February 10, 1846, and was discharged on August 8, 1849, as a first-class apprentice. He saw service on the frigates Potomac, Allegheny, Pennsylvania and Experience, and fought in the Siege of Veracruz and the Battle for Mexico City.

In 1861, Edgar moved to Washington, D.C.. He worked at the Bureau of Engraving and Printing for twenty-one years, then worked at the Columbia National Bank for another thirty-one years. He retired in 1919. He was married to Fances Ann Edgar. Religiously, he was a member of the Methodist Episcopal Church.

According to data from the United States Department of the Navy and the United States Department of Veterans Affairs, Edgar was the longest surviving American veteran of the war. He became the last surviving American veteran of the Mexican-American War on June 17, 1929, when fellow war veteran William Fitzhugh Thornton Buckner died at age 101, in Paris, Missouri. On his 98th birthday, he received a letter from Charles Francis Adams III, congraduating him for the accomplishment. He refused to speak on the specifics of his military service to reporters.

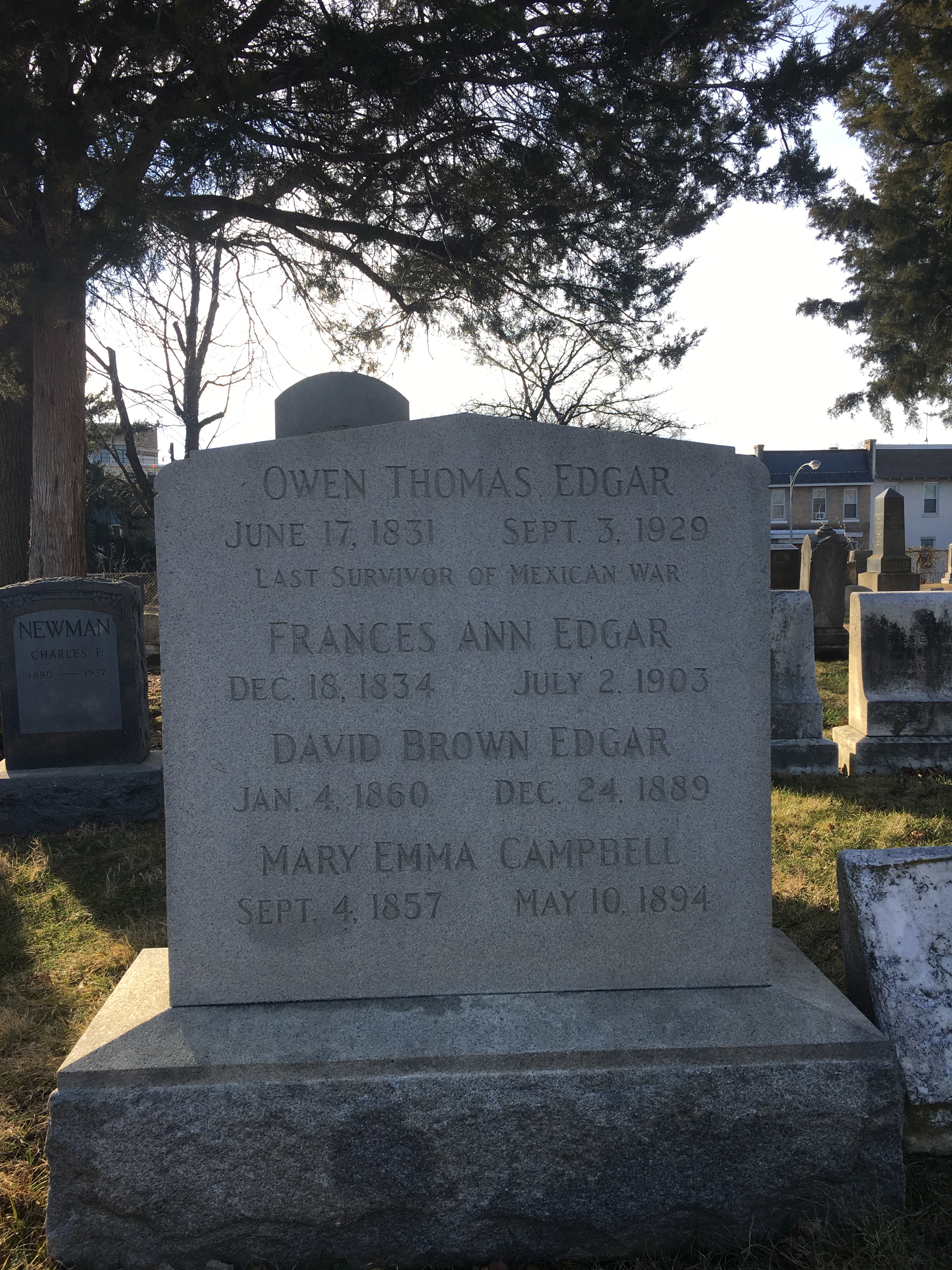
Edgar's headstone

In the final eight years of his life, Edgar lived at the John Dickson Home. Around 1928, he significantly lost grip strength, with his eyesight also deteriorating with age. To read, he required glasses and a magnifying glass. Despite his age, he was relatively active. He died on September 3, 1929, aged 98, in Washington, after falling from a chair and sustaining a broken leg. He was buried on September 5, at Congressional Cemetery, in Washington.

== See also ==
- List of burials at the Congressional Cemetery
- List of last surviving veterans of military insurgencies and wars
- List of last surviving veterans of military operations
