= William B. Magruder =

American physician (1810–1869)

William Beans Magruder
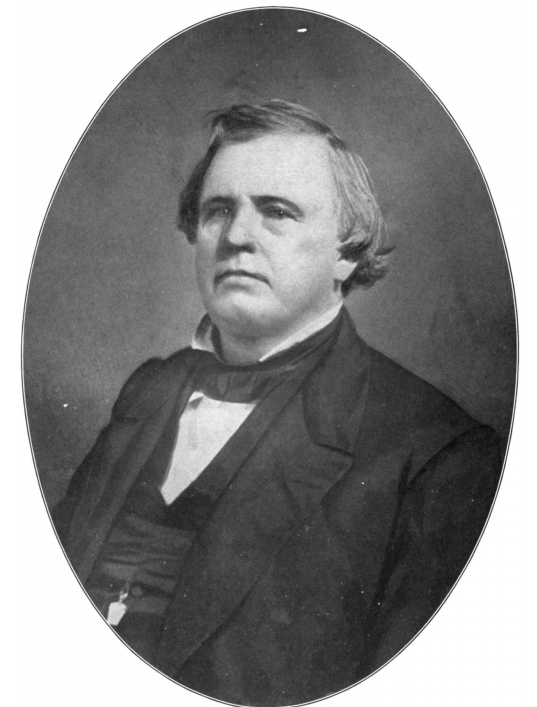

17th Mayor of the City of Washington, D.C.
- In office June 9, 1856 – June 14, 1858
- Preceded by: John T. Towers
- Succeeded by: James G. Berret

Personal details
- Born: February 11, 1810 Upper Marlboro, Maryland, U.S.
- Died: May 30, 1869 (aged 59) Washington, D.C., U.S.
- Resting place: Oak Hill Cemetery; Washington, D.C., U.S.
- Party: Anti-Know-Nothing Party
- Spouse(s): Elizabeth Hutchinson, Sarah Van Wyck
- Children: Milicent Magruder
- Education: University of Maryland Medical School at Baltimore
- Occupation: Physician

William Beans Magruder (1810–1869) was a medical doctor and the seventeenth Mayor of Washington City, District of Columbia, from 1856 to 1858.

Magruder was born in Montgomery County, Maryland in 1810. Shortly after his birth, the family moved to Georgetown, D.C., where Magruder was raised and educated. He studied medicine and pharmacy in Washington, and then at the University of Maryland Medical School at Baltimore, graduating in 1831 and setting up practice in Washington. A year later, a disastrous epidemic of cholera broke out in Washington, and the citizens petitioned for Magruder to be placed in charge of the Western Hospital. His heroic conduct during the epidemic made his reputation as an important physician in the city. He shortly afterward traveled to Cincinnati to assist that city with its own cholera epidemic.

Magruder was the subject of a famous anecdote that wound its way into Harper's magazine. He was attempting to talk a small boy into taking a dose of castor oil, promising him that the medicine was very sweet, when the boy replied, "Well, then, if it's so good, why don't you take some yourself?"

Magruder entered public office in 1835, when he became a member of the Washington Board of Health. Two years later he was elected to the city's Common Council, then to the Board of Aldermen in 1843, where he served until 1856.

In 1856, incumbent mayor John T. Towers — a member of the controversial "Know-Nothing" American Party — declined to seek re-election. The Know-Nothings nominated one Silas H. Hill to succeed him as mayor; the city's Democrats, Republicans, and remaining Whigs banded together as the "Anti-Know-Nothing Party" and nominated Magruder. After one of the fiercest campaigns in the history of Washington, Magruder won the mayoral election by a mere 13 votes.

Magruder's term as mayor was mostly marked by improvements to the city's infrastructure, in particular building an archway over a stream that then ran near L Street and frequently overflowed, damaging the city streets. He did, however, deal with the crisis of the June 1857 Election Riots, in which the Know-Nothings recruited a street gang from Baltimore, the Plug-Uglies, to come to Washington on its local Election Day and intimidate the voters at the polls; the Plug-Uglies turned away anti-Know-Nothing voters with rocks, guns, and knives, until some citizens brought weapons of their own and the violence grew into mob rule. When the rioters reached levels of over 1,000, Magruder closed the polls and requested military aid from President James Buchanan. Before soldiers arrived, the rioters had stolen a Federal cannon and Magruder pleaded with the mob to abandon it and surrender until Navy Marines arrived and dispersed the rioters.

Magruder did not receive the Anti-Know-Nothing nomination for mayor in the 1858 election, and the coalition's new candidate, James G. Berret, acceded to the office. Magruder ran again as an independent candidate in 1860 but lost to Berret. After leaving office, Magruder continued to practice medicine until dying from a stomach infection in May, 1869. He was buried at Oak Hill Cemetery in Washington, D.C.

In 1887, the William Beans Magruder School was opened on the 1700 block of M Street NW. It was closed after the 1979–1980 school year, rehabilitated and reopened as the Magruder building, part of the Seward Square office complex.

Political offices
Preceded by John T. Towers	Mayor of Washington, D.C. 1856–1858	Succeeded by James G. Berret
