= Samuel Nicholas Smallwood =

American politician

5th Mayor of the City of Washington, D.C.
- In office June 14, 1819 – June 14, 1822
- Preceded by: Benjamin G. Orr
- Succeeded by: Thomas Carbery

7th Mayor of the City of Washington, D.C.
- In office June 14, 1824 – September 30, 1824
- Preceded by: Thomas Carbery
- Succeeded by: Roger C. Weightman

Personal details
- Born: September 5, 1772 Charles County, MD
- Died: September 30, 1824 (aged 52) Washington, DC
- Resting place: Congressional Cemetery
- Spouse: Ruth Beall
- Parent: Samuel Smallwood (father)
- Relatives: William Smallwood
- Occupation: merchant

Samuel Nicholas Smallwood (5 September 1772 – September 30, 1824) was the fifth and seventh mayor of Washington, D.C., and was the first popularly elected mayor of the city. Appointed to a one-year term in 1819, Smallwood was elected the following year to a two-year term, which he served from 1820–1822. He then was re-elected in 1824 but served only three months of his second term before dying at the age of 52.

== Biography ==
Smallwood was born in Charles County, Maryland, in 1772. He was the son of Samuel Smallwood, from a prominent family that included members of the Maryland Assembly and Revolutionary War hero General William Smallwood. In 1794, Smallwood moved to the section of Prince George's County that would eventually become southeast Washington. He worked on both of the most important and prestigious construction projects in the new capital: he quarried rock for the foundation of the White House and was overseer of the slaves who built the U.S. Capitol in 1795. In 1801, he married Ruth Beall. By 1804 he was one of the leading merchants of lumber and building supplies in the city. He also owned one of the major wharves in the city, Smallwood's Wharf, on the Anacostia River (then known as the "Eastern Branch") in southeast Washington, D.C. He was also a bank director and an incorporator for the Washington Canal that was built in 1815.

In 1807, Smallwood was one of eight wealthy city residents (along with George Blagden, Commodore Thomas Tingey and Henry Ingle) who attenuated a large lot in Washington for use as a public burial ground. He signed the article incorporating what would become Congressional Cemetery on April 4, 1807.

Serving as an Alderman beginning in 1804, Smallwood became mayor of Washington in 1819. In 1820, the United States Congress amended the city charter to allow the Mayor to be popularly elected to a two-year term, and Smallwood was popularly elected in 1820. In 1821, Mayor Smallwood and the Board of Aldermen imposed new, more onerous restrictions on free black people in order to limit their movement and to dissuade free blacks from settling in Washington. One of the new requirements was a surety bond, which William Costin challenged, with only partial success, in court. Smallwood also worked on legislation to establish the District's prison and Asylum, to keep the river navigable, to mandate that chimney's be swept regularly to avoid fires and to prevent the abuse of horses.

During his mayoral term, he was responsible for the construction of what is now the 11th Street Bridge across the Anacostia River, connecting the city to the village of Uniontown (now Anacostia). He also adopted plans for the construction of a City Hall designed by original U.S. Capitol architect George Hadfield. (Hadfield's City Hall is now the courthouse for the Supreme Court of the District of Columbia.)

Smallwood chose not to run for mayor in 1822 because of health and business concerns. However, in 1823, he served on a city committee to finance and erect a brick wall around the Congressional Cemetery. The wall was erected in 1824. That year, Smallwood ran for mayor again and was reelected. His final act, signed August 24, 1824, established a committee to arrange the reception of General Lafayette. After an illness of a few weeks, he died on September 30, 1824, having served just over three months of his second term as mayor. He is interred in a family plot in Congressional Cemetery.

In 1889, a Washington, DC schoolhouse on I Street SW between 3d and 4 1/2 Street was named the Smallwood School in his honor. The building was razed in the 1960s as part of the redevelopment of SW.

Smallwood's house, at 324 Virginia Avenue SE, became, in the second decade of the 20th century, the location of the Friendship House Association, a settlement house. It was razed to build I-695.

His widow died in 1836. They had four children.

Political offices
Preceded by Benjamin G. Orr	Mayor of Washington, D.C. 1819–1822	Succeeded by Thomas Carbery
Preceded by Thomas Carbery	Mayor of Washington, D.C. 1824	Succeeded by Roger C. Weightman
