= John Walker Maury =

American politician (1809–1855)

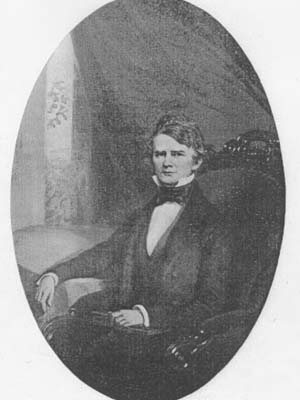

15th Mayor of the City of Washington, D.C.
- In office June 14, 1852 – June 12, 1854
- Preceded by: Walter Lenox
- Succeeded by: John T. Towers

Personal details
- Born: May 15, 1809 Caroline County, Virginia
- Died: February 2, 1855 (aged 45) Washington, D.C.
- Resting place: Congressional Cemetery; Washington, D.C.
- Party: Democratic Party
- Relatives: James Maury; James Maury (consul); Matthew Fontaine Maury

John Walker Maury (May 15, 1809 – February 2, 1855) was an American municipal politician from the Democratic Party. He served as the fifteenth mayor of the City of Washington for a single two-year term, from 1852 to 1854.

== Early life ==
John Walker Maury was born in Caroline County, Virginia in 1809 to a prominent Virginia family. His great-grandfather, Reverend James Maury, had founded the Maury Classical School for Boys, at which Thomas Jefferson was his student for two years. His grandfather, Walker Maury, was headmaster of a school in Williamsburg; his great-uncle, "Consul" James Maury, was the United States' first consul to Liverpool, England, appointed by George Washington; and his second cousin, Matthew Fontaine Maury, was a famous and accomplished oceanographer.

He moved at 17 to the City of Washington (as Washington, D.C. was then called), where he established a law practice. He married five years later, in 1831, to Isabel Foyles, eventually producing 15 children.

== Political career ==
At the age of 26, John Walker Maury was elected to the Common Council of Washington City, serving for five years until declining to run again in 1840. However, one year afterward, he was elected to the Board of Aldermen. After eleven years as an alderman, Maury was elected as Mayor in 1852.

Sixty years after his father's death, William Arden Maury eulogized Maury by associating him with three main efforts. First, he claims that Maury and the philanthropist William Wilson Corcoran convinced Congress to appropriate funds for the Government Hospital for the Insane, now known as St. Elizabeths Hospital. Second, he notes that Maury was mayor when Congress funded a study under the supervision of Montgomery C. Meigs to improve the public water supply by means of the Washington Aqueduct. Third, he recounts that Maury provided payments to sculptor Clark Mills to complete the statue of Andrew Jackson on horseback that stands in Lafayette Square, across the street from the White House. Mills later repaid Maury from a commission for an equestrian statue of George Washington.

Despite these contributions, Maury merits only a passing and dismissive mention in Constance McLaughlin Green's Pulitzer Prize-winning work, Washington, Village and Capital, 1800-1878, in which she writes that "the gentle John Maury was beloved as a man but was a singularly inept politician". In 1854, at the peak of the Know-Nothing movement in American politics, Maury was unseated by Know-Nothing candidate John T. Towers. Maury died one year later, shortly before his 46th birthday.

Like several early leaders of Washington City, including mayors such as Robert Brent and Benjamin G. Orr, Maury participated in and benefited from the system of slavery. The 1840 United States census recorded that Maury was enslaving five people, among them a boy and a girl younger than ten. A decade later, in the 1850 United States census, Maury reported holding a 23-year-old woman in bondage. In 1862, Maury's widow, Isabel, petitioned the federal government for payment under the District of Columbia Compensated Emancipation Act, which reimbursed enslavers after emancipation in the capital. Her claim sought compensation for six people whom the law had freed: Eliza Dyson and her five children, then between the ages of four and fifteen. According to the petition, Maury had willed the family to his wife, treating them as inheritable property.

At the time of his death in 1855, Maury was president of the National Bank of the Metropolis, a position he had assumed after the death of John P. Van Ness in 1846. Maury was interred at Congressional Cemetery. His son William Arden Maury would recall that "There was, perhaps, never a greater outpouring of the people from President Pierce and the venerable Senator Benton down to the humblest citizen than was seen at his funeral."

Maury Elementary, one of the District of Columbia Public Schools, was named in honor of John Walker Maury upon its construction in 1886.

Political offices
| Preceded by Walter Lenox | Mayor of Washington, D.C. 1852–1854 | Succeeded by John T. Towers |
