= John T. Towers =

American politician (1811–1857)

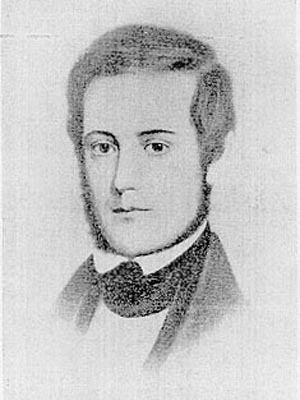

16th Mayor of the City of Washington, D.C.
- In office June 12, 1854 – June 12, 1856
- Preceded by: John Walker Maury
- Succeeded by: William B. Magruder

Personal details
- Born: John Thomas Towers; 1811 Alexandria, Virginia
- Died: August 12, 1857 (aged 45–46)
- Resting place: Congressional Cemetery
- Party: Whig _{(until 1852)}, Know Nothing _{(as of 1852)}
- Occupation: Printer

John Thomas Towers (1811–1857) was Superintendent of Printing at the U.S. Capitol and the sixteenth Mayor of Washington City, District of Columbia, from 1854 to 1856.

Towers was born in Alexandria, D.C., in 1811 to parents who had recently arrived from Bingham, England. He was trained as a printer, joined the Columbia Typographical Society in 1834, and maintained several book and printing shops in Washington until 1852 when President Millard Fillmore appointed him superintendent of printing at the U.S. Capitol. (The position was the forerunner of the modern Government Printing Office.)

Towers became involved in politics in the 1830s, publishing a journal called the Whig Standard. He was subsequently elected to the Common Council in 1842, where he served for four years until election to the Board of Aldermen in 1846. In 1849, President Zachary Taylor appointed Towers to be one of the three Inspectors of the Penitentiary of the District of Columbia.

With the collapse of the Whig Party in 1852, Towers joined the Know-Nothing movement, the political party defined by its opposition to rights for immigrants and Roman Catholics. Banking on his strength as a member of city government and his reputation as a printer, the Know-Nothings put Towers up for mayor against incumbent Democrat John Walker Maury in 1854. The Know Nothings peaked all across America that year, electing mayors in most of its most important cities. Towers was no exception, winning the election with 3,000 votes compared to Maury's 2,594 votes. He was inaugurated on June 12, 1854.

Towers' accomplishment was largely limited to developing plans for an infirmary and workhouse on the Marine reservation in Southeast Washington. At the time, the city was steadily growing from a small rural village to a busy metropolis, but Towers and his fellow government officials were unused to the changes and were not sure how to govern the changing city. He continually, but without success, petitioned Congress to fund and provide for the nation's capital.

Towers did not seek reelection in 1856. He died on August 12, 1857, one year after his mayoral term ended. He was interred in Congressional Cemetery.

In 1887, an unnamed school building on the corner of 8th and C Streets SE in Washington DC was renamed the Towers school in his honor. In 1929 it was merged with the Wallach School and Eastern High School to create the Lemon G. Hine School. The building itself was torn down between 1949 and 1966 for a new Hine School building.

Political offices
Preceded by John Walker Maury	Mayor of Washington, D.C. June 12, 1854–June 12, 1856	Succeeded by William B. Magruder
