= James G. Berret =

American politician

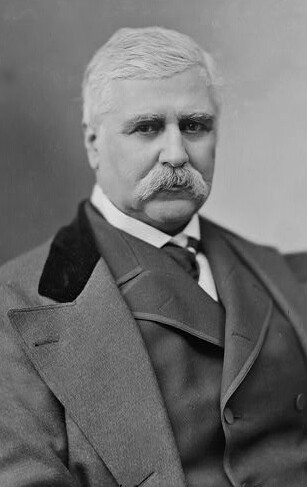

18th Mayor of the City of Washington, D.C.
- In office June 14, 1858 – August 26, 1861
- Preceded by: William B. Magruder
- Succeeded by: Richard Wallach

Delegate of the Maryland House of Delegates
- In office 1835–1837

Delegate of the Maryland House of Delegates
- In office 1891–1892

Personal details
- Born: James Gabriel Berret; February 1, 1815; Carroll County, Maryland, U.S.
- Died: April 14, 1901 (aged 86); Washington, DC
- Resting place: Congressional Cemetery
- Political party: Anti-Know-Nothing-Party, Democratic

James Gabriel Berret (February 12, 1815 – April 14, 1901) was an American politician who served as a Maryland state legislator from 1837 to 1839 and again in 1891 and as the eighteenth Mayor of Washington, District of Columbia, from 1858 to 1861, when he was forced to resign from office after being jailed by the Lincoln administration for sedition. He was also President of the Electoral College in 1888.

== Early life ==
Berret was born in what was then Baltimore County, Maryland on February 12, 1815. He was of French heritage and his father had been brought to America after his parents and most of his family had been killed during the Haitian Revolution. The nurse who helped him and his sister escape was able to bring the family jewels which were sold to pay for his education. His mother, maiden name O'Connell, was from Baltimore. James Berret had only two years of formal education before his father pulled him out to help on the farm, which they inherited from James' mother's family. When his father died in 1831, Berret took over the farm full-time. In 1836, at the age of 21, he was elected to the Maryland state legislature to represent the newly formed Carroll County. He served two one-year terms from 1837 to 1839.

== Career ==
Upon leaving the legislature he was appointed to an office in the U.S. Treasury by President Martin Van Buren and moved to Washington, DC. He served in the Treasury until 1850, at which time he started his own business prosecuting claims before the US government. That work continued until 1853 when President Franklin Pierce appointed him Postmaster of the District of Columbia. He served on the inaugural committee for Presidents James Buchanan and Abraham Lincoln. In the late 1840s, he was appointed by Governor Philip Francis Thomas of Maryland on his staff as Colonel. In the 1880's he was promoted to quartermaster general with the rank of brigadier general by Governor Robert Milligan McLane.

In 1858, Berret was nominated as the mayoral candidate for the Anti-Know-Nothing Party, a coalition of political parties that formed in 1854 as an opposition to the Know-Nothings' electoral successes in the city. He was a staunch believer in the rights of naturalized citizens to vote. However, by 1858, the Know-Nothings were a spent force, and the U.S. political landscape was such that the Republicans, who had once been a part of the Anti-Know-Nothing coalition, now stood independently from it as an opposition to President Buchanan and the Supreme Court's decision in Dred Scott v. Sandford. Thus Berret was pitted against Richard Wallach, the U.S. Marshal for the District; both men were of equal popularity, means, and political reputation, but on election day Berret won by 680 votes in an election that was marked by rioting, requiring the Marines to deploy, and the deaths of four citizens.

The election sparked a fierce rivalry between Wallach and Berret, enough so that when Berret defeated Wallach again in the 1860 contest by only 24 votes, Wallach published editorials in every Washington newspaper charging Berret with massive fraud in both elections.

With the outbreak of the Civil War in 1861, the Republicans in the U.S. Congress pushed through legislation that required all public officers in Union territory to take oaths of allegiance to the United States. When Berret refused, insisting that his oath as mayor of the nation's capital should suffice, Secretary of State William H. Seward had him arrested, jailed in the Old Capitol Prison, then sent to Fort Lafayette, New York. Three weeks later, when no evidence of collaboration with the enemy surfaced, Seward had Berret released and returned to Washington—on the condition that he immediately resign as mayor. Berret telegraphed his resignation to the Washington City Council, who had already elected Wallach to replace him.

Berret eventually became friends with Lincoln and the President nominated him to be a commissioner of the emancipation of slaves in the District of Columbia, but the Senate refused to confirm his nomination. He had more success when Ulysses S. Grant nominated him to the board of police commissioners in 1872, where he served until 1877. He was one of the most vocal opponents of the change of government in the District that occurred in 1871 and even led a lawsuit to stop it.

He moved back to Maryland and was an Elector for Maryland in 1888, and as such was named President of the Electoral College that year. He was returned to the Maryland legislature representing Carroll County in 1891, serving on the Ways and Means committee. He later served on the inaugural committee for President Grover Cleveland and as the first Vice-President of the Washington Monument Society. Berret died April 14, 1901, from the flu and was buried in Congressional Cemetery in Washington, DC. His wife, Julia Wright, preceded him in death by 3 years. His last residence in Washington was at 1535 I Street N.W.

The Berret School in Washington, DC was named in his honor. It was closed in the 1950s, but the building was eventually converted to condos in 2000 and it is now called the Berret School Lofts.

Political offices
Preceded by William B. Magruder	Mayor of Washington, D.C. 1858–1861	Succeeded by Richard Wallach
