= William Arden Maury =

American lawyer and politician

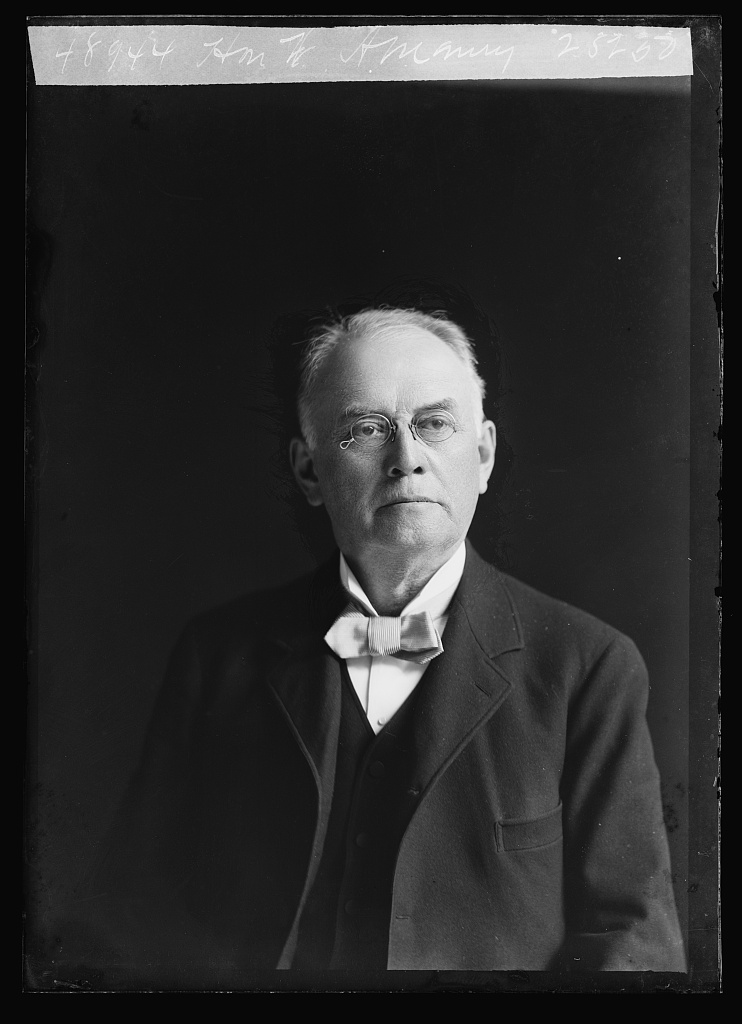
William Arden Maury.

William Arden Maury (July 29, 1832 – June 16, 1918) was an American lawyer and politician. He served as United States Assistant Attorney General from 1889 to 1893. He was a distant relative to Matthew Fontaine Maury and married his eldest daughter. Note too that they both worked in "Washington City" as it was then called.

Born Washington, D.C., to John Walker Maury and Isabel Foyles, he attended Harvard Law School.
