= Benjamin G. Orr =

American politician

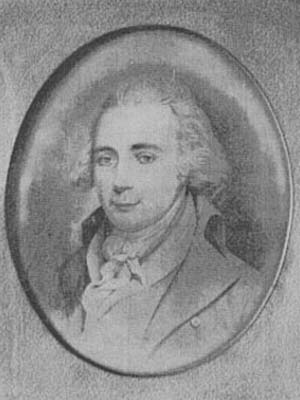

4th Mayor of the City of Washington, D.C.
- In office June 9,1817 – June 14,1819
- Preceded by: James H. Blake
- Succeeded by: Samuel Nicholas Smallwood

Personal details
- Born: Benjamin Grayson Orr; 1762 Virginia
- Died: 1822 (aged 59–60)

Benjamin Grayson Orr (1762–1822) was the fourth mayor of Washington, D.C., elected by the council of aldermen in 1817 and serving for two years. He was often called Colonel Orr, but it is unclear how he obtained that title.

Orr was probably born in Virginia. He was married to Elizabeth Flood, also of Virginia, and had lived for some time in Kentucky where in 1797 he was involved in a quarrel that led to a challenge to a dual that he did not accept. In 1800, he was living in Philadelphia. He moved into the city by 1801 and took up residence in one of the "Six Buildings" on Pennsylvania Avenue. By 1802 he had become a grocer in Georgetown – which in the early 19th century was a separate town from Washington. He was elected an Alderman in 1812, but resigned one year later and became a supplier to U.S. Army brigades in Ohio and Michigan.

As mayor, Orr procured public improvements such as grading of the streets and established Washington's first volunteer fire companies, appropriating $1,000 for the purchase of four fire bells and procured apparatus for the companies. He also authorized a lottery to raise funds to build a penitentiary and city hall.

He died in 1822 and was buried in Congressional Cemetery in an unmarked grave.

Benjamin Orr Elementary School in Southeast Washington, D.C., which opened in 1902 as an all-white school but in the 2016–17 school year was "97 percent black, 2 percent Hispanic and zero percent white," was named for him until 2018 when the predominantly black student body at Orr Elementary discovered the school was named for a slave owner and decided to rename the school for Lawrence E. Boone, the school's African-American principal from 1973 to 1996. The vote of the D.C. Council to change the name was unanimous.

Orr leased a slave for $250 to James Madison, Secretary of State of the United States at the time, according to the National Historical Publications and Records Commission. He also advertised two slaves for sale in 1802.

Political offices
Preceded by James H. Blake	Mayor of Washington, D.C. 1817–1819	Succeeded by Samuel N. Smallwood
