= Our Lady of Africa =

Our Lady of Africa may refer to:

- Our Lady of Africa, a Catholic devotion to the Blessed Virgin Mary
- Notre-Dame d'Afrique, a Catholic basilica in Algeria
- Notre Dame D'Afrique, Bangui, a Catholic church in the Central African Republic
- Shrine of Our Lady of Africa, a Catholic shrine in the Spanish exclave of Ceuta in North Africa

== See also ==
- Our Mother of Africa Chapel, Washington, D.C.
- Titles of Mary
