= Jean-Eugène =

Jean-Eugène is a given name. Notable people with the given name include:

- Jean-Eugène Buland (1852-1926), French painter
- Jean-Eugène Dezeimeris (1799-1852), French librarian
- Jean-Eugène Fromageau (1822-1897), French architect
- Jean Eugène Robert-Houdin (1805-1871), French magician
