= Our Lady =

Our Lady often refers to:

- Mary, mother of Jesus
- Veneration of Mary in the Catholic Church

Our Lady may also refer to:

== Titles of Mary ==
A number of specific Marian Apparitions, icons, titles, or Marian shrines such as:

See also the Category:Titles of Mary, mother of Jesus

=== Ancient and medieval titles ===
- Our Lady of Guadalupe, Extremadura, a Marian shrine in the medieval kingdom of Castile
- Our Lady of Ljeviš, a 12th-century Serbian Orthodox Church cathedral in the town of Prizren, Kosovo
- Our Lady of Mount Carmel, who appeared to St. Simon Stock in 1251
- Our Lady of Nazaré, a Marian icon sculpted in wood, by St. Joseph according to the legend of Nazaré
- Our Lady of Peñafrancia, a wooden statue of the Blessed Virgin Mary venerated in Naga City, Bicol, Philippines
- Our Lady of Perpetual Help, associated with a celebrated Byzantine icon of the same name dating from the 15th century
- Our Lady of Trsat, a 13th-century apparition of Croat woodcutters near Trsat Castle, Rijeka, Croatia
- Our Lady of Walsingham, an 11th-century apparition to a Saxon noblewoman in Norfolk.
- Our Lady of Westminster, a 15th-century alabaster madonna venerated in Westminster Cathedral, London
- Our Lady With The Poovan Bananas, a 13th-century apparition at Koratty, Kerala, India
- Our Lady, Star of the Sea, a title of the Virgin Mary
- Our Lady of Poland, a title of the Virgin Mary

=== Modern titles ===
- Our Lady of the Abandoned Parish Church (Marikina), a Roman Catholic church in Marikina, Philippines
- Our Lady of Akita, an apparition in Yuzawadai, Akita Prefecture, Japan in 1973–1979.
- Our Lady of Aparecida, the patroness saint of Brazil, represented by a statue of the Virgin Mary located in the Basilica of Aparecida in Aparecida, São Paulo
- Our Lady of Arabia, the patroness of the Arabian peninsula
- Our Lady of Fatima, a title given to the Virgin Mary by Catholics and others who believe that she appeared to three shepherd children at Fátima, Portugal, in 1917
- Our Lady of Ferguson, a 21st-century title and icon inspired by the Shooting of Michael Brown in 2014
- Our Lady of the Good Event, a late-16th- to early-17th-century apparition in Quito, Ecuador
- Our Lady of Good Voyage, a devotion that originated in Portugal and Spain
- Our Lady of Guadalupe, a Roman Catholic icon and Mexico's most popular religious image
- Our Lady of the Hens, the finding of a Marian icon and subsequent apparitions in Pagani, Campania
- Our Lady of Knock, a Marian apparition in Knock-Aghamore, Ireland, in 1879
- Our Lady of La Salette, a Marian apparition that appeared in 1846 to two shepherd children in La Salette
- Our Lady of Lebanon, a Marian shrine and a pilgrimage site in Harissa, Lebanon
- Our Lady of Lourdes, a Marian apparition first seen in Lourdes, France, in 1858
- Our Lady of Međugorje, a Marian apparition that appeared to Croat children in Međugorje, Herzegovina, in 1980
- Our Lady of Palmar, a Marian apparition in El Palmar de Troya, Spain in the 1970s; rejected by the Catholic Church.
- Our Lady of Providence, a title of Mary that originated with the Barnabites in 1664
- Our Lady of Sinj (Gospa Sinjska), the patroness saint of Sinj, Croatia
- Our Lady of Šiluva, an icon of the Virgin Mary in Siluva, Lithuania
- Our Lady of Vaillankanni, a title based on based on apparitions in the 16th–17th centuries in Velankanni, Tamil Nadu, India
- Our Lady of Palestine, a Catholic monastery in central Israel
- Our Lady of Charity, a Marian title and the Patroness of Cuba
- Our Lady of the Rosary, a title of the Virgin Mary
- Our Lady of Miracles, a Marian apparition in 1547 in Alcamo, Sicily
- Our Lady of San Juan de los Lagos, a title of the Virgin Mary and a Roman Catholic church in Jalisco, Mexico
- Our Lady of the Thirty-Three, a title of the Virgin Mary as patroness of Uruguay

== Music ==
- "Our Lady", a song by Deep Purple from their 1973 album Who Do We Think We Are
- A recurring theme on different albums by The Legendary Pink Dots (e.g. "Our Lady in Black", "Our Lady in Chambers")

== Schools ==
- Our Lady of Mount Carmel Learning Center, a school in the Philippines
- Our Lady of Lourdes, a school and church in Bethesda, Maryland

== See also ==
- Our Lady of Africa (disambiguation)
- Our Lady of Mercy College (disambiguation)
- Our Lady of the Rosary
- Academy of Our Lady (disambiguation)
- Church of Our Lady (disambiguation)
- Gospa (Our Lady), a 1995 Croatian/English-language film
- Madonna (disambiguation), Italian/Latin (Ma donna) for "Our Lady"
- Notre Dame (disambiguation), French for "Our Lady"
- Lady (disambiguation)
