= Mary, Protector of Faith (Russo) =

Statue by Jon-Joseph Russo

- Artist: Jon-Joseph Russo
- Year: 2000
- Type: Limestone
- Dimensions: 190 cm × 61 cm × 51 cm (75 in × 24 in × 20 in)
- Location: Washington, D.C., United States; 38°56′3.8″N 77°0′5.28″W
- Owner: Basilica of the National Shrine of the Immaculate Conception

Mary, Protector of Faith is a public artwork by American artist Jon-Joseph Russo, located at the Basilica of the National Shrine of the Immaculate Conception in Washington, D.C., United States. Mary, Protector of Faith stands in Mary's Garden at the Basilica.

== Description ==
This limestone sculpture depicts Mother Mary at full-length holding the infant Christ to her chest. She has long hair and wears a robe which covers her full body, except for her face and feet. She looks towards her right as she holds the baby, wrapped in a small blanket, to her chest. She stands on a pedestal located on the stone border of a fountain.

== Artist ==
Jon-Joseph Russo is based out of Washington, D.C. His work focuses on three main areas of work: landscape architecture, sculpture and furniture design. His educational background consists of a Bachelor of Fine Arts in sculpture from Alfred University and a Masters of Landscape Architecture from Cornell University. His work is inspired by the Italian Renaissance movement. In 1992 he relocated to Washington and formed his own Studio Russo. He work is seen in the collections and landscapes of AECOM, Oehme, van Sweden & Associates, and South Korea.

== Information ==
Mary is located in Mary's Garden, a devotional area located on a three-quarter site on the Basilica grounds. According to the National Council of Catholic Women, the garden "honors Mary, a faith-filled woman who ‘pondered things in her heart..We hope that it will inspire all who come here to mirror Mary's life." The garden features a circular fountain with a variety of benches and small prayer niches for pilgrims and visitors to visit. Trees, flowering shrubs, and flowers with white blossoms surround the area to represent Mary's purity.

== Acquisition ==
The sculpture was commissioned after a contest was held for the statue. Funding for the sculpture was provided by the Diocese of Orlando and the National Council of Catholic Women. Mary is dedicated to former director of the National Shrine, Bishop Emeritus of Orlando, Thomas Joseph Grady. The sculpture was dedicated on June 10, 2000 with over 1,000 in attendance.

== See also ==
- List of public art in Washington, D.C.
- Saint Mother Théodore Guérin, another sculpture at the garden.
