= Our Lady of Africa (title) =

Black Catholic Marian devotion

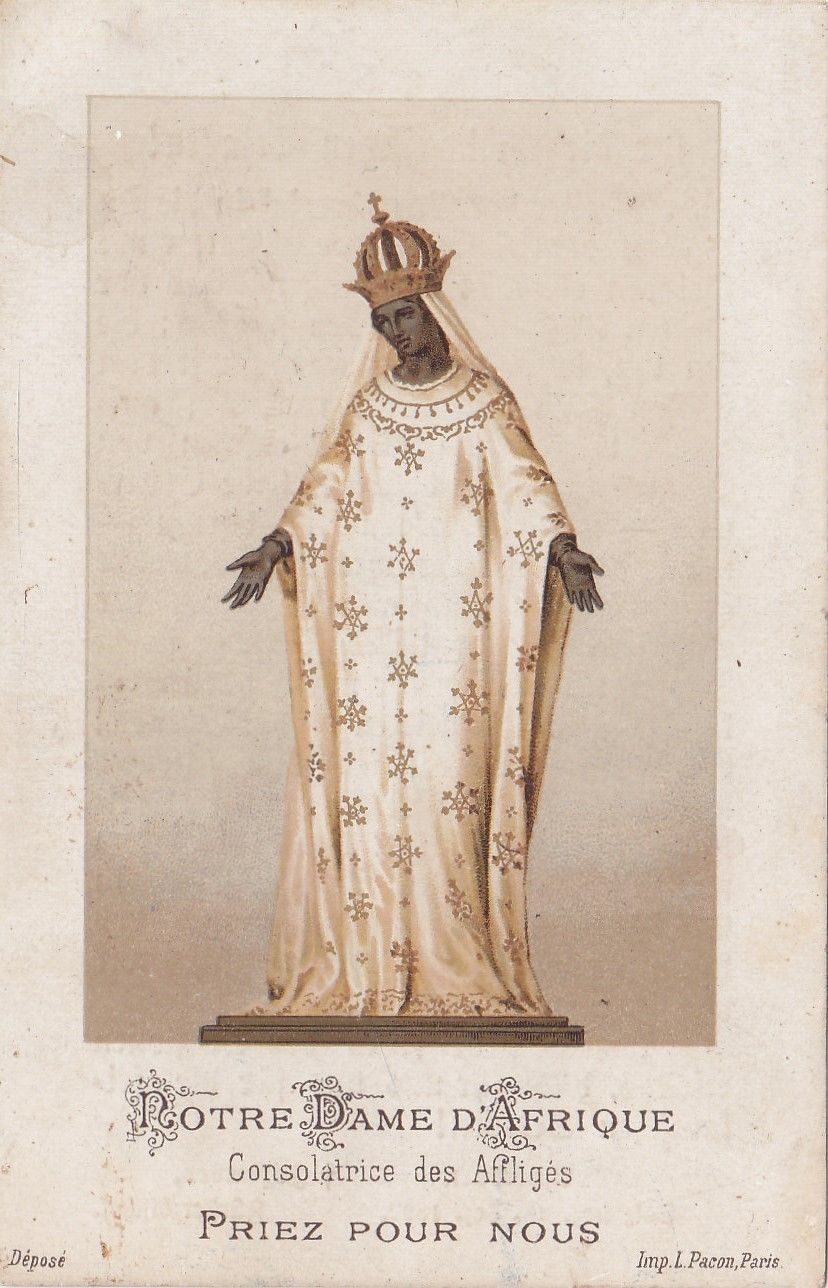
- Vintage holy card of Notre Dame d'Afrique, based on the statue in the basilica of the same name in Algiers, Algeria.
- Venerated in: Catholic Church
- Major shrine: Notre-Dame d'Afrique, Algiers, Algeria, White Fathers, Missionary Sisters of Our Lady of Africa
- Feast: April 30
- Attributes: Blessed Virgin Mary, crowned with arms outstretched
- Patronage: Africa, Algeria, Ceuta

Our Lady of Africa (Spanish: 'Nuestra Señora de África'; French: Notre-Dame D'Afrique; Arabic: السيدة الإفريقية), also known as Our Mother of Africa, is a Catholic title of the Blessed Virgin Mary associated with a statue of her as a Black woman, located in the major shrine of Notre-Dame d'Afrique in Algiers, Algeria. The devotion was spearheaded by Bishop Louis-Antoine-Augustin Pavy of Algiers, who established the basilica under that title in 1856.

The devotion has since gained traction across the African continent, as well as in the African diaspora. Churches under the title have been established around the world, including in the United States.

== History ==
The statue of Our Lady of Africa was originally modeled on a French sculpture entitled Virgo Fidelis ("Faithful Virgin") a copy of an earlier work completed in 1838 by Edmé Bouchardon. The copy was gifted to the Ladies of the Sacred Heart in Paris. A later derivation was ordered by Antoine-Adolphe Dupuch, the first Bishop of Algiers, in 1840, and it continued to pass hands in the next few years until ending up with a group of Trappist monks in Staouéli.

Bishop Louis-Antoine-Augustin Pavy succeeded Dupuch in Algiers in 1846, and later planned to build a church in the city dedicated to the Blessed Virgin. The site he chose had been a place of prayer since 1846, when two women (Anne Cinquin and Agarite Berger) who worked at the local minor seminary had used it to recite the Rosary.

The Ladies of the Sacred Heart in Lyons, his home diocese, proposed that he make use of the Virgo Fidelis that their fellow sisters had possessed. He agreed, adopting the current moniker after consulting with his advisors. It was installed in a small chapel in 1857. The church, Notre-Dame d'Afrique, designed by Jean-Eugène Fromageau, was completed nextdoor by Bishop Charles Lavigerie, M.Afr., Pavy's successor in Algiers. The statue was moved there the same year. A bronze sculpture, it was eventually represented in art as a Madonna with Black skin and African features. As part of the church's development, the French missionaries dedicated the entire African continent to the patronage of Our Lady of Africa.

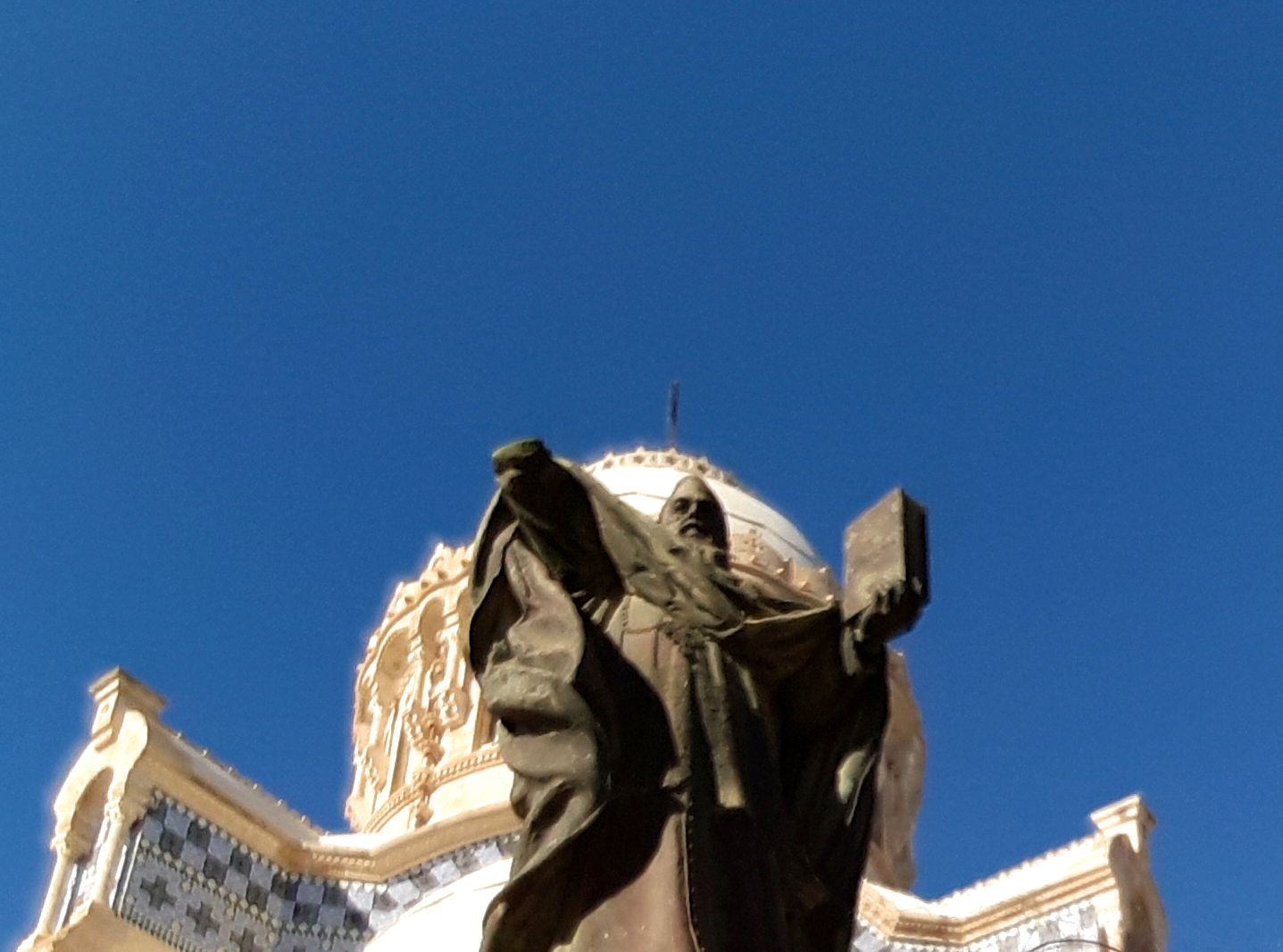
Statue of Cardinal Lavigerie at the Notre Dame d'Afrique (Our Lady of Africa) Basilica in Algiers.

Lavigerie established an order of nuns under the patronage of Our Lady of Africa in 1869, the Missionary Sisters of Our Lady of Africa, closely associated with Lavigerie's own order of priests and brothers, the White Fathers (also known as the Missionaries of Africa). They work among various African peoples providing education and religious instruction. Both congregations were assigned by Lavigerie to assist in operating the new church, which quickly became associated with miraculous healings attributed to the intercession of Our Lady of Africa.

The statue of Our Lady of Africa received a canonical coronation from Pope Pius IX in 1876, in the same ceremony wherein the church was elevated to the status of a minor basilica. A blue gown was added to the statue in 1886.

The archivist of the White Fathers spoke of Our Lady of Africa as such in 1989:

The blessings of Our Lady of Africa also extend, we are sure, to all of Africa and to all those women and men who, while belonging to a multitude of communities, everywhere make up a single large family, fulfilling the function assigned to them and bringing their share to the common task in favor of Africa. (René Xavier Lamey)

The White Fathers have described the devotion in terms of the Virgin Mary's protection of missionaries serving the African continent:

It was therefore necessary that she be given the same maternal task, for the missionaries who were to bring the Good News to Africa, for the Africans and for all the Muslims who already honoured her as Mother of the Prophet. Since she was also offered to us as mother under the name of Our Lady of Africa, may she accompany us Africans, we Missionaries of Africa, in our task of proclaiming the Good News to the African world. May she watch over Africa, may she intercede for all her children throughout the world and especially at this time when every frightened child would do well to seek refuge and security in the arms of his mother. (Fr Patient Bahati, M.Afr.)

A renovation of the basilica in Algiers was completed in 2010, following damage incurred during World War II and the 2003 Boumerdès earthquake. An inscription remains above the statue that reads, in French: “Our Lady of Africa, pray for us and for the Muslims.” The church has served as a site of prayer for both Christians and Muslims.

In 2009, Pope Benedict XVI addressed the Synod for Africa during a visit to Cameroon and Angola with a message ending in a prayer to Our Lady of Africa. Pope Leo XIV visited the Algerian basilica during his visit to the continent in 2026.

== Devotion ==
The feast of Our Lady of Africa is celebrated on April 30 and is celebrated as a solemnity in Northern Africa, occasioning obligatory attendance of Mass. It is also included in the liturgical calendars of the Catholic Church in Nigeria, Kenya, and Southern Africa. The White Fathers also treat the day as a major feast and have provided liturgical texts for the celebration outside of Africa.

The devotion has gained traction across the African continent, as well as in the African diaspora. Churches under the title have been established around the world, including in the United States (where a church was renamed in her honor in Chicago in 2021). Notre Dame D'Afrique, Bangui is located in the Central African Republic, and the Our Mother of Africa Chapel was completed in Washington, D.C., in 1997.

As the devotion has spread across the world, the original statue in Algiers has not been the exclusive representation of the Marian title. As such, it has become associated with various Black representations of the Virgin Mary.

== Public Holidays ==
=== Spain ===
In Spain, 'Our Lady of Africa' (officially in Spanish: 'Nuestra Señora de África') is officially recognised in Spanish law (Resolución de 17 de octubre de 2025: BOE-A-2025-21667) and celebrated as a public holiday in the autonomous city of Ceuta (Spanish: Ciudad de Ceuta) on the North African coast along with Eid al-Adha (officially named in la Cuidad de Ceuta as 'Fiesta Sacrificio-Eidul Adha'), a second dedicated public holiday.

== Churches ==
=== Major shrine ===
- Notre-Dame d'Afrique, Algiers, Algeria

=== Churches and other shrines ===
- Notre Dame D'Afrique, Bangui, Central African Republic
- Shrine of Our Lady of Africa, Abidjan, Ivory Coast
- Our Lady Queen of Africa Cathedral, El-Obeid, Sudan
- Mémorial Notre Dame d’Afrique, Théoule-sur-Mer, France
- Our Lady of Africa Cathedral, Kitui, Kenya
- Our Mother of Africa Chapel, Washington, D.C., United States
- Our Mother of Africa Catholic Church, Chicago, United States
- Our Lady of Africa Parish, Kitwe, Zambia

== Gallery ==
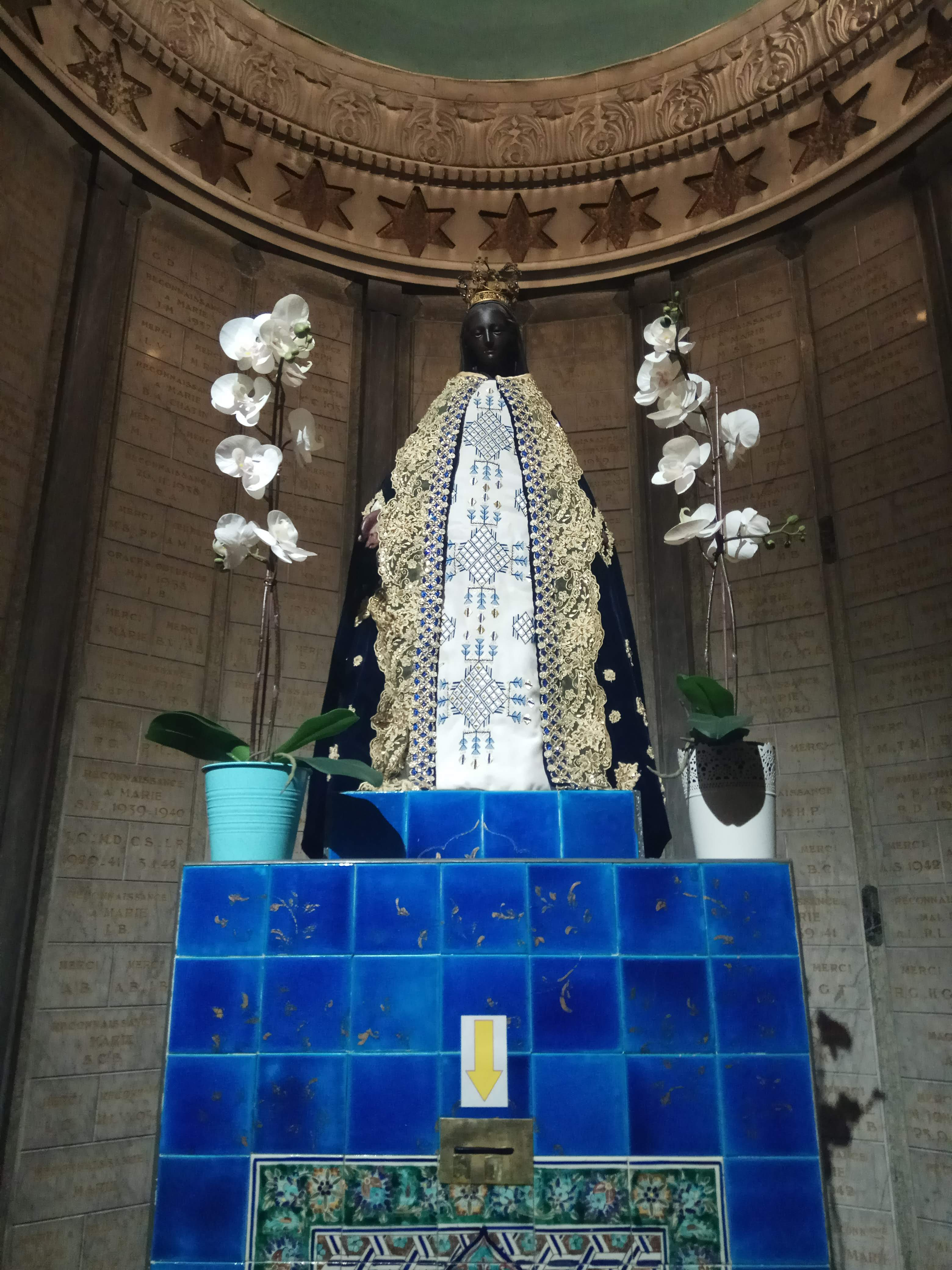
Statue of Our Lady of Africa (Notre-Dame d'Afrique) in Lyons

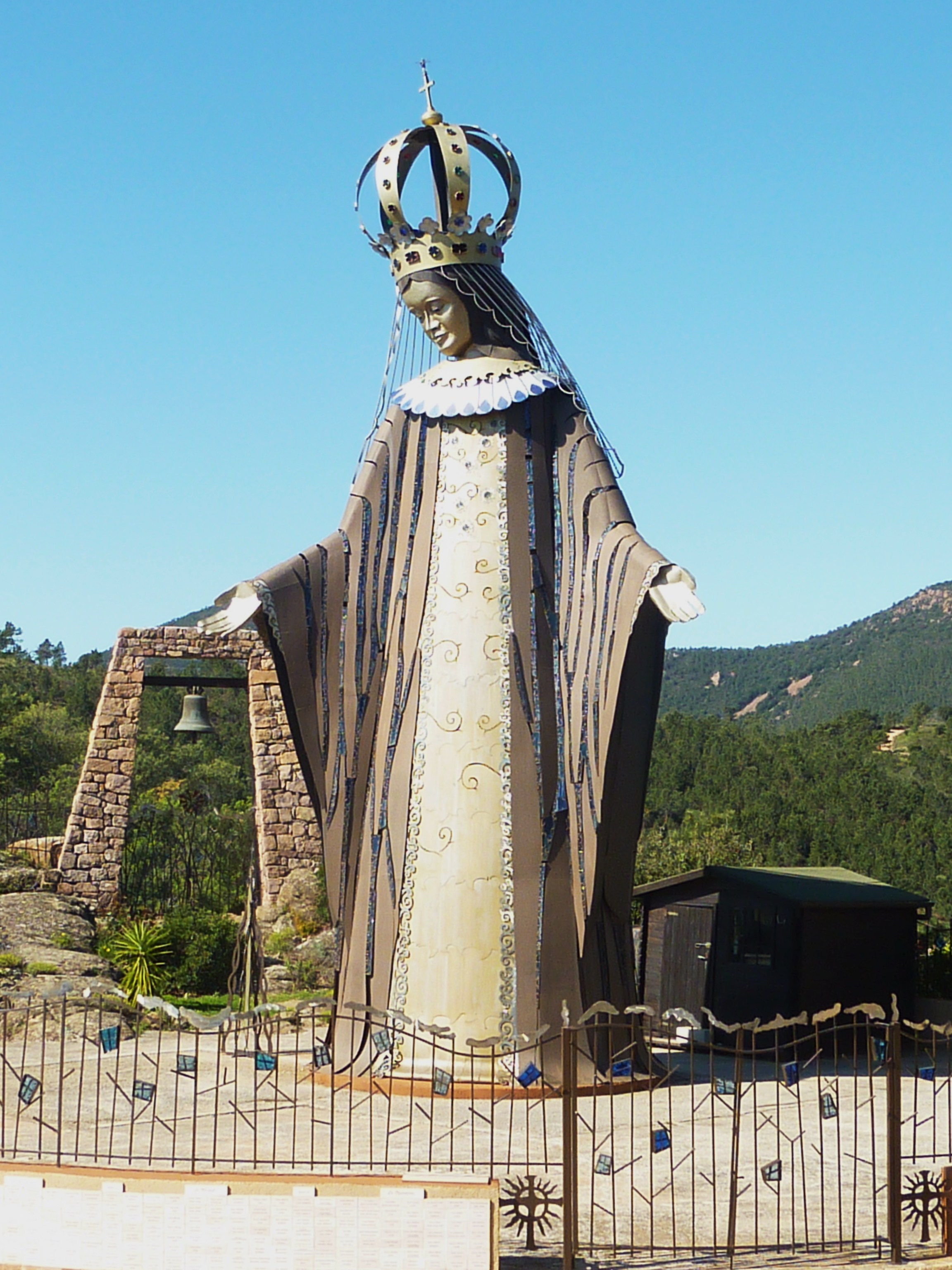
Mémorial Notre Dame d’Afrique, Théoule sur Mer

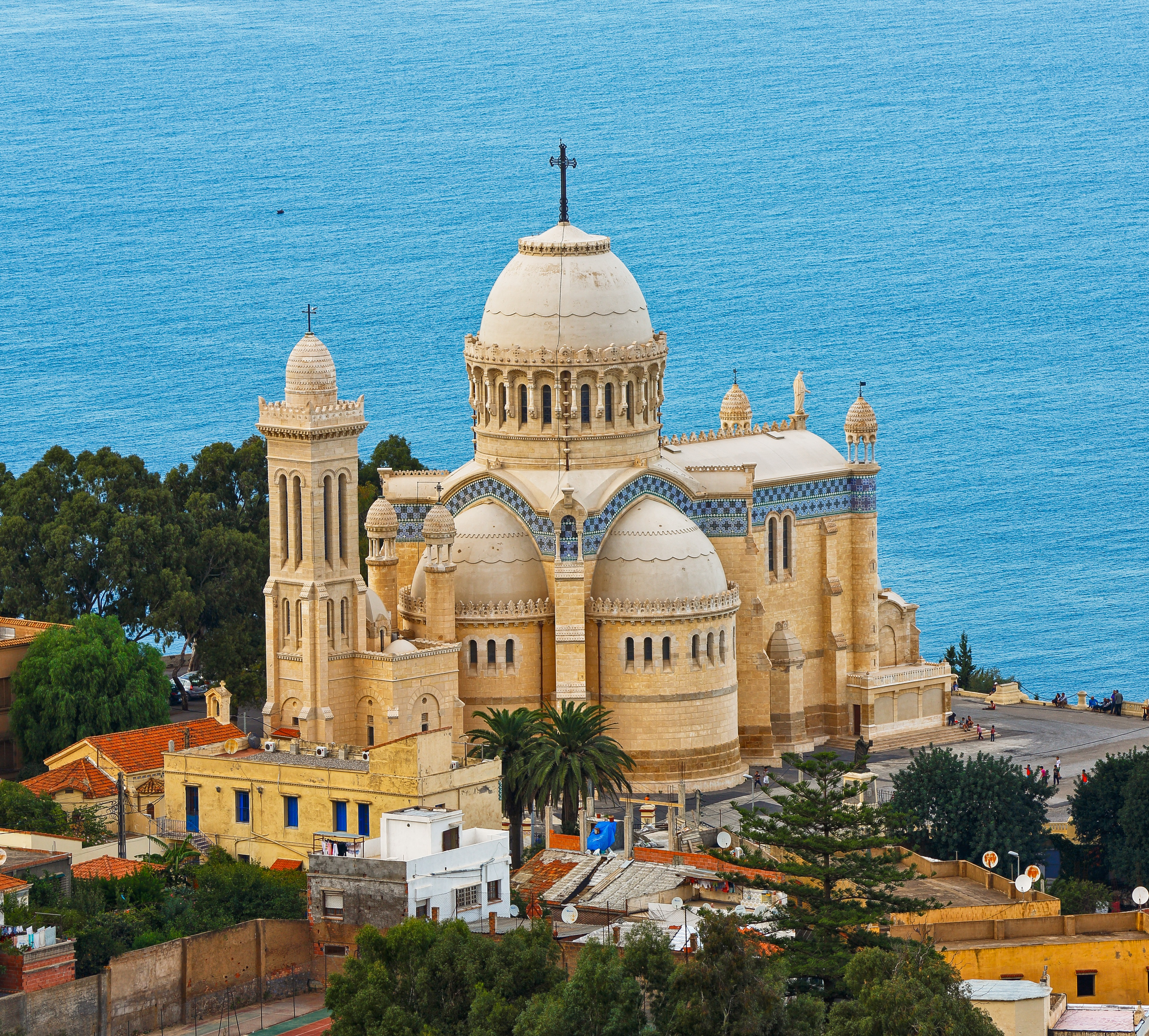
Basilica of Notre-Dame d'Afrique in Algiers

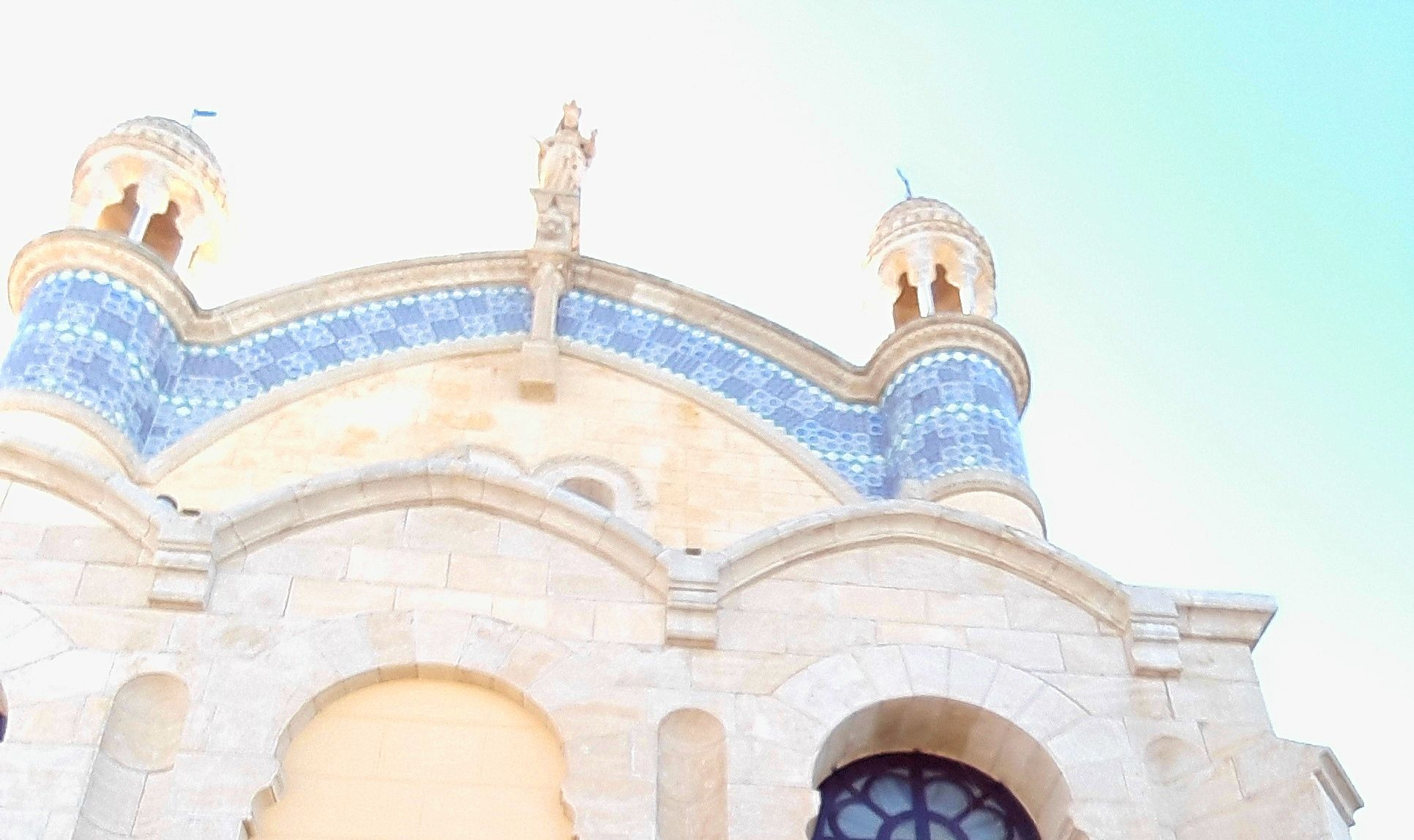
Exterior statue at Notre Dame d'Afrique basilica in Algiers.

== See also ==
- Notre-Dame d'Afrique
- Shrines to the Virgin Mary
- White Fathers
- Cardinal Charles Lavigerie
- Our Lady of Kibeho
- Our Lady of Zeitoun
- Black Madonna
