= Academy of Our Lady =

Academy of Our Lady may refer to:

- The Academy of Our Lady of Peace — an all-girls high school in San Diego, San Diego County, California, and founded in 1882
- Academy of Our Lady of Mercy, Lauralton Hall — a high school in Milford, New Haven County, Connecticut and founded in 1905
- Academy of Our Lady of Guam — a high school in Hagåtña on the U.S. island of Guam and established in 1949
- Academy of Our Lady (Chicago) — a former grade school and high school in Chicago, Cook County, Illinois, also known as Longwood Academy, founded in 1875, and closed in 1999, the location later used for a campus of Chicago International Charter School
- Academy of Our Lady/Spalding Institute — a former high school in Peoria, Peoria County, Illinois, formed by the 1973 merger of all-girls Academy of Our Lady, founded in 1863, and all-boys Spalding Institute, and later closed in a merger into Peoria Notre Dame High School
- Academy of Our Lady (Louisiana) — a high school in Marrero, Jefferson Parish, Louisiana, formed in 2007 by the merger of Archbishop Blenk High School and Immaculata High School
- Academy of Our Lady of Good Counsel — an all-girls high school in White Plains, Westchester County, New York and founded in 1922
- Academia del Perpetuo Socorro — a grade and high school in the Miramar neighborhood of the Santurce district of San Juan, Puerto Rico, founded in 1921, and sometimes called "Academy of Our Lady of Perpetual Help" in English

== See also ==
- Our Lady (disambiguation)
