= Notre-Dame d'Afrique =

Catholic basilica in Algeria

Basilique Notre-Dame d'Afrique
- السيدة الإفريقية; Basilica of Our Lady of Africa
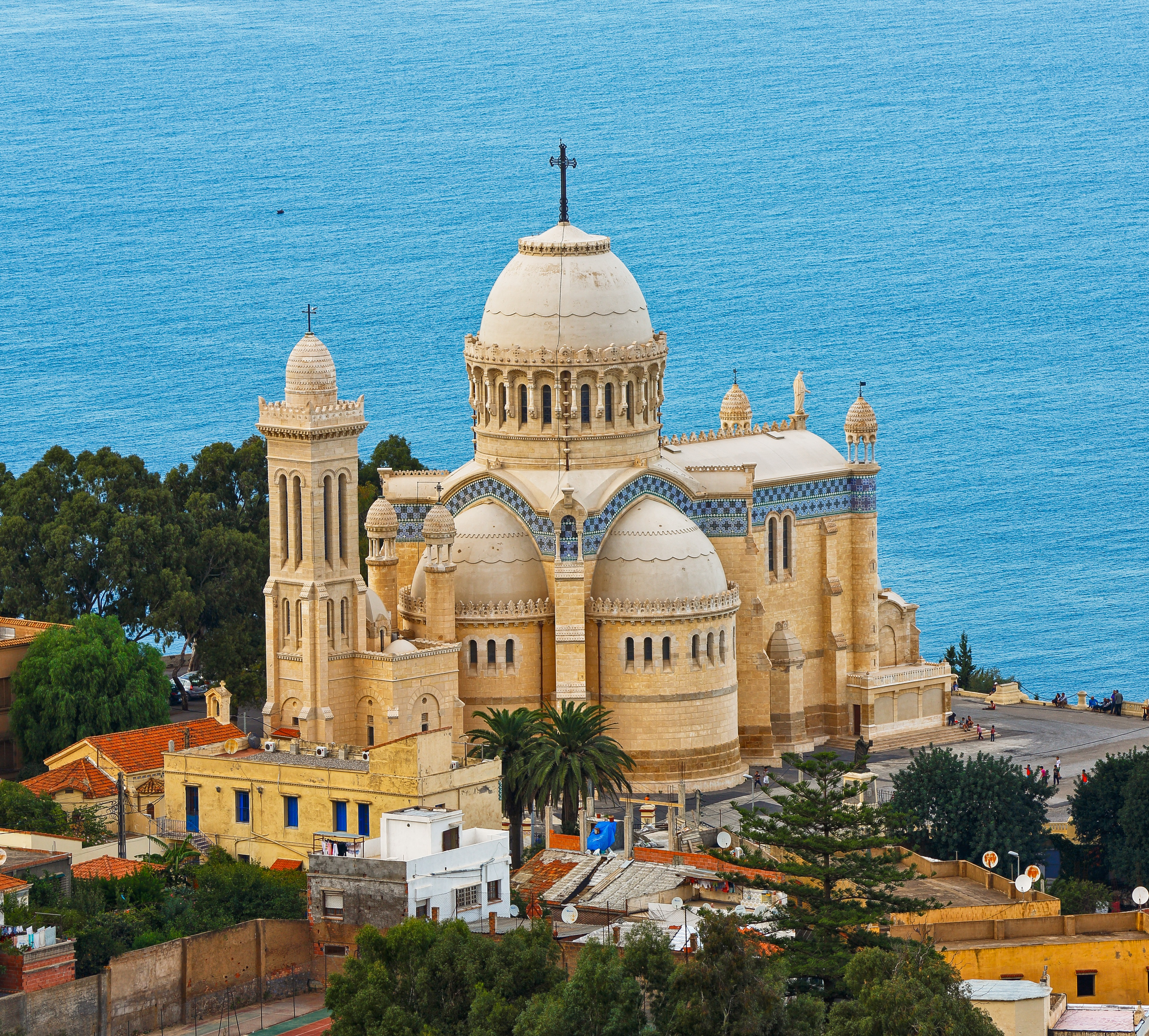
- Notre Dame d'Afrique

- Location in Algeria

Religion
- Affiliation: Catholic Church (Latin Church)
- District: Archdiocese of Algiers
- Rite: Roman Rite
- Ecclesiastical or organisational status: Minor basilica

Location
- Location: Algiers, Algeria
- Coordinates: 36°48′04″N 3°02′33″E

Architecture
- Architect: Jean-Eugène Fromageau
- Type: Church
- Style: Byzantine Revival
- Groundbreaking: 1858
- Completed: 1872

Website
- notre-dame-afrique.org

The Basilique Notre Dame d'Afrique (English: Basilica of Our Lady of Africa) is a Catholic basilica in Algiers, Algeria. It is the origin of the modern Catholic devotion to Our Lady of Africa.

Pope Pius IX granted two Pontifical decrees towards the shrine on the same day on 15 April 1876. The first decree invoked to canonically crown the venerated Marian image enshrined within. The coronation rites was executed by the Archbishop of Carthage Charles Lavigerie on 30 April 1876. The second decree which raised the sanctuary to the status of Basilica based on an "immemorial custom"; Pope Benedict XV later regulated to limit these privileges in 1918 to Papal edicts unless an ancient custom already refers to a building as a "Basilica".

== History ==
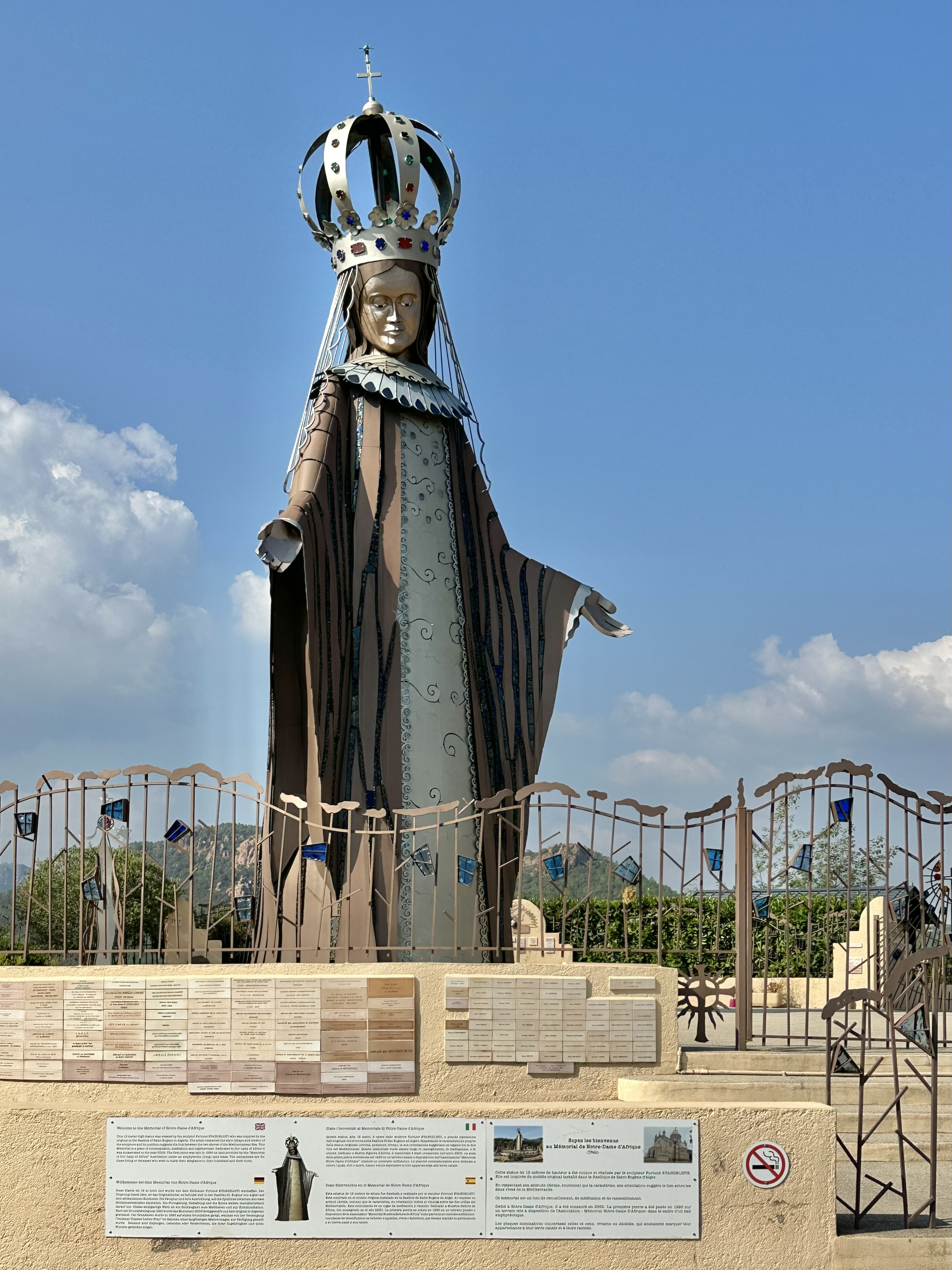
Our Lady of Africa.

Louis-Antoine-Augustin Pavy, who served as the Bishop of Algiers from 1846 to 1866, paved the way for the construction of the basilica. It was inaugurated in 1872, after fourteen years of construction. It was founded by Charles Lavigerie. Its architect, Jean-Eugène Fromageau, who had been appointed the chief architect for ecclesiastical buildings in French Algeria in 1859, employed a Neo-Byzantine style. Its floor plan is unusual as the choir is situated on the southeast instead of the usual east side of the building.

The basilica contains 46 stained glass windows installed in the 19th century. They were blown out during a bombing of the area in April 1943 and have been restored twice since the end of World War II.

In 1930 an organ, built in 1911, was donated to the basilica by the wife of the late Albert Weddell, a wealthy English resident in Algiers at Villa Georges and friend of the French composer Camille Saint-Saëns who had inaugurated the organ at Weddell's home.

The basilica was damaged by the 2003 Boumerdès earthquake. A reconstruction project was initiated by Archbishop Henri Teissier in 2003, but work on the project did not start until the spring of 2007. The total cost of restoration was €5.1 million. The project took three years to complete.

Notre Dame d'Afrique holds a daily mass at 18:00, with the Friday mass taking place at 10.30 instead. Mass also takes place in different languages throughout the month.

Today the basilica regularly hosts cultural activities, such as music concerts and exhibitions.

== Location ==
Notre Dame d'Afrique is on the north side of Algiers, on a 124 m (407 ft) cliff overlooking the Bay of Algiers. It formerly could be reached from the city centre by a cable car. It can be considered to be the counter-piece to the church of Notre-Dame de la Garde on the other side of the Mediterranean.

== Importance ==
Its symbolic and religious importance can be summed up by the inscription on the apse: Notre Dame d'Afrique priez pour nous et pour les Musulmans ("Our Lady of Africa, pray for us and for the Muslims").

== Gallery ==
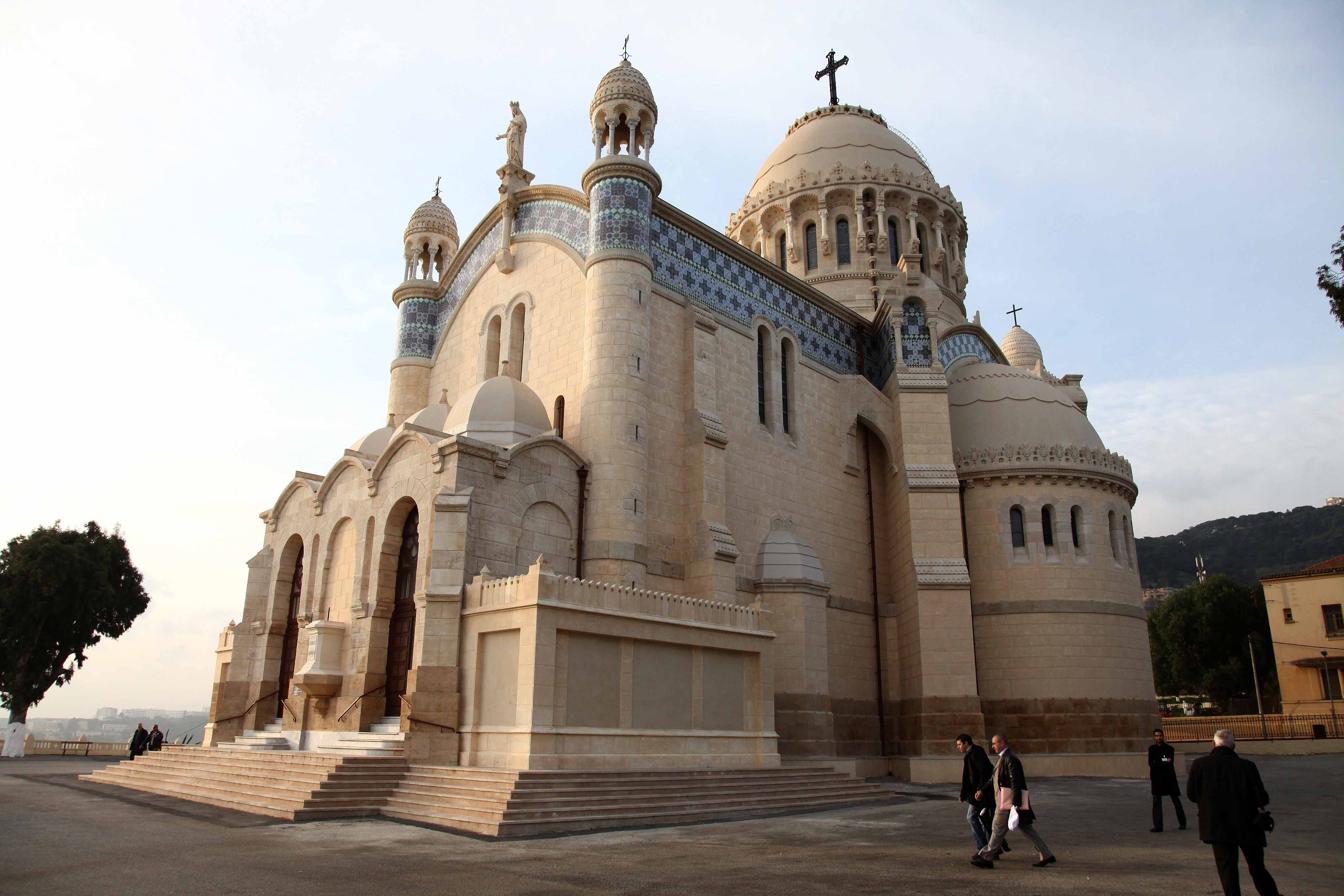

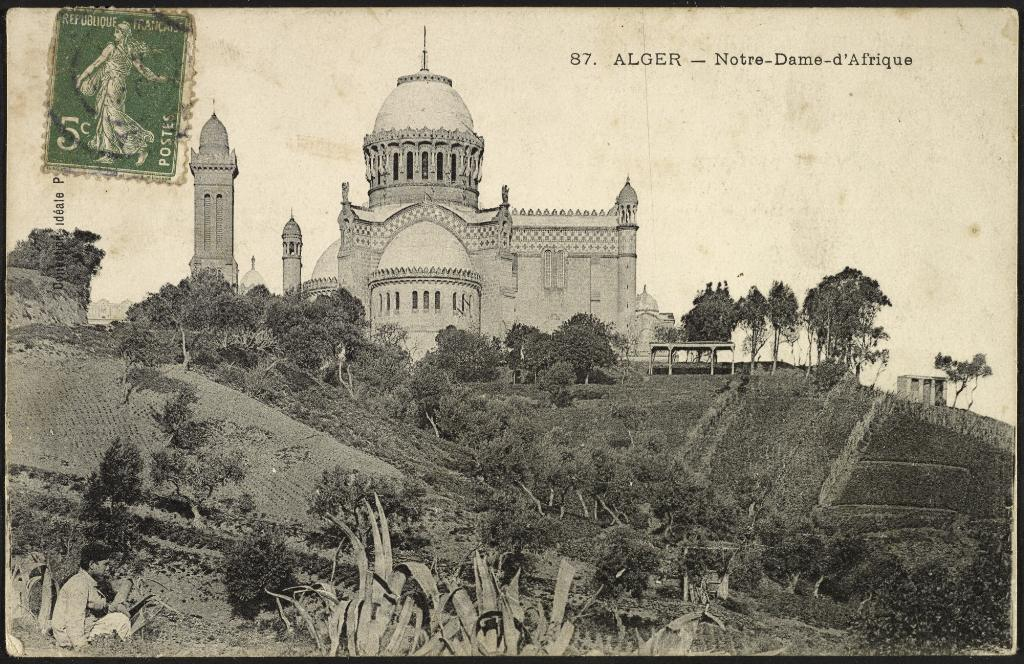

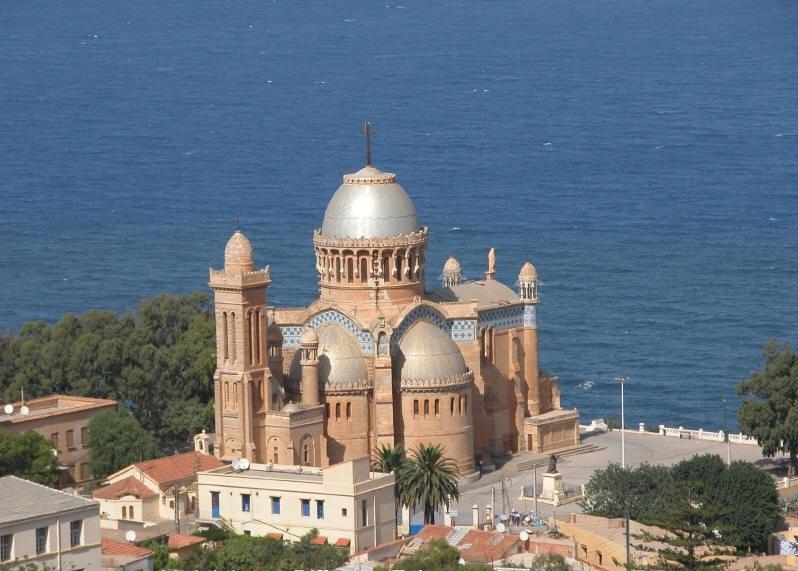

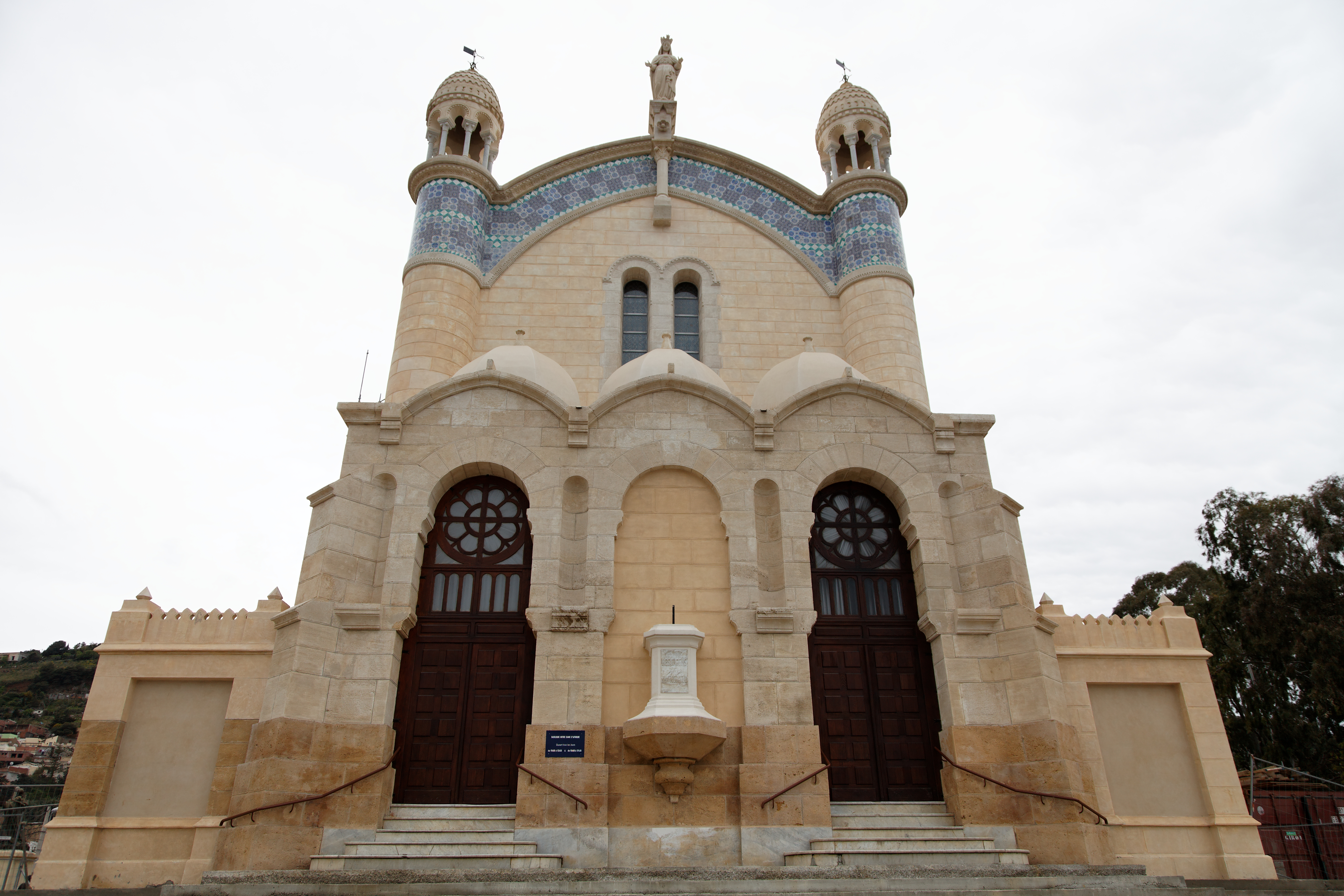

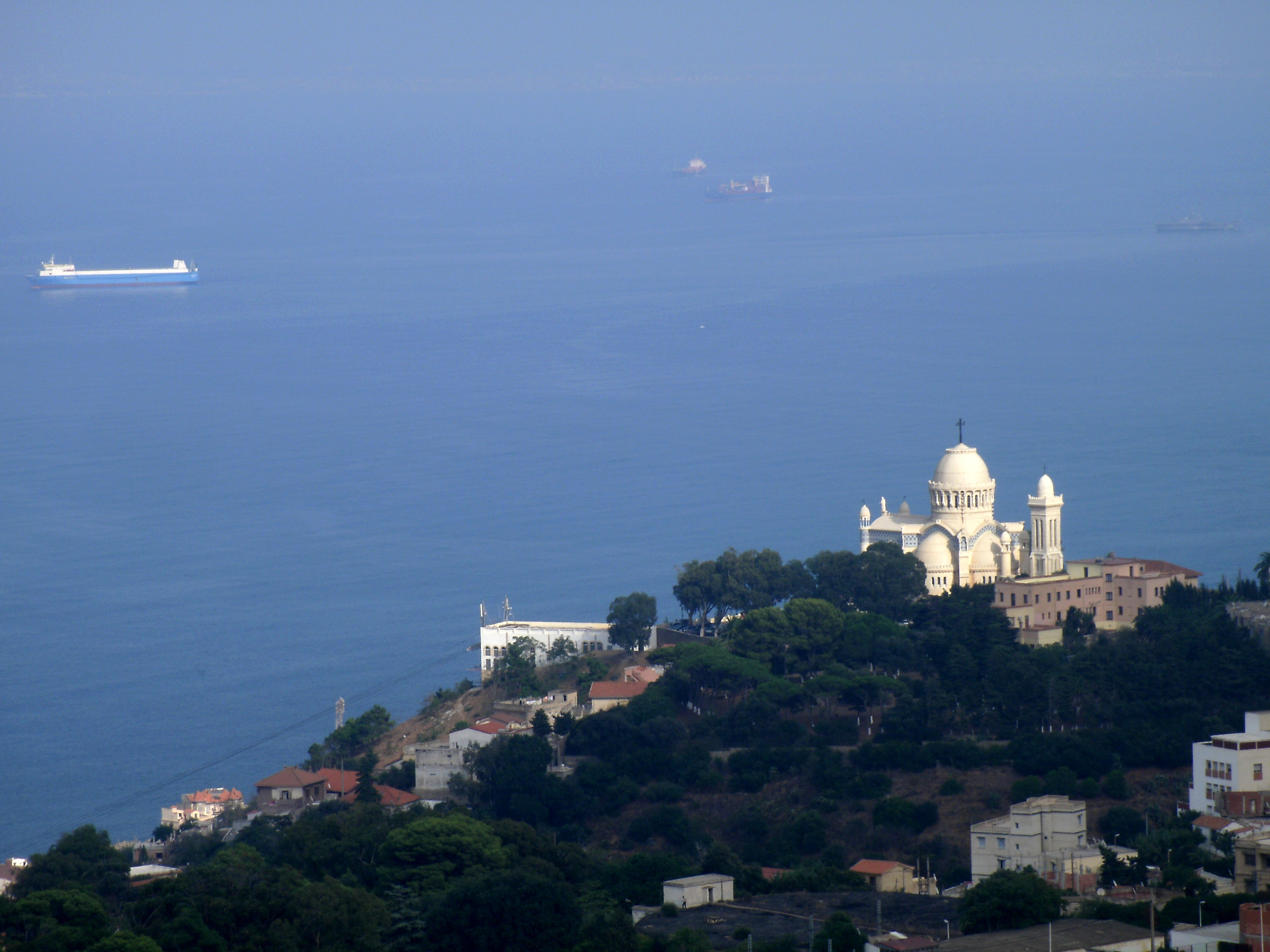

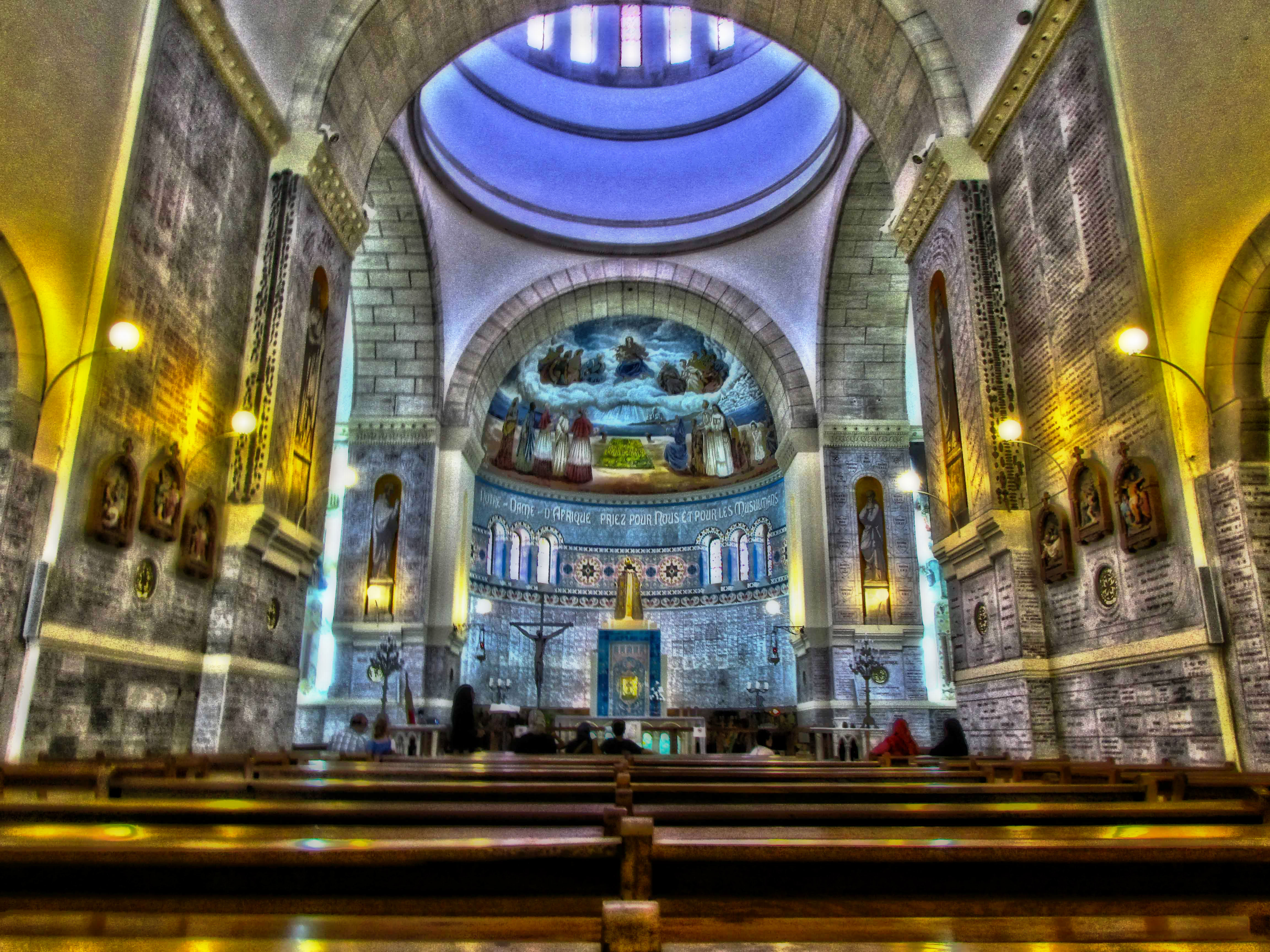

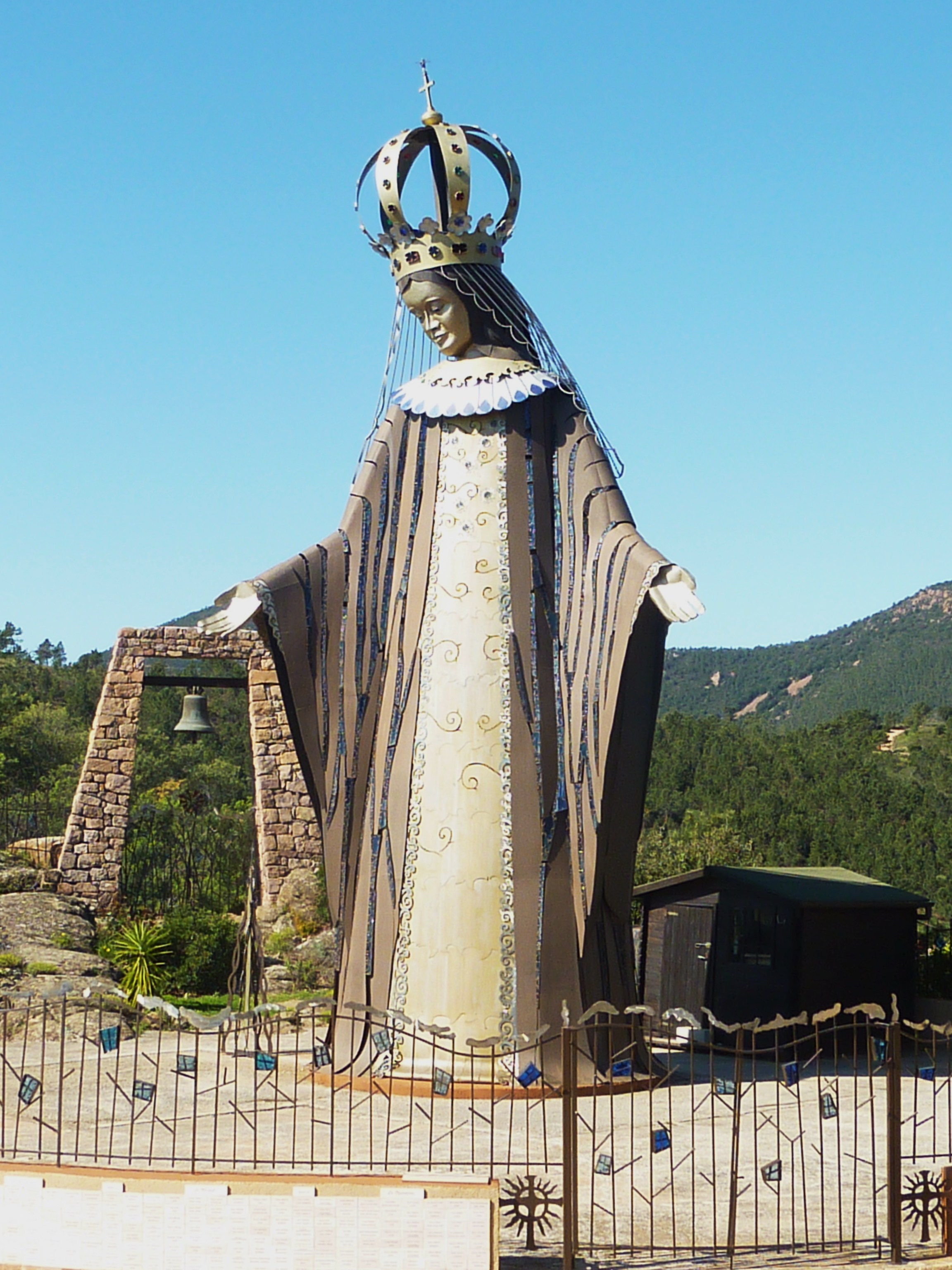

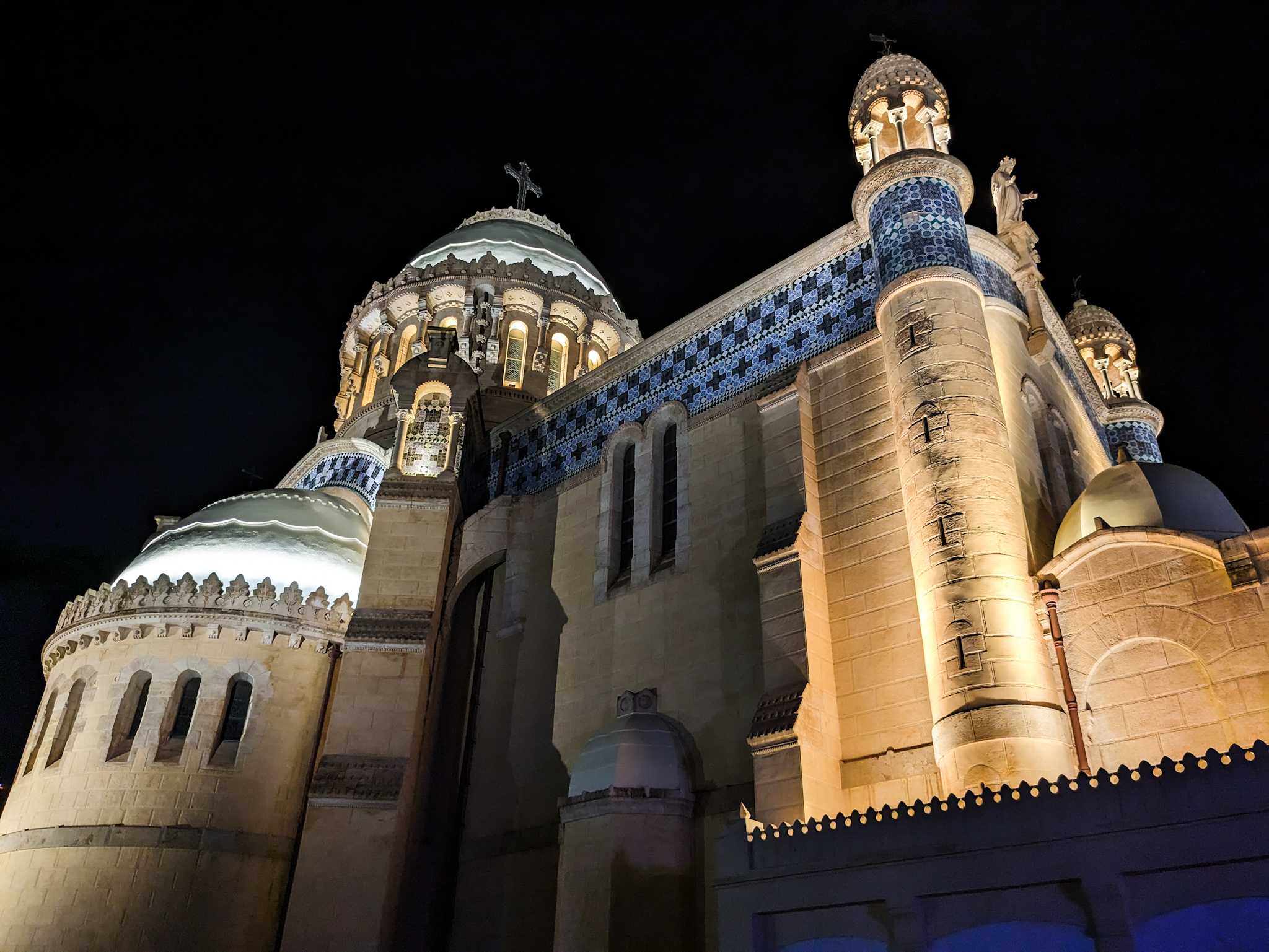

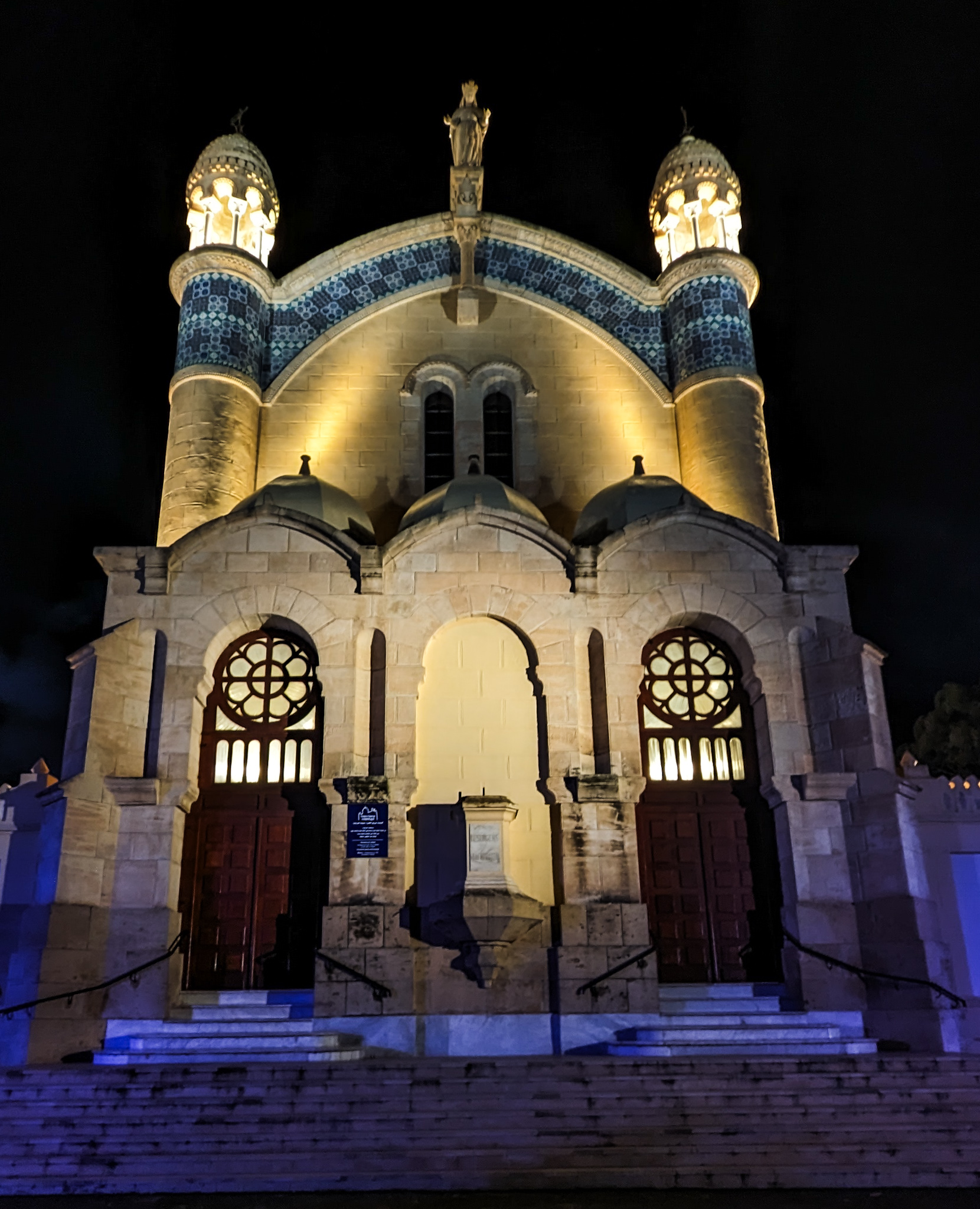

"...a pilgrimage-church for sick persons and mariners, founded by Card. Lavigerie in 1872, [which] rises conspicuously on a spur of the N.E. slope of Mont Bouzaréah, above the Christian and the Jewish burial-grounds."

— Baedeker, The Mediterranean, seaports and sea routes: Handbook for Travellers
