= Our Mother of Africa Chapel =

- Our Mother of Africa Shrine
- Location within Washington, D.C. Location within the United States
- 38°56′0″N 77°0′02″W
- Location: 400 Michigan Ave NE, Washington, DC 20017
- Country: United States
- Denomination: Catholic Church

History
- Dedication: Our Lady of Africa
- Dedicated: August 30, 1997; 28 years ago

Architecture
- Architect: Ed Dwight

Specifications
- Length: 30 feet (9.1 m)
- Width: 10 feet (3.0 m)

Administration
- Archdiocese: Archdiocese of Washington

Clergy
- Archbishop: Cardinal Wilton Daniel Gregory

The Our Mother of Africa Chapel is a shrine housed in the Basilica of the National Shrine of the Immaculate Conception in Washington, D.C. It was built in the 1990s after a fundraising appeal sponsored by the National Black Catholic Congress, and was dedicated in 1997.

It features a large bronze statue of Our Mother of Africa, a Madonna and Child figure styled with Sub-Saharan African features, designed by Ed Dwight. Other sculptures flank the chapel and represent various aspects of African-American culture and history.

== History ==
The shrine was constructed under the auspices of the National Black Catholic Congress, which had been debating about a fundraising effort and what to do with it. A series of ideas were proposed, including a new Black Catholic hymnal, an expanded liturgical program, and other possibilities.

Bishop John Ricard, SSJ, then-president of the NBCC, joined with other leaders to opt for a shrine inside the Basilica of the National Shrine of the Immaculate Conception, at the cost of $400,000. The Knights of Peter Claver and Ladies Auxiliary contributed to the chapel's construction.

The chapel was placed near the back of the basilica and was dedicated on August 30, 1997, before a crowd of onlookers during a Gospel Mass celebration.

== Description ==
The main feature, a bronze Black Madonna and Child, was designed by Ed Dwight, and this figure is flanked by the four Gospel authors. Nearby is an altar, behind which stands a Black Jesus crucifix with a Christ figure carved from ebony wood by Juvenal Kaliki and a cross sculpted by Jeffrey Brosk.

A bas relief panel in the chapel, also designed by Dwight, depicts "the ancestors", a group of figures representing Black historical figures (including slaves). The large columns in the chapel represent the seven values of Kwanzaa, the Nguzo Saba.

Other sculptors involved in the chapel artwork include Giancarlo Biagi, Jill Burkee, and Jean Wiart. Dwight was the only African-American sculptor involved.

== See also ==
- Basilica of the National Shrine of the Immaculate Conception
- National Black Catholic Congress
- Bishop John Ricard
- Black Catholicism
