= Notre Dame D'Afrique, Bangui =

Notre Dame D'Afrique
- Notre Dame D'Afrique, Bangui
- Notre Dame D'Afrique
- 4.39786°N 18.55727°E
- Location: Bangui
- Country: Central African Republic
- Denomination: Roman Catholic Church

Notre Dame D'Afrique is a Catholic church situated in Bangui in the Central African Republic (CAR). It is 5km away from the city center in the largest and popular neighborhood known as KM5. It was established under the patronage of Our Lady of Africa.
