= Jean-Eugène Fromageau =

French architect

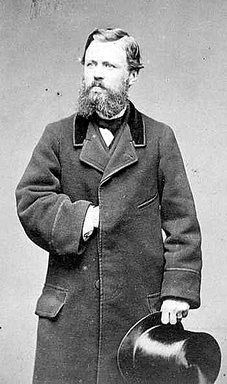
- Born: 30 March 1822; Saumur, France
- Died: 16 October 1897 (aged 75)
- Education: École des Beaux-Arts

Jean-Eugène Fromageau (30 March 1822 - 16 October 1897) was a French architect active in French Algeria. He served as the ecclesiastical architect of the Roman Catholic Archdiocese of Algiers from 1855 to 1870. He designed several church buildings, including Notre Dame d'Afrique.

== Early life ==
Jean-Eugène Fromageau was born in 1822 in Saumur, France. He studied architecture at the École des Beaux-Arts.

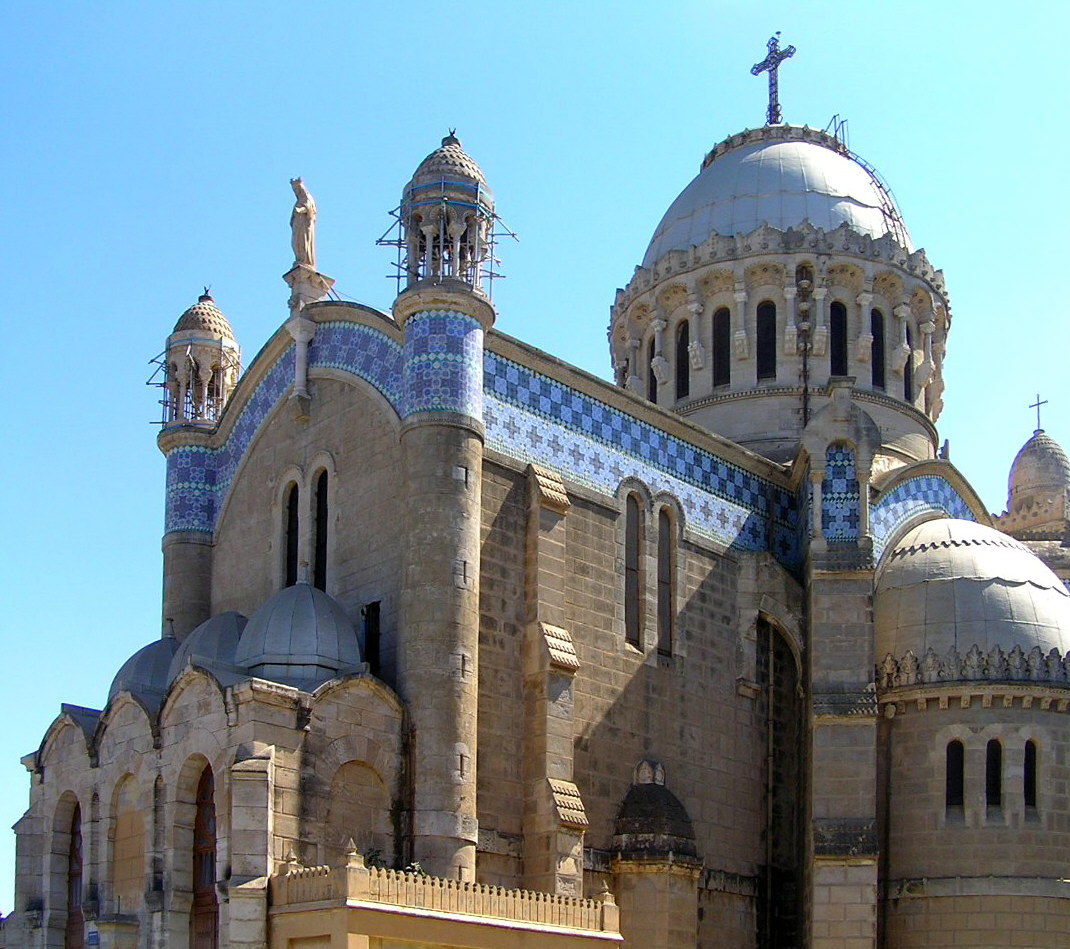
Notre Dame d'Afrique, designed by Fromageau.

== Career ==
Fromageau served as the ecclesiastical architect of the Roman Catholic Archdiocese of Algiers from 1855 to 1870. He remodelled the Ketchaoua Mosque into the Cathedral of St. Philippe. He also designed Notre Dame d'Afrique in the Neo Byzantine architectural style. Additionally, he designed a seminary in Kouba and another one in Saint-Eugène, two suburbs of Algiers.

Upon his return to France, Fromageau designed the Roman Catholic church in Saint-Jouin-de-Milly. He was a member of the Architectural Society of Anjou.

== Death ==
Fromageau died in 1897.
