= Index of Washington, D.C.–related articles =

Washington, D.C. (officially the District of Columbia), is the capital city and federal district of the United States. Below is a list of Washington, D.C.-related articles.

== 0–9 ==
- .dc.us
- 51st state
- 14th Street (Washington, D.C.)
- 1600 Pennsylvania Avenue
- 16th Street Bridge

== A ==
- Adams Morgan
- African-American historic places in Washington, D.C.
- African-American newspapers in Washington, D.C.
- Airports serving Washington, D.C.
- Alcoholic Beverage and Cannabis Administration
- American University
  - Park
  - people
- Anacostia
- Anacostia Community Museum
- The Anthem (music venue)
  - Concerts
- Arboretum
- Area codes 202 and 771
- Ariel Rios Federal Building
- Arthur M. Sackler Gallery
- Arts and Industries Building
- Artworks commemorating African Americans in Washington, D.C.
- Association of the Oldest Inhabitants of the District of Columbia

== B ==
- Ballot measures in Washington, D.C.
- Barnaby Woods
- Barney Circle
- Barry Farm
- Baseball parks in Washington, D.C.
- Basilica of the National Shrine of the Immaculate Conception
- Bellevue
- Benning
- Benning Heights
- Benning Ridge
- Berkley
- Birds of the District of Columbia
- Bloomingdale
- Botanical gardens and arboretums in Washington, D.C.
- Boundary markers of the original District of Columbia
- Brentwood
- Breweries in Washington, D.C.
- Bridges documented by the Historic American Engineering Record in Washington, D.C.
- Bridges on the National Register of Historic Places in Washington, D.C.
- Brightwood
- Brightwood Park
- Brookland
- Burials at the Congressional Cemetery
- Burials at Oak Hill Cemetery
- Burleith
- Burrville
- Buzzard Point

== C ==
- Capital Beltway
- Capitalsaurus
- Capitol Hill
- Capitol Power Plant
- Capitol Reflecting Pool
- Capitol View
- Carnegie libraries in Washington, D.C.
- Carver Langston
- Cathedral Heights
- Catholic University Cardinals
  - head football coaches
- Catholic University of America
  - buildings
  - people
- Central Northeast
- Chevy Chase
- Chinatown
- Circles in Washington, D.C.
- Cities in the Baltimore–Washington metropolitan area
- Civic Betterment
- Civil War Defenses of Washington
- Cleveland Park
- Climate change in Washington, D.C.
- College athletic programs in Washington, D.C.
- Colleges and universities in Washington, D.C.
- Colonial Village
- Colony Hill
- Columbia Heights
- Columbia Island
- Columbus School of Law
- Committee on the District of Columbia
- Congress Heights
- District of Columbia's congressional delegations
- Corcoran College of Art and Design
- Cosmos Club members
- Council of the District of Columbia
- Crestwood
- Crime in Washington, D.C.
- Cultural Tourism DC
- Culture of Washington, D.C.

== D ==
- D.C. Statehood Green Party
- D.C. United
  - first-round draft pics
  - head coaches
  - history
  - records and statistics
  - seasons
- D.C. United Hall of Tradition
- D.C. United Holdings
- D.C. United Academy
- David A. Clarke School of Law
- DC State Fair
- Deanwood
- Demographics of Washington, D.C.
- Dignitaries at the state funeral of John F. Kennedy
- Diplomatic missions in Washington, D.C.
- District of Columbia's at-large congressional district
- District of Columbia Board of Elections and Ethics
- District of Columbia City Hall
- District of Columbia Compensated Emancipation Act
- District of Columbia Court of Appeals
- District of Columbia Democratic State Committee
- District of Columbia Financial Control Board
- District of Columbia home rule
- District of Columbia Home Rule Act
- District of Columbia National Guard
  - Air
  - Army
  - Honor Guard
- District of Columbia Office of Campaign Finance
- District of Columbia Olympic Committee
- District of Columbia Organic Act of 1801
- District of Columbia Organic Act of 1871
- District of Columbia Protective Services Police Department
- District of Columbia Public Library
- District of Columbia Public Schools
- District of Columbia Public Service Commission
- District of Columbia Republican Party
- District of Columbia retrocession
- District of Columbia Route 4
- District of Columbia Route 295
- District of Columbia School Reform Act of 1995
- District of Columbia State Board of Education
- District of Columbia statehood movement
- District of Columbia statistical areas
- District of Columbia symbols
- District of Columbia Urban Debate League
- District of Columbia voting rights
- District of Columbia Voting Rights Amendment
- District of Columbia War Memorial
- District of Columbia Water and Sewer Authority
- Douglass
- Downtown
- Dupont Circle
- Dupont Park

== E ==
- East Potomac Park
- East River Heights
- Eastland Gardens
- Eckington
- Economy of Washington, D.C.
- Edgewood
- Education in Washington, D.C.
- Elections in District of Columbia

== F ==
- Fairfax Village
- Fairlawn
- Federal Triangle
- Federation of Citizens Associations of the District of Columbia
- Flag of the District of Columbia
- Foggy Bottom
- Forest Hills
- Fort Davis
- Fort Dupont
  - Park
- Fort Lincoln
- Fort Stanton
  - neighborhood
- Fort Totten
- Foxhall
- Fossiliferous stratigraphic units in Washington, D.C.
- Freedom Plaza
- Frederick Douglass National Historic Site
- Freer Gallery of Art
- Friendship Heights

== G ==
- Gallaudet University
- Garfield Heights
- Gateway
- Geography of Washington, D.C.
- George Washington University
  - alumni
  - Law School
- Georgetown
- Georgetown street renaming
- Georgetown Hoyas
  - men's basketball seasons
  - men's basketball head coaches
  - in the NFL draft
  - in the NBA and WNBA drafts
- Georgetown University
  - alumni
  - buildings
  - Law Center
    - alumni
  - presidents
- Glover Park
- Good Hope
- Government of the District of Columbia
- Greenway

== H ==
- Hains Point
- Harry S Truman Building
- Hawthorne
- Heliports in Washington, D.C.
- Herbert C. Hoover Building
- High schools in the District of Columbia
- Hillbrook
- Hillcrest
- Hirshhorn Museum and Sculpture Garden
- History of Washington, D.C.
- Hospitals in Washington, D.C.
- Hotels in Washington, D.C.
- Howard Bison
  - football seasons
  - in the NFL draft
- Howard University
  - people

== I ==
- Incidents of political violence in Washington, D.C.
- Institute of World Politics
- Interstate Highways in Washington, D.C.
  - Interstate 66
  - Interstate 95
  - Interstate 295 (Maryland–District of Columbia)
  - Interstate 395 (Virginia–District of Columbia)
  - Interstate 695 (District of Columbia)
- Islands of Washington, D.C.
- Ivy City

== J ==
- J. Edgar Hoover Building
- James Madison Memorial Building
- John A. Wilson Building
- John Adams Building
- Judiciary Square

== K ==
- Kalorama Triangle
- Kenilworth
- Kenilworth Park and Aquatic Gardens
- Kent
- Kingman Park

== L ==
- Lanier Heights
- Langdon
- Law enforcement agencies in the District of Columbia
- LeDroit Park
- L'Enfant Plan
- L'Enfant Plaza
- Libertarian Party of the District of Columbia
- Library of Congress
- Lincoln Heights
- Lincoln Memorial Reflecting Pool
- Lincoln Park
- Logan Circle

== M ==
- Manor Park
- Marshall Heights
- Mary E. Switzer Memorial Building
- Massachusetts Heights
- Mayfair
- Mayors of Washington, D.C.
- McLean Gardens
- Media in Washington, D.C.
- Members of the Council of the District of Columbia
- Meridian Hill
- Metrobus routes (Washington, D.C.)
- Metrobus routes in Washington, D.C.
- Metropolitan Police Department of the District of Columbia
- Michigan Park
- Miss District of Columbia
- Miss District of Columbia Teen USA
- Miss District of Columbia USA
- Mount Pleasant
- Mount Vernon Square
- Mount Vernon Triangle
- Museums in Washington, D.C.
- Music of Washington, D.C.

== N ==
- National Air and Space Museum
- National Defense University
- National War College
- National Gallery of Art
- National Historic Landmarks in Washington, D.C.
- National House of Prayer
- National Mall
- National Mall and Memorial Parks
- National Museum of African American History and Culture
- National Museum of African Art
- National Museum of American History
- National Museum of the American Indian
- National Museum of Natural History
- National Portrait Gallery
- National Postal Museum
- National Register of Historic Places listings in Washington, D.C.
  - in Northeast Quadrant
  - in Southeast Quadrant
  - in the upper NW Quadrant
  - in western Washington, D.C.
- National Sylvan Theater
- Navy Yard
- Naylor Gardens
- Near Northeast
- Neighborhoods in Washington, D.C.
- Newspapers in Washington, D.C.
- Newspapers founded in Washington, D.C., during the 18th- and 19th-centuries
- NoMa
- North Cleveland Park
- North Michigan Park
- Northeast
- Northeast Boundary
- Northwest
- Number One Observatory Circle
- Numbered highways in Washington, D.C.

== O ==
- Observatory Circle
- Old Executive Office Building
- Old Patent Office Building
- Old Post Office Building (Washington, D.C.)

== P ==
- Painters in the National Gallery of Art
- Palisades
- Park Naylor
- Park View
- Parks at Walter Reed
- Parks in the Baltimore–Washington metropolitan area
- Parochial and private schools in the Washington metropolitan area
- Patent Office 1836 fire
- Patent Office 1877 fire
- Paul H. Nitze School of Advanced International Studies
- Penn Branch
- Penn Quarter
- People from Washington, D.C.
- Petworth
- The Plan (Washington, D.C.)
- Pleasant Hill
- Pleasant Plains
- Pontifical Faculty of the Immaculate Conception
- Postal Square Building
- Potomac Heights
- Potomac River
- Public art in Washington, D.C.
  - Ward 1
  - Ward 2
  - Ward 3
  - Ward 4
  - Ward 5
  - Ward 6
  - Ward 7
  - Ward 8

== Q ==
- Quadrants of Washington, D.C.
- Queens Chapel

== R ==
- Radio stations in Washington, D.C.
- Railroads in Washington, D.C.
- Rallies and protest marches in Washington, D.C.
- Randle Highlands
- Registered Historic Places in the District of Columbia
- Recognition of same-sex unions in the District of Columbia
- Reportedly haunted locations in the District of Columbia
- Residence Act
- Retrocession of the District of Columbia
- Riggs Park
- River Terrace
- Rivers of Washington, D.C.
- Robert F. Kennedy Department of Justice Building
- Rock Creek and Potomac Parkway
- Rock Creek Park
- Ronald Reagan Building

== S ==
- S. Dillon Ripley Center
- Schools in the Roman Catholic Archdiocese of Washington
- Scouting in Washington, D.C.
- Seal of the District of Columbia
- Shadow congressperson
- Shaw
- Sheridan-Kalorama
- Shepherd Park
- Shipley Terrace
- Sixteenth Street Heights
- Skyland
- Smithsonian Institution
- Southeast
- Southeastern University (Washington, D.C.)
- Southwest
- Southwest Federal Center
- Southwest Waterfront
- Speakers at The Economic Club of Washington, D.C.
- Sports in Washington, D.C.
- Spring Valley
- St. Elizabeths Hospital
  - campus
- Statues of the National Statuary Hall Collection
- Strayer University
- Streetcars in Washington, D.C.
- Streets and highways of Washington, D.C.
  - State-named roadways in Washington, D.C.
- Stronghold
- Superfund sites in Washington, D.C.
- Superior Court of the District of Columbia
- Supreme Court of the United States of America
- Sursum Corda
- Swampoodle

== T ==
- Takoma
- Tallest buildings in Washington, D.C.
- Tallest buildings in the Washington metropolitan area
- Television shows set in Washington, D.C.
- Television stations in Washington, D.C.
- Tenleytown
- Theaters in Washington, D.C.
- Thomas Jefferson Building
- Three Sisters
- Thurgood Marshall Federal Judiciary Building
- Tidal Basin
- Tornadoes in Washington, D.C.
- Transportation in Washington, D.C.
- Trinidad
- Trinity Washington University
- Truxton Circle
- Twenty-third Amendment to the United States Constitution
- Twining

== U ==
- U Street
- Umoja Party
- Union Station
- United States Court of Appeals for the District of Columbia Circuit
- United States District Court for the District of Columbia
- United States federal courthouses in the District of Columbia
- United States House Oversight and Government Reform Subcommittee on Federal Workforce, Post Office, and the District of Columbia
- United States Senate Committee on Corporations Organized in the District of Columbia
- United States Senate Committee on the District of Columbia
- United States Capitol
  - Complex
  - Visitor Center
- United States Naval Observatory
- United States Supreme Court Building
- University of the District of Columbia
- U.S. Highways in Washington, D.C.
- U.S. Labor Party of the District of Columbia
- U.S. Route 1 in the District of Columbia
- U.S. Route 1 Alternate (Washington, D.C.)
- U.S. Route 29 in the District of Columbia
- U.S. Route 50 in the District of Columbia
- US-DC

== V ==
- Vehicle registration plates of Washington, D.C.

== W ==
- Wakefield
- Washington Area Girls Soccer League
- Washington City Canal
- Washington Coalition for Comfort Women Issues
- Washington College of Law
- Washington County, D.C.
- Washington Diplomats
  - players
- Washington Haggadah
- Washington Highlands
- Washington Home for Incurables
- Washington Justice
  - players
- Washington Metropolitan Area Transit Authority
  - Washington Metro
- Washington National Cathedral
- Washington Navy Yard
- Washington Spirit
  - players
- Washington Symphonic Brass
- Wesley Heights
- Wesley Theological Seminary
- West End
- West Potomac Park
- White House
  - security breaches
- William Jefferson Clinton Federal Building
- Woodland
- Woodland Normanstone
- Woodley Park
- Woodridge

== See also ==
- Outline of Washington, D.C.
