= Tom Mulholland =

Tom Mulholland may refer to:

- Tom Mulholland (American football) (born 1968), coach
- Tom Mulholland (Gaelic footballer) (1936–2020), played for Louth, Leinster and Kilkerley Emmets
