= List of islands of Washington, D.C. =

This is a list of islands in Washington, D.C.

- Columbia Island
- East Potomac Park—the largest island in Washington, D.C.
- Goose Island
- Heritage Island
- Kingman Island
- Little Island
- Ripps Island—historical
- Theodore Roosevelt Island
- Three Sisters
- Tiber Island—historical

== See also ==
- List of islands on the Potomac River
