= Phillip Kennedy Johnson =

American comic book writer

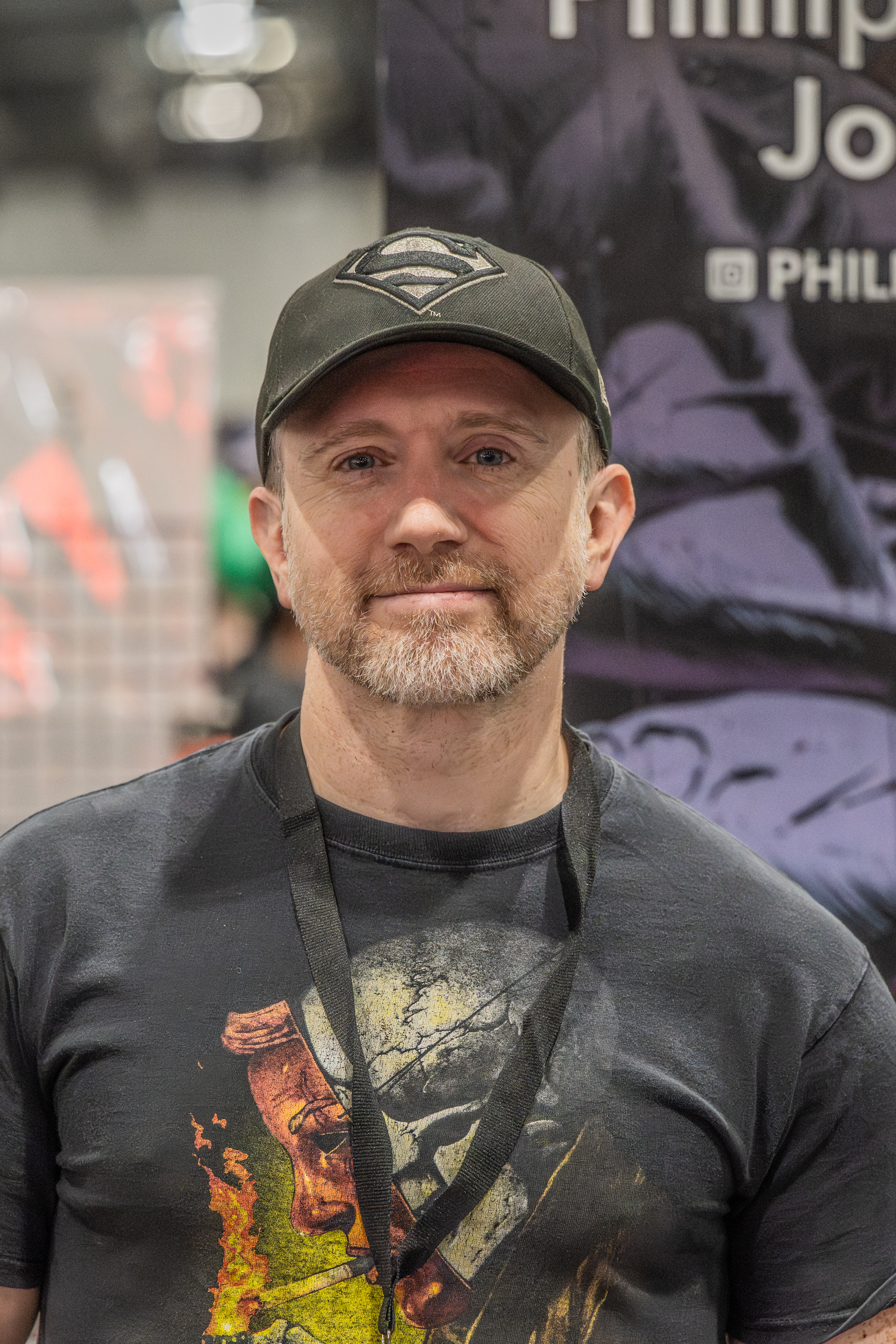
- At MCM Comic Con London, 24 October 2025
- Born: 1978 (age 47–48)
- Occupation: Comic book writer
- Writing career
- Notable works: Action Comics; The Incredible Hulk; Alien; 007

Phillip Kennedy Johnson is an American Eisner-nominated comic book writer, musician, and United States Army veteran, known for his work on Superman and Action Comics, Batman and Robin, The Incredible Hulk, Alien, and James Bond.

== Early life ==
Phillip Kennedy Johnson was born in Iowa. He and his younger brother, Bill Hensley, grew up in Pella, Iowa, a small Dutch immigrant rural town of about 10,000. Their childhood home was surrounded by farmland, not unlike the fictional Kansas community that served as the boyhood home for Superman, a character whose stories Johnson would gain recognition for writing. Their father taught English literature and their mother taught Spanish.

The brothers developed a love of comics at a young age. Johnson amassed a large collection of books published by Disney, Marvel Comics and DC Comics, but came to favor Batman and Superman in particular, and began to use his own storylines for the latter, relating, "I remember watching the 1978 film and seeing [Christopher Reeve] on screen, the way he embodied the inherent goodness of Superman. He had almost absolute power, but he wielded it with absolute humility and compassion.”

Johnson and his brother attended high school in Kentucky, during which Johnson aspired to become a comic book artist, often drawing his favorite characters, including Batman, Superman, and the X-Men. He also developed a love for music, and dreamed of touring the United States as a musician. In an interview for a February 2021 Army press release, Johnson said that about 10 years prior, while touring the country with his band, Bill decided to become a comic artist, and to aid him in this endeavor, Johnson wrote stories for Bill to draw, which not only lead to a career for Bill as a 25M graphic designer, but also to a writing career for Johnson, who commented, "At first, it was really just to help my brother get a foot in the door. We set out to educate ourselves about the comics industry together, and as it turns out, I found it really fun and rewarding."

Johnson studied music at Eastern Kentucky University, focusing on the trumpet. After graduating in 2004, he toured with the Glenn Miller Orchestra from 2004 to 2005. He left that job to get married. Johnson earned a master’s degree in music from the University of North Texas.

== Career ==
=== Military ===
In 2005, Johnson joined the U.S. Army, attaining the rank of sergeant first class. and serving as an active-duty soldier with the U.S. Army Field Band at Fort Meade, Maryland from 2005 to 2025. He also played with the Moscow Ballet, the Dallas Opera, and the Washington Symphonic Brass. A November 2025 Comics Beat article indicated that had recently retired from the Army after more than two decades with that service.

=== Comics ===
Johnson broke into the comics industry in 2015, writing the creator-owned, four-part miniseries, Last Sons of America through BOOM! Studios. The story is set amid the aftermath of a biological terrorist attack that damages Americans’ ability to conceive, forcing parents to resort buying, bartering, or kidnapping children from foreign nations. Johnson conceived of the idea in the course of his volunteer work with anti-human trafficking organizations in Baltimore. While developing that story, Johnson also produced the weekly horror webcomic The Lost Boys of the U-Boat Bremen.

His other work for BOOM! Studios included Crocodile Black, and Warlords of Appalachia, His work on Last Sons of America was noticed by an editor at DC Comics, who contacted Johnson about working for that publisher.

On December 16, 2020, DC Comics announced that Johnson would be the new writer on the monthly Superman series and Action Comics, a stint he began with a two-part crossover story, “The Golden Age”, which centers upon Superman, his wife Lois Lane, and their son, Jonathan Kent, the then-current incarnation of Superboy. That story would debut March 9, 2021.

Johnson's other work for DC includes runs on Green Lantern: War Journal and a number of Batman titles. Johnson was the co-creator of and writer on the DC Black Label title The Fellspyre Chronicles.

As of 2025, Johnson teaches Creative Writing at The Kubert School.

Johnson was one of many creators who contribute to Incredible Hulk #19, which Marvel published in November 2024 as the 800th issue of Hulk.

In November 2025, it was reported that Phillip had signed a multi-year contract with Marvel, which would begin in January 2026.

== Bibliography ==
=== Comics ===
==== Boom! Studios ====
- Warlords of Appalachia #1–4 (2016–2017)
- Crocodile Black #1–5 (2024)
- Adventure Time Comics #13 (2017)

==== DC Comics ====
- Action Comics #1029–1060, 2021 Annual, 2022 Annual & 2023 Annual (2021–2023)
- Adventures of Superman: The Book of El #1–12 (2025–2026)
- Aquaman Annual (vol. 8) #1 (2018)
- Batman and Robin (vol. 3) #14–30 (2024–2026)
- Batman: Secret Files #3 (story: Hunters, 2020)
- Batman / Superman: The Authority Special (2021)
- Dark Crisis: Worlds Without a Justice League – Green Lantern (2022)
- DC's Crimes of Passion (story: The Crimson Bomber, 2020)
- Dog Days of Summer (2019)
- Future State: Superman – House of El (2021)
- Future State: Superman: Worlds of War #1–2 (2021)
- Gotham City Villains Anniversary Giant (story: Demon's Game, 2021)
- Green Lantern (vol. 7) #1–3, 15 (backup stories, 2023–2024)
- Green Lantern: Civil Corps Special (written with Jeremy Adams, 2024)
- Green Lantern: War Journal #1–12 (2023)
- Justice League: Road to Dark Crisis (story: The Pariah, 2022)
- Knight Terrors: Action Comics #1–2 (story: The Stuff of Nightmares, 2023)
- The Last God #1–12 (2019–2021)
- The Last God: Tales From the Book of Ages (2020)
- Lazarus Planet: We Once Were Gods (story: Song of the Dead, 2023)
- Legend of the Swamp Thing: Halloween Spectacular (story: Ring of Stones, 2020)
- New Talent Showcase 2018 (story: Batman: Leap of Faith, 2019)
- New Year's Evil (vol .2) (story: Sinestro: Bright and Terrible, 2019)
- Superman (vol. 5) #29–32 (2021)
- Superman: Warworld Apocalypse (2022)
- Tales from the Dark Multiverse: Batman – Hush (2020)

==== Dynamite Entertainment ====
- 007: For King and Country #1–6 (2023)
- 007 #1–6 (2022–2023)

==== Marvel Comics ====
- The Amazing Spider-Man/Queen in Black: Comic Giveaway Day 2026 (story: Infernal Rage, 2026)
- Alien #1–12 (2021–2022)
- Alien (vol. 2) #1–6 (2022–2023)
- Bring on the Bad Guys: Abomination (2025)
- Carnage Forever #1 (story: Homecoming, 2022)
- Dungeons of Doom #1–3 (2026)
- Empyre: Captain America #1–3 (2020)
- Extreme Carnage: Alpha (2021)
- Extreme Carnage: Omega (2021)
- Giant Sized Hulk (vol. 3) #1 (2024)
- Hulk Annual (vol. 3) #1 (story: Epilogue, 2023)
- Hulk: Blood Hunt (2024)
- Hulk War: Infernal Rage (upcoming limited series, 2027)
- Incredible Hulk (vol. 7) #1–30 (2023–2025)
- Infernal Hulk #1–present (2025–present)
- Hellhunters #1–5 (2024–2025)
- Logan: Black, White & Blood #4 (story: End of Days, 2026)
- Marvel: Black, White & Blood and Guts #3 (2025)
- Marvel Zombies: Resurrection (vol. 1) #1
- Marvel Zombies: Resurrection (vol. 2) #1–4 (2020)
- Midnight Spider-Man #1-present (2026)
- The Muppets Take the Marvel Universe (one story, 2026)
- Venom (vol. 4) #35 (written with Donny Cates, 2021)
- Venomverse Reborn #2 (July 2024)
- War is Hell (vol 2.) #1 (story: War Devil, 2019)

=== Collected editions ===
==== Boom! Studios ====
- Crocodile Black (trade paperback, 128 pages, 2025, ISBN 979-8892150873
- Warlords of Appalachia (trade paperback, 112 pages, 2017, ISBN 978-1684150007)

==== DC Comics ====
- Batman and Robin: The Gotham Cycle (176 pages, 2026 ISBN 978-1799507598)
- Batman and Robin: Memento (160 pages, 2025 ISBN 978-1799501008)
- Green Lantern: War Journal – Volume 1 (160 pages, 2024, ISBN 978-1779527387)
- Green Lantern: War Journal – Volume 2 (160 pages, 2025, ISBN 978-1779528629)
- Superman: Action Comics: The Arena (240 pages, 2022, ISBN 978-1779517173)
- Superman: Action Comics: Revenge of the Demon (192 pages, 2025, ISBN 978-1799500285)
- Superman: Action Comics: Rise of Metallo (144 pages, 2024, ISBN 978-1779524737)
- Superman: Action Comics: To Hell and Back (152 pages, 2024, ISBN 978-1779528216)
- Superman: Action Comics: Warworld Revolution (226 pages, 2023, ISBN 978-1779519887)
- Superman: Action Comics: Warworld Rising (150 pages, 2022, ISBN 978-1779514271)
- Superman: The One Who Fell (125 pages, 2021, ISBN 978-1779512642)
- Superman: The Warworld Saga (728 pages, 2023, ISBN 978-1779523884)

==== Marvel Comics ====
- Alien, Volume 1: Bloodlines (120 pages, 2021, ISBN 978-1302926144)
- Alien, Volume 2: Revival (176 pages, 2022, ISBN 978-1302926151)
- Alien, Volume 3: Icarus (136 pages, 2023, ISBN 978-1302926168)
- Empyre: Captain America & the Avengers (112 pages, 2020, ISBN 978-1302925901)
- Incredible Hulk, Volume 1: Age of Monsters (152 pages, 2024, ISBN 978-1302954161)
- Incredible Hulk, Volume 2: War Devils (144 pages, 2024, ISBN 978-1302954178)
- Incredible Hulk, Volume 3: Soul Cages (128 pages, 2024, ISBN 978-1302954635)
- Incredible Hulk, Volume 4: City of Idols (52 pages, 2025, ISBN 978-1302960834)
- Incredible Hulk, Volume 5: Gods Drink Blood (152 pages, 2025, ISBN 978-1302960841)
- Incredible Hulk, Volume 6: Monster Road (120 pages, 2026, ISBN 978-1302961640)
- Marvel Zombies: Resurrection (152 pages, 2021, ISBN 978-1302924409)

== Awards and nominations ==
- 2018 Eisner Award for Best Short Story — "Forgotten Princess" by Phillip Kennedy Johnson & Antonio Sandoval, in Adventure Time Comics #13 (KaBOOM!) — Nomination
