= List of fossiliferous stratigraphic units in Washington =

List of fossiliferous stratigraphic units in Washington may refer to:

- List of fossiliferous stratigraphic units in Washington (state)
- List of fossiliferous stratigraphic units in Washington, D.C.
