= Index of Washington-related articles =

Index of Washington-related articles may refer to:

- Index of Washington (state)-related articles
- Index of Washington, D.C.–related articles
