= List of public art in Washington, D.C. =

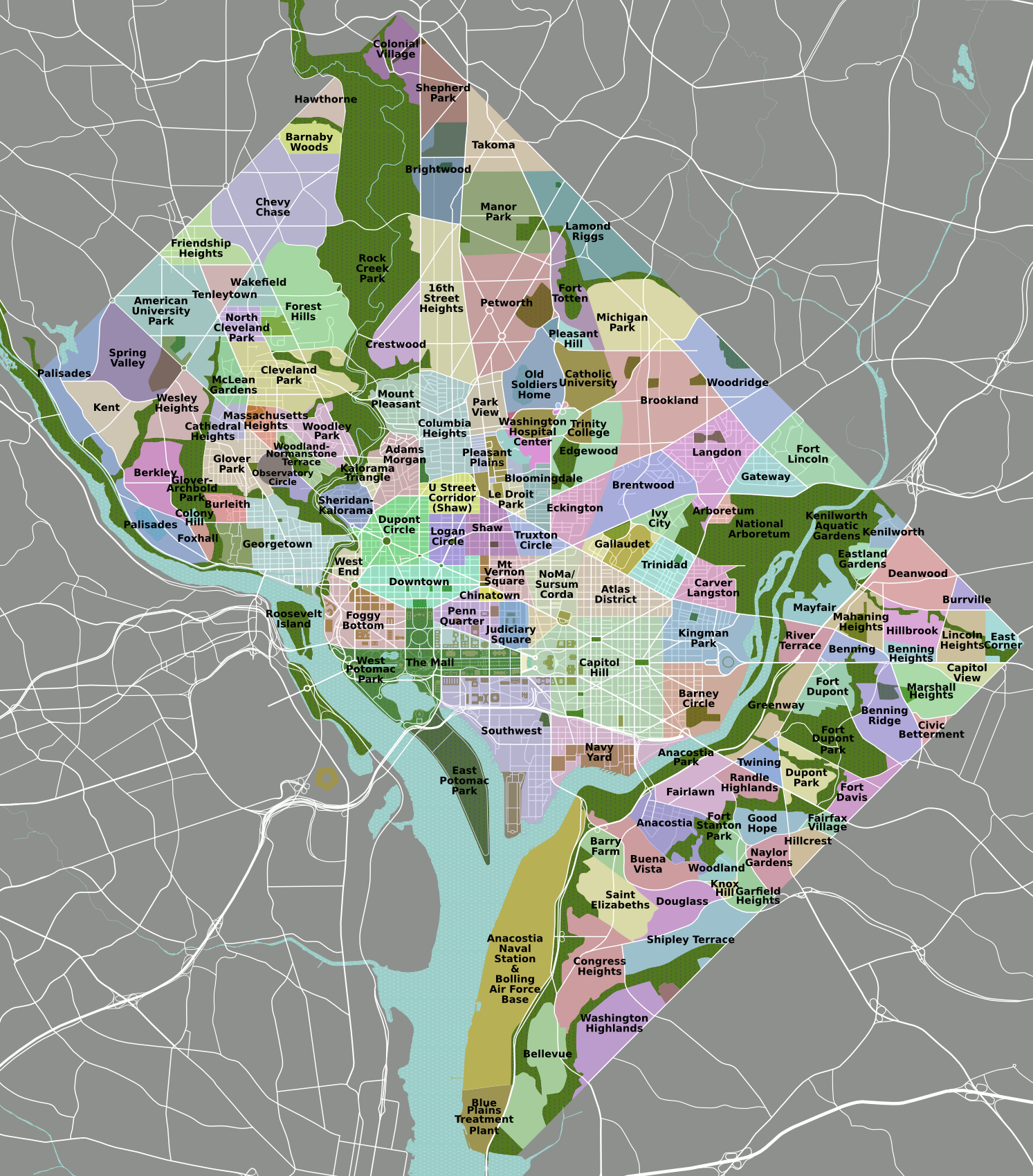

This is a list of public art in Washington, D.C. organized by neighborhood wards.

- Ward 1 – Neighborhoods such as Adams Morgan, Columbia Heights, Howard University and the U Street Corridor.
- Ward 2 – Neighborhoods such as Downtown, Dupont Circle, Foggy Bottom, Georgetown, parts of Shaw and cultural areas like the National Mall and the Smithsonian museums.
- Ward 3 – Neighborhoods such as Cleveland Park, American University and parts of Woodley Park and Chevy Chase.
- Ward 4 – Neighborhoods such as Brightwood, Fort Totten, Petworth, Takoma and parts of Chevy Chase.
- Ward 5 – Neighborhoods such as Brookland, Trinidad, Catholic University, the National Arboretum and parts of Fort Totten.
- Ward 6 – Neighborhoods such as Capitol Hill, Chinatown, Judiciary Square, Union Station, Penn Quarter and the Southwest area.
- Ward 7 – Neighborhoods such as Benning, Deanwood and Naylor Gardens.
- Ward 8 – Neighborhoods such as Anacostia and Congress Heights.

== See also ==
- Outdoor sculpture in Washington, D.C.
- Architecture of Washington, D.C.
