= List of college athletic programs in Washington =

List of college athletic programs in Washington may refer to:

- List of college athletic programs in Washington (state)
- List of college athletic programs in Washington, D.C.
