= List of burials at Oak Hill Cemetery =

This is a list of notable burials at Oak Hill Cemetery, Northwest, Washington, D.C.

== A ==
- Alice Acheson (1895–1996), painter
- Dean Acheson (1893–1971), Secretary of State under President Harry Truman
- Henry Addison (1798–1870), mayor of Georgetown
- Alvey A. Adee (1842–1924), assistant Secretary of State for 38 years
- John Adlum (1759–1836), pioneering viticulturalist, Revolutionary War soldier, judge
- Frederick Aiken (1832–1878), attorney for Lincoln assassination co-conspirator Mary Surratt
- Ethel Armes (1876–1945), journalist and author
- Conway Hillyer Arnold (1848–1917), rear admiral of the U.S. Navy

== B ==
- George M. Bache (1841–1896), Union Navy officer
- Gamaliel Bailey (1807–1859), physician, abolitionist journalist, editor, publisher
- Marcellus Bailey (1840–1921), patent attorney who worked with Alexander Graham Bell
- Margaret Lucy Shands Bailey (1812–1888), anti-slavery writer, newspaper editor/publisher, poet, lyricist
- Theodorus Bailey (1805–1877), rear admiral of the U.S. Navy
- Spencer Fullerton Baird (1823–1887), founder of the Marine Biological Laboratory at Woods Hole, Massachusetts, and second secretary of the Smithsonian Institution
- George Ellis Baker (1816–1887), member of New York State Assembly
- Stephen Bloomer Balch (1747–1833), Presbyterian minister and educator
- Amzi L. Barber (1843–1909), pioneer of the asphalt industry
- Joseph Barnes (1817–1883), physician and U.S. Surgeon General of the U.S. Army
- Bob Barr (1856–1930), baseball pitcher
- Henry W. Barry (1840–1875), Brevet Brigadier General in the Union Army and Representative from Mississippi
- George Beall (1729–1807), landowner in Maryland and Georgetown
- Charles Milton Bell (1848–1893), portrait photographer known for his work with Native Americans
- Alice Birney (1858–1907), co-founder of the National Parent-Teacher Association
- William Birney (1819–1907), Union Army general, professor, lawyer, author
- Walker Blaine (1855–1890), assistant Secretary of State, solicitor of the Department of State
- James H. Blake (1768–1819), physician and mayor of Washington, D.C.
- Benjamin C. Bradlee (1921–2014), executive editor for The Washington Post
- Glenn Brenner (1948–1992), Washington, D.C., sportscasting legend
- Alexander B. Britton (1867–1926), lawyer
- Frederick H. Brooke (1876–1960), architect
- Alfred Hulse Brooks (1871–1924), geologist and namesake for Brooks Range in Alaska
- Obadiah Bruen Brown (1779–1852), Baptist clergyman, chaplain of U.S. House of Representatives and Senate
- David K. E. Bruce (1898–1977), ambassador to France, Germany, and the United Kingdom
- Evangeline Bruce (1914–1995), society hostess and writer
- Charles Page Bryan, lawyer, politician, and diplomat
- Daniel Bryan, politician, abolitionist, lawyer, poet, and postmaster
- Thomas Barbour Bryan, businessman, lawyer, and politician
- Wiley T. Buchanan Jr. (1913–1986), Chief of Protocol of the United States and U.S. Ambassador to Luxeumbourg and Austria
- William P. Burch (died 1926), racehorse trainer

== C ==
- Wilkinson Call (1834–1910), Senator from Florida
- Horace Capron (1804–1885), founder of Laurel, Maryland, Union Army officer, United States Commissioner of Agriculture
- Frances Carpenter (1890–1972), photographer and writer
- Samuel S. Carroll (1832–1893), U.S.Army general
- Samuel P. Carter (1819–1891), naval officer in American Civil War, rear admiral in U.S. Navy
- Joseph Casey (1814–1879), Representative from Pennsylvania
- Sylvester Churchill (1783–1862), journalist and officer in the Regular Army
- Robert E. Clary (1805–1890), U.S. Army soldier in the Civil War
- Adolf Cluss (1825–1905), architect
- John H. C. Coffin (1815–1890), American astronomer and educator
- George Radcliffe Colton (1865–1916), governor of Puerto Rico
- Henry D. Cooke (1825–1881), first territorial governor of the District of Columbia
- Thomas Corcoran, mayor of Georgetown, District of Columbia
- William Wilson Corcoran (1798–1888), banker and philanthropist
- Henry K. Craig (1791–1869), U.S. Army officer in Mexican-American War and Civil War
- Richard R. Crawford (died 1888), lawyer and mayor of Georgetown
- Mary Mayo Crenshaw (1875–1951), civil servant and author
- Mary Cutts (1814–1856), socialite and historian
- Richard Cutts (1771–1845), Representative from Massachusetts, Comptroller of the Treasury

== D ==
- Jean Margaret Davenport (1829–1903), actress; her married name was Lander
- F. Elwood Davis (1915–2012), lawyer and philanthropist
- Alexander de Bodisco (1786–1853), Russian Minister to the United States
- Sophie Radford de Meissner (1854–1957), author, socialite and spiritualist
- Josiah Dent (1817–1899), third president of the Board of Commissioners of the District of Columbia
- John Watkinson Douglass (1827–1909), president of the Board of Commissioners of the District of Columbia and Commissioner of Internal Revenue
- Lorenzo Dow (1777–1834), frontier minister and writer
- William M. Dunn (1814–1887), Representative from Indiana, Judge Advocate General of the U.S. Army
- Betty Duvall (1845–1891), Confederate spy

== E ==
- Mary Henderson Eastman (1818–1887), historian and novelist who wrote about Native American life
- Seth Eastman (1808–1875), U.S. Army general, illustrator, painter
- John Eaton (1790–1856), Senator from Tennessee, Secretary of War
- Margaret "Peggy" Eaton (1799–1879), wife of John Eaton, confidant of Andrew Jackson and subject of Petticoat Affair
- Campbell Dallas Emory (1839–1878), U.S. military officer, served as aide de camp of Major General George Meade during the American Civil War
- Lydia S. English (1802–1866), founder of Georgetown Female Seminary
- George Eustis Jr. (1828–1872), Representative from Louisiana
- William Corcoran Eustis (1862–1921), U.S. Army captain, personal assistant to General John J. Pershing during World War I
- Tom Evers (1852–1925), baseball player

== F ==
- David E. Finley Jr. (1890–1977), director of National Gallery of Art, led the Roberts Commission
- Antonia Willard Ford (1838–1871), Confederate spy
- Samuel Ford (1832–1900), member of the Maryland House of Delegates
- Uriah Forrest (1746–1805), Continental Congressman and Representative from Maryland
- Judith Ellen Foster (1840–1910), American lecturer, temperance worker and lawyer
- Thomas J. D. Fuller (1808–1876), Representative from Maine
- Jacob Fussell (1819–1912), American manufacturer

== G ==
- John Garland (1793–1861), general in the Regular Army
- James Melville Gilliss (1811–1865), U.S. Navy officer, astronomer and founder of the United States Naval Observatory
- Charles C. Glover (1846–1936), banker and philanthropist
- Jane Cocking Glover (1789–1876), socialite and poet
- George Brown Goode (1851–1896), museum administrator at the Smithsonian Institution
- Sarah Ford Judd Goode (1854–1921), charter member of the Daughters of the American Revolution
- Arthur Pue Gorman (1839–1906), Senator from Maryland
- Arthur Pue Gorman Jr. (1873–1919), Maryland state senator
- Katharine Graham (1917–2001), president of The Washington Post
- Phil Graham (1915–1963), publisher and co-owner of The Washington Post
- Charles Griffin (1825–1867), Union general in the American Civil War

== H ==
- Alexander Burton Hagner (1826–1915), Associate Justice of the Supreme Court of the District of Columbia
- Peter V. Hagner (1815–1893), U.S. Army officer
- William Wister Haines (1908–1989), author, screenwriter and playwright
- George E. Harris (1827–1911), U.S. Representative from Mississippi
- John Harris (1793–1864), U.S. Marine Corps colonel and sixth Commandant of the Marine Corps
- James P. Heath (1777–1854), Representative from Maryland
- John J. Hemphill (1849–1912), Representative from South Carolina
- Joseph Henry (1797–1878), first secretary of the Smithsonian Institution
- David Higgins (1789–1873), Ohio politician and judge
- Herman Hollerith (1860–1929), statistician and inventor
- Samuel Hooper (1808–1875), Representative from Massachusetts
- James Herron Hopkins (1831–1904), Representative from Pennsylvania
- George Horton (1859–1942), U.S. Consul General at Smyrna, writer
- Henry L. Howison (1837–1914), rear admiral of the U.S. Navy
- Sandy Hume (1969–1998), journalist for The Hill
- William H. Hunt (1823–1884), Secretary of the Navy

== I ==
- Ebon C. Ingersoll (1831–1879), Representative from Illinois
- O.H. Irish (1830–1886), Chief, Bureau of Engraving and Printing, United States Department of the Treasury

== J ==
- Thomas S. Jesup (1788–1860), Quartermaster General of the U.S. Army from 1818 to 1860
- Alice Johnson (1860–1914), Broadway actress and singer
- Nancy Johnson (1794–1890), inventor of the first Ice cream maker
- Pierre Louis Jouy (1856–1894), ornithologist and naturalist
- George Joyce (died 1895), baseball player
- John A. Joyce (1842–1915), officer in the Union Army, poet and writer

== K ==
- Beverley Kennon (1793–1844), officer in U.S. Navy
- Philip Barton Key (1757–1815), Representative from Maryland
- Philip Barton Key II (1818–1859), U.S. Attorney for the District of Columbia and murder victim
- John Jay Knox Jr. (1828–1892), Comptroller of the Currency, author of Coinage Act of 1873
- Arthur Krock (1886–1974), Pulitzer Prize-winning journalist

== L ==
- Tolbert Lanston (1844–1913), American inventor
- William S. Lincoln (1813–1893), Representative from New York
- William Wallace Lincoln (1850–1862), son of Abraham and Mary Todd Lincoln, original burial site

== M ==
- Lily Mackall (1839–1861), Confederate spy
- William B. Magruder (1810–1869), physician and mayor of Washington City, District of Columbia
- Levi Maish (1837–1899), U.S. Representative from Pennsylvania
- Van H. Manning (1861–1932), director of U.S. Bureau of Mines
- William Marbury (1762–1835), one of the Midnight Judges appointed by President John Adams, plaintiff of Marbury v. Madison
- Elias Marks (1790–1886), founder of the South Carolina Female Collegiate Institute
- Alexander Macomb Mason (1841–1897), Confederate States Navy officer, explorer, diplomat
- Henry E. Maynadier (died 1868), U.S. Army officer known for the Raynolds Expedition and setting up peace talks with the Oglala and Brulé tribes
- Marshall McDonald (1835–1895), commissioner of the United States Commission of Fish and Fisheries
- Gale W. McGee (1915–1992), Senator from Wyoming, U.S. Ambassador to the Organization of American States
- Henrietta McKenney (1825–1887), painter
- John E. McMahon (1860–1920), U.S. Army officer in World War I
- William McMurtrie (1851–1913), chemist who launched sugar beet industry
- John R. McPherson (1833–1897), Senator from New Jersey
- Livingston T. Merchant (1903–1976), U.S. diplomat and ambassador
- Mary Virginia Merrick (1866–1955), Catholic social reformer
- Richard T. Merrick (1828–1885), lawyer
- William Matthews Merrick (1818–1889), judge and U.S. Representative from Maryland
- Myrtilla Miner (1815–1864), educator and abolitionist in Washington, D.C.
- Charles Eli Mix (1810–1878), commissioner of the Bureau of Indian Affairs
- Richard Mohun (1864–1915), explorer and diplomat
- George Washington Montgomery (1804–1841), writer, translator and diplomat
- John B. Montgomery (1794–1872), U.S. Navy officer during Mexican–American War and the American Civil War
- Charles Morris (1784–1856), Commodore, U.S. Navy, an officer from 1799 to 1847, during Quasi-War, First Barbary War, Second Barbary War and War of 1812
- Lawrence Quincy Mumford (1903–1982), librarian of the U.S. Congress
- Reuben D. Mussey Jr. (1833–1892), Union Army officer and lawyer

== N ==
- Francis G. Newlands (1846–1917), Representative and Senator from Nevada, white supremacist
- John George Nicolay (1832–1901), private secretary to President Abraham Lincoln

== O ==
- Herbert Gouverneur Ogden (1846–1906), geographer, topographer, cartographer
- Štefan Osuský (1889–1973), Slovak diplomat
- James F. Oyster (1851–1925), member of the D.C. Board of Commissioners

== P ==
- William Tyler Page (1868–1942), public servant at U.S. Capitol, author of American Creed
- Edwin P. Parker Jr. (1891–1983), U.S. Army officer in World War II
- Carlile Pollock Patterson (1816–1881), fourth superintendent of the United States Coast Survey
- Jennie Byrd Bryan Payne (1857–1919), philanthropist, artist, and society figure
- John Barton Payne (1855–1935), politician, lawyer, and judge and United States Secretary of the Interior
- John Howard Payne (1791–1852), composer of "Home! Sweet Home!"
- Henry Pellew (1828–1923), 6th Viscount Exmouth
- Paul J. Pelz (1841–1918), architect of the Library of Congress
- Charles H. Percy (1919–2011), U.S. senator from Illinois and president of Bell & Howell
- George Peter (1779–1861), Representative from Maryland
- George Peter (1829–1893), Maryland politician, son of George Peter (1779–1861)
- Seth Ledyard Phelps (1824–1885), U.S. Navy officer, Minister to Peru, president of the DC Board of Commissioners
- Charles Piez (1866–1933), engineer and general manager of the Emergency Fleet Corporation
- Albert Pike (1809–1891), American attorney, Confederate officer, writer, and Freemason
- William Pinkney (1810–1883), fifth bishop of the Episcopal Diocese of Maryland
- Benjamin F. Pleasants (1795–1879), acting Solicitor of the U.S. Treasury
- Charles Pomeroy (1825–1891), Representative from Iowa
- John Pool (1826–1884), Senator from North Carolina
- Charles Henry Poor (1808–1882), rear admiral of the U.S. Navy
- Levin M. Powell (1798–1885), rear admiral of the U.S. Navy known for developing riverine warfare techniques
- Robert E. Preston (1836–1911), director of the United States Mint

== R ==
- William Radford (1808–1890), Rear Admiral in the U.S. Navy
- George D. Ramsay (1802–1882), Chief of Ordnance of the U.S. Army
- Jesse L. Reno (1823–1862), U.S. Army officer from Virginia
- Jesse W. Reno (1861–1947), inventor of the escalator
- Zalmon Richards (1811–1899), Educator and first president of the National Education Association
- Benjamin F. Rice (1828–1905), U.S. senator from Arkansas
- William Adams Richardson (1821–1896), U.S. Secretary of the Treasury, chief justice of the U.S. Court of Claims
- John Rodgers (1812–1882), U.S. navy admiral
- William Ledyard Rodgers (1860–1944), U.S. Navy admiral, and naval and military historian
- George W. Roosevelt (1843–1907), Medal of Honor recipient in American Civil War
- Stephen Clegg Rowan (1808–1890), vice admiral of the U.S. Navy

== S ==
- Charles Anthony Schott (1826–1901), scientist
- Gustavus H. Scott (1812–1882), United States Navy rear admiral (exhumed in 1896 and reburied at Arlington National Cemetery in Arlington, Virginia)
- Thomas Sewall (1786–1845), American physician known for getting convicted for body snatching
- Willis Shapley (1917–2005), NASA executive
- William Shubrick (1790–1874), rear admiral of the U.S. Navy
- Lorenzo Sitgreaves (1810–1888), U.S. Army officer who led Sitgreaves Expedition
- Walter T. Skallerup Jr. (1921–1987), lawyer who worked for the U.S. Department of Defense and as General Counsel of the Navy
- Howard K. Smith (1914–2002), CBS and ABC newscaster; war correspondent; film star
- Joseph Smith (1790–1877), United States Navy rear admiral
- Joseph B. Smith (1826–1862), United States Navy officer killed in action in the American Civil War
- E. D. E. N. Southworth (1819–1899), novelist
- Samuel Spencer (1847–1906), railroad executive
- Samuel Spencer (1910–1997), president of the Board of Commissioners of the District of Columbia
- Samuel Sprigg (c. 1783 – 1855), governor of Maryland
- Fabius Stanly (1815–1882), rear admiral of the U.S. Navy
- Edwin M. Stanton (1814–1869), Attorney General under President James Buchanan, Secretary of War under President Abraham Lincoln
- Franklin Steele (died 1880), early settler of Minneapolis
- Hestor L. Stevens (1803–1864), Representative from Michigan
- Alexander Stewart (1829–1912), U.S. Representative from Wisconsin, re-interred at Oak Hill
- Cornelius Stribling (1796–1880), United States Navy rear admiral, United States Naval Academy Superintendent
- Noah Haynes Swayne (1804–1884), Associate Justice of the Supreme Court of the United States

== T ==
- Charles C. Tansill (1890–1964), professor of history and author
- Joseph Pannell Taylor (1796–1864), U.S. Army and Union Army general, brother of President Zachary Taylor
- Lorenzo Thomas (1804–1875), Adjutant General of the U.S. Army, acting Secretary of War under President Andrew Johnson
- Theodore Timby (1822–1909), inventor of the revolving turret first introduced on the Civil War ship USS Monitor, and many other inventions.
- Charles Henry Tompkins (1830–1915), brevet Brigadier General of the U.S. Army during the American Civil War. Recipient of the Medal of Honor.
- Clementina Tompkins (died 1931), painter
- Robin Toner (1954–2008), journalist and New York Times political correspondent
- Nathan Towson (1784–1854), U.S. Army general in War of 1812 and Mexican-American War
- Charles R. Train (1879–1967), rear admiral of the U.S. Navy
- James True (1880–1946) Washington DC journalist
- James Noble Tyner (1826–1904), Representative from Indiana, Postmaster General under President Ulysses S. Grant

== U ==
- Henry Ulke (1821–1910), portrait painter, photographer, entomologist; painted more than 100 portraits of high government officials
- Abel P. Upshur (1790–1844), Secretary of State and Secretary of the Navy under President John Tyler; originally buried at the Congressional Cemetery

== V ==
- Cornelius P. Van Ness (1782–1852), governor of Vermont and diplomat to Spain
- John Peter Van Ness (1769–1846), U.S. Representative from New York and mayor of Washington, D.C.
- Marcia Van Ness (1782–1832), American socialite

== W ==
- Robert J. Walker (1801–1869), Secretary of the Treasury, senator from Mississippi
- Richard Wallach (1816–1881), mayor of Washington, D.C.
- Howard Wall (1854–1909), professional baseball player
- Brainard Warner (1847-1916), Washington, D.C., businessman and developer
- George Corbin Washington (1789–1854), Representative from Maryland, grand-nephew of George Washington
- William Benning Webb (1825–1896), police superintendent and president of the Board of Commissioners of the District of Columbia
- Aristides Welch (1811–1890), race horse breeder
- Henry Litchfield West (1859–1940), journalist and member of the D.C. board of commissioners
- Edward Douglass White (1844–1921), Associate Justice of the Supreme Court of the United States and Chief Justice of the United States
- John Brewer Wight (1853–1923), president of the Board of Commissioners of the District of Columbia
- Cadmus M. Wilcox (1824–1890), U.S. Army officer who served in the Mexican–American War; Confederate general during the American Civil War
- John A. Wilcox (1819–1864), U.S. Representative from Mississippi, Confederate Congress member
- Charles Wilkes (1798–1877), naval officer and explorer, originally buried at Oak Hill
- Joseph Edward Willard (1865–1924), U.S. ambassador to Spain and Virginia politician
- William Orton Williams (1839–1863), Confederate officer during the American Civil War, executed as spy
- Gilbert C. Wiltse (1838–1893), naval officer in command at the 1893 Hawaiian Kingdom overthrow
- William W. W. Wood (1818–1882), engineer in the U.S. Navy
- Daniel Phineas Woodbury (1812–1864), U.S. soldier and energy; monument only
- Maxwell Van Zandt Woodhull (1843–1921), Union Army Officer during American Civil War
- Andrew Wylie (1814–1905), associate justice of the Supreme Court of the District of Columbia
- Robert H. Wyman (1822–1882), rear admiral in the U.S. Navy

== Y ==
- Ammi B. Young (1798–1874), architect known for his Greek Revival and Neo-Renaissance styles
- David Levy Yulee (1810–1886), Senator from Florida, first Jew to serve in the U.S. Senate
