= List of United States federal courthouses in Washington =

List of United States federal courthouses in Washington may refer to:

- List of United States federal courthouses in Washington (state)
- List of United States federal courthouses in Washington, D.C.
