= List of botanical gardens and arboretums in Washington =

List of botanical gardens and arboretums in Washington may refer to:

- List of botanical gardens and arboretums in Washington (state)
- List of botanical gardens and arboretums in Washington, D.C.
