= List of Catholic University Cardinals head football coaches =

This is a list of head football coaches for the Catholic University Cardinals football team, which represents the Catholic University of America in college football. Catholic joined the NCAA Division III's New England Women's and Men's Athletic Conference (NEWMAC) as a football-only member in 2017, having played the previous 18 seasons (1999–2016) in the Old Dominion Athletic Conference (ODAC).

== Coaching records ==
Legend

Varsity team Club team only No football team

Year(s)	Coach	W–L–T	Notes
1895–1909	Unknown	4–3–1	Team played one game in 1895 and 1897 and each season from 1905 to 1907. Four games were played in 1909. The 1897 game was against an unknown opponent and had an unknown result.
1910	James Johnson	2–4–0	
1911	McDade	3–2–2	
1912	Harry McDevitt	3–5–0	
1913	John Greer	1–4–1	
1914	John H. Madden	0–6–1	
1915–1916	Fred Nielsen	9–6–0	
1917–1918	No team due to World War I.		
1919	Tom Tracey	1–6–1	
1921	Harry Robb	3–5–0	
1922	Jim Dooley	2–6–0	
1923–1924	Tom Gormley	5–9–2	
1925–1929	John B. McAuliffe	21–16–0	
1930–1940	Dutch Bergman	59–31–4	Winningest coach; 1936 Orange Bowl and 1940 Sun Bowl.
1941–1946	No team due to World War II.		
1947	Gene Augusterfer	3–3–0	
1948	Tom Chisari	1–7–0	
1949–1950	Jan Jankowski	3–8–2	
1951–1964	No team.		
1965	Ron McManes	0–1–0	Football team re-established at the club level for one-game trial.
1966	Joe Glodeck	0–4–0	Competed at the club level.
1967–1968	Bill Daley	4–1–1	Competed at the club level.
1969–1970	Todd Gabbett	5–7–1	Competed at the club level.
1971	Dave Veshosky	0–3–0	Competed at the club level.
1972–1973	Joe Pascale	8–9–0	Competed at the club level.
1974	R. J. Skelley	4–5–0	Competed at the club level.
1975–1976	Joe Pascale	15–3–0	Compiled total record of 23–12–0 as head coach during non-consecutive tenure at the club level.
1977–1984	Joe Pascale	43–34	Team promoted to Division III starting in 1977.
1985–1986	Ro Waldron	4–17–1	
1987–1989	Fred O'Connor	17–13	
1990–1993	Rick Novak	15–25	
1994–2000	Tom Clark	56–14–1	
2001	Rob Ambrose	3–7	
2002–2003	Tom Mulholland	7–13	
2004–2005	Tom Clark	2–18	Served two non-consecutive tenures and compiled a total record of 58–32–1.
2006–2015	Dave Dunn	42–59	2008 ECAC Southeast Bowl champion
2016–present	Mike Gutelius	33–48	
