= Henry Addison (mayor) =

American mayor (1798–1870)

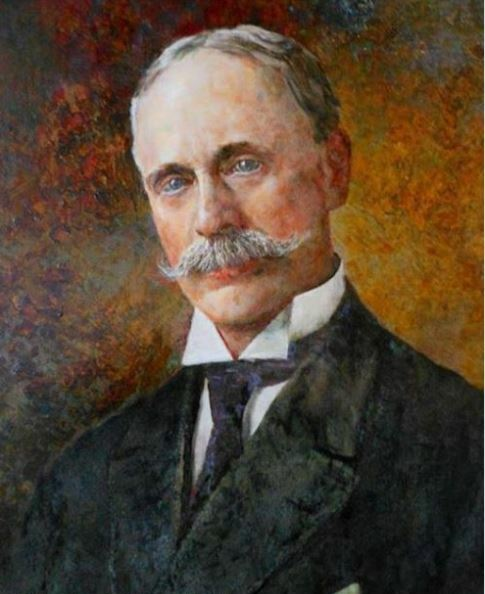
- Portrait of Addison by Harold L. Macdonald (1921)

Mayor of Georgetown
- In office March 4, 1861 – March 4, 1867
- Preceded by: Richard R. Crawford
- Succeeded by: Charles D. Welch
- In office March 9, 1859 – January 21, 1861
- Preceded by: Richard R. Crawford
- Succeeded by: Richard R. Crawford
- In office March 3, 1845 – March 2, 1857
- Preceded by: John Cox
- Succeeded by: Richard R. Crawford

Personal details
- Born: January 24, 1798 Maryland, U.S.
- Died: January 3, 1870 (aged 71) Washington, D.C., U.S.
- Resting place: Oak Hill Cemetery; Washington, D.C., U.S.
- Party: Democratic
- Children: 6
- Occupation: Politician; merchant

Henry Addison (January 24, 1798 – January 3, 1870) was mayor of Georgetown, District of Columbia, from 1845 to 1857, 1859 to January 1861 and from 1861 to 1867.

== Early life ==
Henry Addison was born on January 24, 1798. He was from Maryland and came to Georgetown, Washington, D.C. at a young age.

== Career ==
Addison was a hardware merchant. He owned a dry goods business on the corner of Bridge and High Streets in Washington, D.C.

Addison served as Mayor of Georgetown from March 3, 1845, to March 2, 1857, and from March 4, 1861, to March 4, 1867. However, he served an additional incomplete term. The results of the election on February 28, 1859, were debated. The judges of the election found Richard R. Crawford had won, but the council after counting the votes found Addison had won. Addison was sworn in on March 9, 1859, and served until January 21, 1861. Crawford won the case R. R. Crawford vs. Henry Addison and served out the remainder of the two year term, from January 21, 1861, to March 3, 1861.

In May and June 1853, legislation passed in Maryland and Georgetown to make a Metropolitan Railroad connecting the Baltimore and Ohio Railroad near Point of Rocks, Maryland, to Georgetown. In June 1856, Addison vetoed a second installment of payments for the railroad, which effectively cancelled the project. During his time as mayor, Addison called for a discussion on retrocession, but opinion was divided.

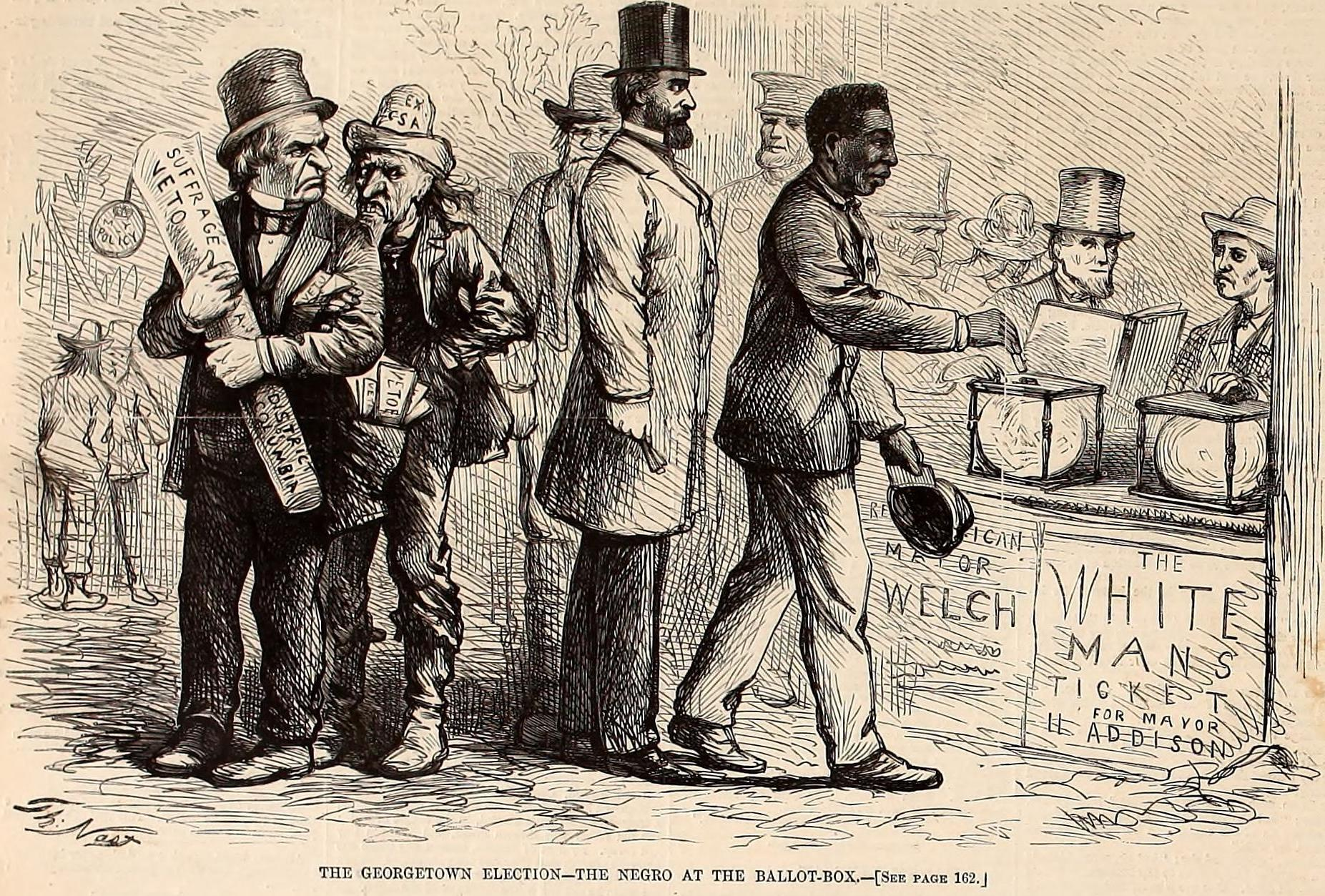
Harper's Weekly cartoon of ballot box for 1867 mayoral election

In 1867, Addison ran for mayor against Charles D. Welch, a Republican candidate. A Harper's Weekly cartoon by Thomas Nast depicted the Democratic ticket as the "White Man's ticket".

== Personal life ==
Addison married and had six children.

Addison died on January 3, 1870, at his home on the corner of Dunbarton and Montgomery Street. He was buried at Oak Hill Cemetery in Washington, D.C.

== Legacy ==
Hyde-Addison Elementary School in Washington, D.C., was named after Addison and Anthony T. Hyde. In 2020, the DC Facilities and Commemorative Expressions Working Group committee recommended that both Addison and Hyde should have their names removed from the building. A news article noted that Addison was an enslaver, according to U.S. Census records.
