= List of Georgetown Hoyas in the NBA and WNBA drafts =

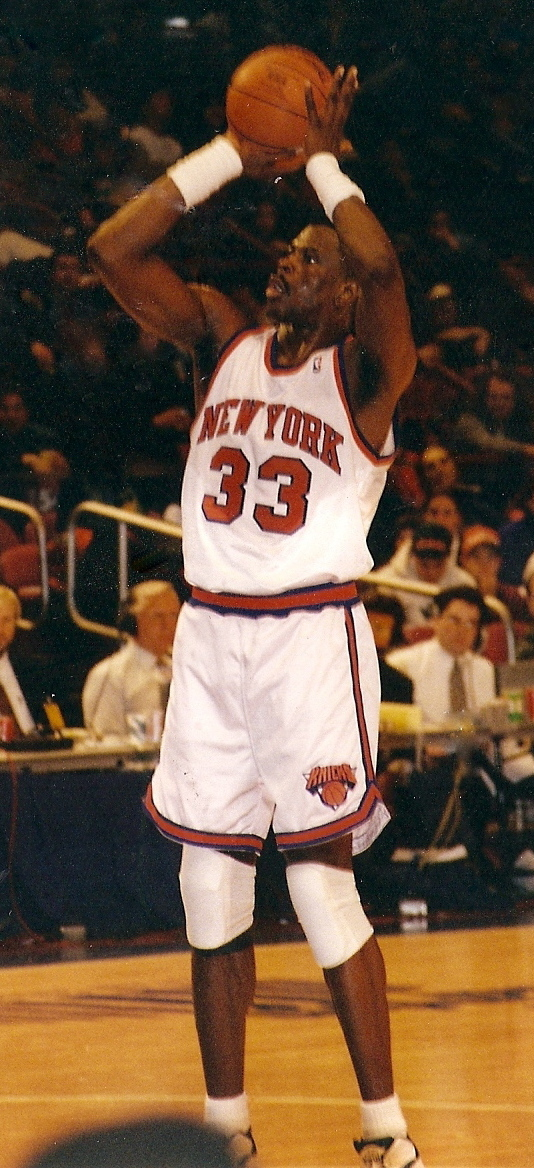
Patrick Ewing was the first Georgetown Hoyas player selected with the first overall pick in an NBA Draft.

The Georgetown Hoyas, representing Georgetown University, have had 44 players picked in the NBA draft and 3 players picked in the WNBA draft. Two Hoyas were the NBA first overall draft picks: Patrick Ewing in 1985 and Allen Iverson in 1996. Four former Hoyas players have been inducted into the Naismith Memorial Basketball Hall of Fame after being drafted: Ewing, Iverson, Alonzo Mourning, and Dikembe Mutombo. This total is tied for third-most among all NCAA men's and women's basketball programs.

As of 2026, the most recent Georgetown players to be drafted are Thomas Sorber and Micah Peavy, who were both selected in the 2025 NBA Draft.

== Players selected ==
=== Key ===
F	Forward	C	Center	G	Guard

Selected to NBA or WNBA All-Star Game
Won an NBA or WNBA championship
Inducted into Naismith Memorial Basketball Hall of Fame

=== NBA draft ===
Year	Round	Pick	Overall	Name	Pos.	Team
2026	No selections					
2025	1	15	15	Thomas Sorber	C	Oklahoma City Thunder
2025	2	10	40	Micah Peavy	F	Washington Wizards
2024	No selections					
2023	No selections					
2022	No selections					
2021	No selections					
2020	No selections					
2019	No selections					
2018	No selections					
2017	No selections					
2016	No selections					
2015	No selections					
2014	No selections					
2013	1	3	3	Otto Porter Jr.	F	Washington Wizards
2012	No selections					
2011	No selections					
2010	1	7	7	Greg Monroe	C	Detroit Pistons
2009	2	5	35	DaJuan Summers	F	Detroit Pistons
2008	1	17	17	Roy Hibbert	C	Indiana Pacers
2008	2	13	42	Patrick Ewing Jr.	F	Sacramento Kings
2007	1	5	5	Jeff Green	F	Boston Celtics
2006	No selections					
2005	No selections					
2004	No selections					
2003	1	9	9	Mike Sweetney	C	New York Knicks
2002	No selections					
2001	2	21	50	Ruben Boumtje-Boumtje	C	Portland Trail Blazers
2000	No selections					
1999	No selections					
1998	2	14	43	Jahidi White	C	Washington Wizards
1996	1	1	1	Allen Iverson	G	Philadelphia 76ers
1996	1	26	26	Jerome Williams	C	Detroit Pistons
1996	2	1	30	Othella Harrington	C	Houston Rockets
1995	2	29	58	Don Reid	F	Detroit Pistons
1994	No selections					
1993	No selections					
1992	1	2	2	Alonzo Mourning	C	Charlotte Hornets
1991	1	4	4	Dikembe Mutombo	C	Denver Nuggets
1990	No selections					
1989	No selections					
1988	No selections					
1987	1	4	4	Reggie Williams	F	Los Angeles Clippers
1986	2	20	44	David Wingate	G	Philadelphia 76ers
1986	2	23	47	Michael Jackson	G	New York Knicks
1986	4	6	76	Michael Graham	F	Seattle SuperSonics
1986	7	3	142	Ralph Dalton	C	Cleveland Cavaliers
1985	1	1	1	Patrick Ewing	C	New York Knicks
1985	2	2	26	Bill Martin	F	Indiana Pacers
1984	5	1	94	Gene Smith	G	Indiana Pacers
1984	9	11	195	Fred Brown	G	Atlanta Hawks
1983	No selections					
1982	1	13	13	Sleepy Floyd	G	New Jersey Nets
1982	4	10	79	Eric Smith	G	Portland Trail Blazers
1982	8	23	184	Ed Spriggs	C	Boston Celtics
1981	10	6	209	Mike Frazier	C	Atlanta Hawks
1980	1	19	19	John Duren	G	Utah Jazz
1980	2	5	28	Craig Shelton	G	Atlanta Hawks
1980	8	16	176	Al Dutch	F	Seattle SuperSonics
1979	10	18	202	Steve Martin	F	Washington Bullets
1978	4	11	77	Derrick Jackson	G	Golden State Warriors
1978	7	14	145	Ed Hopkins	C	Washington Bullets
1977	No selections					
1976	8	15	137	Merlin Wilson	C	Washington Bullets
1975	No selections					
1974	No selections					
1973	No selections					
1972	4	16	63	Art White	F	Milwaukee Bucks
1971	No selections					
1970	16	3	225	Paul Favorite	C	Cincinnati Royals
1969	11	8	149	Jim Supple	F	Cincinnati Royals
1968	No selections					
1967	2	2	14	Steve Sullivan	F	Detroit Pistons
1967	8	7	86	Frank Holloendoner	C	Cincinnati Royals
1966	No selections					
1965	No selections					
1964	10	1	78	Jim Christy	G	New York Knicks
1963	No selections					
1962	7	5	57	Bob Sharpenter	C	Syracuse Nationals
1961	No selections					
1960	No selections					
1958	No selections					
1957	No selections					
1956	No selections					
1955	No selections					
1954	No selections					
1953	5	—	—	Hugh Beins	C	Rochester Royals
1953	10	—	—	Gerry Nappy	C	Syracuse Nationals
1953	10	—	—	Dennis Murphy	F	Baltimore Bullets
1953	11	4	89	Bill Bolger	F	Rochester Royals
1952	No selections					
1951	No selections					
1950	4	—	41	Tommy O'Keefe	G	Washington Capitols
1950	9	—	102	John Brown	C	Chicago Stags
1949	5	—	—	Ray Corley	G	Providence Steamrollers
1948	5	—	—	Dan Kraus	G	Baltimore Bullets
1948	6	—	—	Andy Kostecka	F	Indianapolis Jets
1947	No selections					

=== WNBA draft ===
Year	Round	Pick	Overall	Name	Pos.	Team
2026	No selections					
2025	No selections					
2024	No selections					
2023	No selections					
2022	No selections					
2021	No selections					
2020	No selections					
2019	No selections					
2018	No selections					
2017	No selections					
2016	No selections					
2015	No selections					
2014	No selections					
2013	2	2	14	Sugar Rodgers	G	Minnesota Lynx
2012	No selections					
2011	No selections					
2010	No selections					
2009	No selections					
2008	No selections					
2007	No selections					
2006	No selections					
2005	No selections					
2004	1	10	10	Rebekkah Brunson	F	Sacramento Monarchs
2003	No selections					
2002	No selections					
2001	4	14	62	Katie Smrcka-Duffy	G	Sacramento Monarchs
2000	No selections					
1999	No selections					
1998	No selections					
1997	No selections					
