= List of Howard Bison in the NFL draft =

This is a list of Howard Bison football players in the NFL draft.

== Key ==
B	Back	K	Kicker	NT	Nose tackle
C	Center	LB	Linebacker	FB	Fullback
DB	Defensive back	P	Punter	HB	Halfback
DE	Defensive end	QB	Quarterback	WR	Wide receiver
DT	Defensive tackle	RB	Running back	G	Guard
E	End	T	Offensive tackle	TE	Tight end

== Selections ==
Year	Round	Pick	Overall	Player	Team	Position
1940	12	4	104	George Dougherty	Brooklyn Dodgers	B
1978	9	7	229	Herman Redden	San Francisco 49ers	DB
1988	8	24	217	Harvey Reed	Chicago Bears	RB
1989	12	9	316	Jimmie Johnson	Washington Redskins	TE
1989	12	13	320	John Javis	Denver Broncos	WR
1990	6	14	151	Sean Vanhorse	Miami Dolphins	DB
1993	6	16	156	Tim Watson	Green Bay Packers	DB
1994	7	4	198	Jay Walker	New England Patriots	QB
1995	7	24	232	Jose White	Minnesota Vikings	LB
2003	6	20	193	Marques Ogden	Jacksonville Jaguars	T
2005	2	18	50	Ronald Bartell	St. Louis Rams	DB
2006	6	38	207	Antoine Bethea	Indianapolis Colts	DB
