= Committee on the District of Columbia =

Committee on the District of Columbia may refer to:

- United States House Committee on Oversight and Government Reform, the successor committee to the United States House Committee on the District of Columbia
- United States Senate Committee on the District of Columbia
- Council of the District of Columbia, the legislature for the District of Columbia
