= Campus of St. Elizabeths Hospital =

Buildings in Washington, D.C.

This is a list of major buildings at St. Elizabeths Hospital in Southeast Washington, D.C.

== West Campus ==
Photo	Name	Number	Opened	Notes
	Center Building	1–4	1856	
	Garfield Hall	5	1872	connected to Center Building
	Pine Hall	6	1884	connected to Center Building
	Willow Hall	8	1895	connected to Center Building
	Howard Hall	9–10	1892	demolished in 1960
	Allison Hall	23–26	1899	
	Atkins Hall	31	1878	
	Hitchcock Hall	37	1910	
	Hagan Hall	38	1942	
	J Building	60	1902	
	L Building	64	1902	
	K Building	67	1902	
	Q Building	68	1902	
	E Building	69	1902	
	M Building	72	1902	
	C Building	73	1902	
	A Building	74	1904	
	B Building	75	1902	
	Douglas A. Munro Coast Guard Headquarters Building		2013	

== East Campus ==
Photo	Name	Number	Opened	Notes
	Dry Barn / Cow Barn	82	1884	
	Horse Barn / Stable	83	1902	
	Blackburn Laboratory	88	1931	
	R Building	89	1902	
	W. W. Eldridge Building	90	1931	part of Maple Quadrangle
	Glenside	91	1923	part of Maple Quadrangle
	Charles H. Nichols Building	92	1936	part of Maple Quadrangle
	William A. White Building	93	1934	part of Maple Quadrangle
	N Building	94	1902	
	I Building	95	1902	
	P Building	100	1902	
	Tuberculosis Building / Behavioral Studies Building	102	1933	
	CT Building 3 (Godding)	106	1938	part of Continued Treatment Complex
	CT Building 4 (Noyes)	107	1939	part of Continued Treatment Complex
	CT Building 5 (Godding)	108	1940	part of Continued Treatment Complex
	CT Kitchen & Cafeteria Building	109	1933	part of Continued Treatment Complex
	CT Building 6 (Godding)	110	1940	part of Continued Treatment Complex
	CT Building 1 (Richardson)	111	1933	part of Continued Treatment Complex
	CT Building 2 (Richardson)	112	1933	part of Continued Treatment Complex
	CT Building 8 (Noyes)	115	1943	part of Continued Treatment Complex
	CT Building 7 (Noyes)	116	1943	part of Continued Treatment Complex
	Barton Hall	117	1946	demolished
	Haydon Building	119	1952	demolished
	Dorothea Dix Pavilion	120	1959	demolished
	Chapel	121	1955	
	John Howard Pavilion	122	1960s	demolished
	Rehabilitation Medicine Building	124	1963	demolished
	New hospital building		2010	
	Gateway DC Pavilion		2013	
	CareFirst Arena		2018	
