= Tiber Island (Washington, D.C.) =

Former island in Washington, D.C., US

- Andrew Ellicott's revision of L'Enfant's Plan showing Washington City Canal and Tiber Island (SW quadrant of the District of Columbia)
- Interactive map of Tiber Island

Geography
- Location: Potomac River, Washington, D.C.
- Coordinates: 38°53′10″N 77°01′30″W
- Total islands: 1

Administration
- United States

Demographics
- Population: 0

Additional information
- No longer exists. Today it is the southwest Quadrant of Washington, DC

Tiber Island also known as The Island was a man-made island in Washington, D.C. formed when the Washington City Canal was dug to connect the stream beds of Tiber Creek and James Creek, creating an island out of an existing peninsula southwest of the Capitol. The canals have since been filled in, rejoining the island to the mainland. The Southwest Waterfront, Buzzard Point, National Mall, and L'Enfant Plaza areas were once on the island; at that time, their isolation from "the mainland" led to the area's colloquial nickname as "The Island."

The Tiber Island Cooperative Homes derive their name from the historic island.
