= Washington Area Girls Soccer League =

Youth soccer organization

The Washington Area Girls Soccer League (WAGS) is a youth soccer organization with 650 teams and about 10,000 total players throughout Washington D.C., Maryland and Northern Virginia. As of 2014, WAGS has spring and fall playing schedules for teams running from Under 9 age groups to Under 19, with three to 10 divisions in each, depending on the number of registered teams.

The genesis for girls select soccer in the metro DC area was on July 2, 1973, in Toronto Canada. The Annandale Virginiettes met the Bowie Maryland Weebles in the intermediate girls Robbie Tournament final. Bowie’s coach Joe Lucie and Annandale’s Larry Paul agreed to begin a process that eventually became the Washington Area Girls Soccer League.

Over that summer a number of people, notably Rael Vodicka, Everett Germain, Adele Dolansky, Wally Watson, and Mavis Derflinger began laying the groundwork for the organization. In the meantime, a number of Virginia and Maryland clubs continued organizing teams, while hosting and traveling to out-of-state tournaments.

In November 1973 the leadership met at the George Mason Regional Library in Annandale VA and formally voted in its original board with Rael Vodicka as president.

Working over the winter the board decided on two points for spring 1974. First there would be four age groups: girls born in 1957, 1960, 1961 and 1963. Second, they would affiliate with the newly arrived Virginia Youth Soccer Association as the overriding arbitrator.

Notable alumni of the Washington Area Girls Soccer League include Mia Hamm (former U.S. Women's National Team), Andi Sullivan (Stanford University, current U.S. Under 20 Women's National Team), Ali Krieger (Washington Spirit, current U.S. Women's National Team), Caroline Kelly (Virginia Tech University), Noelle Keselica (UVA, Women's Professional League) and Midge Purce (Harvard University, former U.S. Under 20 Women's National Team), Kim Crabbe (NCAA Champions George Mason University).
