= List of D.C. United records and statistics =

D.C. United is an American professional soccer club based in Washington, D.C.. The club was founded in 1995 as an inaugural Major League Soccer franchise, and began play in 1996. The club currently plays in MLS.

This list encompasses the major honors won by D.C. United, records set by the franchise, their head coaches and their players, and details the club's North American performances. The player records section includes details of the club's leading goalscorers and those who have made most appearances in first-team competitions. It also records notable achievements by United players on the international stage. Attendance records at Robert F. Kennedy Memorial Stadium, the club's home stadium since 1995, are also included in the list.

== Honors ==
D.C. United has won honors both domestically and in CONCACAF competitions. The team has won the MLS Cup and the MLS Supporters' Shield four times, the most championships and premierships, respectively, of any Major League Soccer franchise. Additionally, in domestic play, United has won two U.S. Open Cup titles. United is one of only two MLS sides to win a CONCACAF competition, winning the CONCACAF Champions' Cup in 1998. The last major title the club won was the Open Cup in 2013. In terms of league play, their last league premiership was in 2007, and their last league championship was in 2004.

=== Continental ===
- CONCACAF Champions' Cup
  - Winners (1): 1998
- CONCACAF Giants Cup
  - Runners-up (1): 2001

=== Domestic ===
- MLS Cup
  - Winners (4): 1996, 1997, 1999, 2004
  - Runners-up (1): 1998
- MLS Supporters' Shield
  - Winners (4): 1997, 1999, 2006, 2007
  - Runners-up (1): 1998

=== Cups ===
- U.S. Open Cup
  - Winners (3): 1996, 2008, 2013
  - Runners-up (2): 1997, 2009

== Player records ==
=== Appearances ===
Competitive, professional matches only, appearances as substitutes in brackets.

#	Name	Years	MLS	U.S. Open Cup	MLS Cup	CONCACAF	Total
1	(Bolivia) Jaime Moreno	1996–2002; 2004–2010	329 (41)	30 (7)	32 (1)	36 (3)	427
2	(United States) Ben Olsen	1998–2009	221 (21)	11 (4)	22	29 (2)	283
3	(United States) Steven Birnbaum	2014–2024	254 (13)	6	8	8 (1)	276
4	(United States) Bryan Namoff	2001–2010	195 (16)	22 (6)	12	31 (7)	260
5	(United States) Bill Hamid	2010–2017, 2018–	228	6	10	1	245
6	(Bolivia) Marco Etcheverry	1996–2003	191 (11)	11	23	16 (1)	241
7	(United States) Clyde Simms	2005–2012	182 (35)	16 (7)	5 (3)	26 (6)	229
8	(United States) Bobby Boswell	2005–2007; 2014–2017	188 (4)	8 (1)	10 (1)	16 (1)	222
9	(United States) Richie Williams	1996–2000, 2002	169 (5)	8 (1)	22	14	213
10	(United States) Nick DeLeon	2012–2018	180 (19)	8 (2)	10	4	202
11	(United States) Santino Quaranta	2001–2006; 2008–2012	159 (39)	16 (3)	6 (3)	20 (8)	201

=== Goalscorers ===
#	Name	Years	MLS Regular Season	U.S. Open Cup	Playoffs	CONCACAF	Total
1	(Bolivia) Jaime Moreno	1996–2002; 2004–2010	131	13	12	6	162
2	(Argentina) Christian Gómez	2004–2007; 2009	45	4	3	10	62
3	(El Salvador) Raúl Díaz Arce	1996–1997; 2000–2001	44	5	8	3	60
4	(Brazil) Luciano Emilio	2007–2009	41	4	0	11	56
5	(United States) Roy Lassiter	1998–1999; 2002	36	0	7	6	49
6	(Bolivia) Marco Etcheverry	1996–2002	34	1	3	2	40
7	(United States) Chris Pontius	2009–2015	31	3	0	3	37
8	(United States) Ben Olsen	1998–2009	29	0	2	4	35
t9	(Canada) Dwayne de Rosario	2011–2013	23	5	0	0	28
t9	(United States) Santino Quaranta	2001–2006; 2008–2012	24	4	0	0	28

MLS Cup Playoffs

1. Jaime Moreno (12)
2. Raúl Díaz Arce (8)
3. Roy Lassiter (7)
4. Tony Sanneh (6)
5. Alecko Eskandarian (4)
6. Marco Etcheverry (3)
7. Christian Gomez (3)
8. Ben Olsen (2)
9. Roy Wegerle (2)
10. Richie Williams (2)
11. Steve Rammel (2)

US Open Cup

1. Jaime Moreno (13)
2. Abdul Thompson Conten (5)
3. Raúl Díaz Arce (5)
4. Christian Gomez (4)
5. Eddie Pope (4)
6. Chris Albright (4)
7. Thabiso Khumalo (4)
8. Jamil Walker (3)
9. Branko Boskovic (3)
10. Luciano Emilio (3)
11. Fred (3)
12. Santino Quaranta (3)

CONCACAF Champions League
& Continental competitions

1. Luciano Emilio (9)
2. Christian Gomez (8)
3. Roy Lassiter (7)
4. Jaime Moreno (6)
5. AJ Wood (3)
6. Eddie Pope (2)
7. Fred (2)
8. Rod Dyachenko (2)
9. Francis Doe (2)
10. Marco Etcheverry (2)
11. Chris Pontius (2)

== Player award winners ==
=== MLS MVP ===
Most Valuable Player:

- (Bolivia) Marco Etcheverry (1998),
- (Argentina) Christian Gomez (2006),
- (Brazil) Luciano Emilio (2007),
- (Canada) Dwayne De Rosario (2011)

=== MLS Golden Boot ===
Golden Boot:

- (Brazil) Luciano Emilio (2007),
- (Canada) Dwayne De Rosario (2011),
- (Belgium) Christian Benteke (2024),

=== MLS Best XI ===
The MLS Best XI is an acknowledgment of the best eleven players in the league in a given season for Major League Soccer.

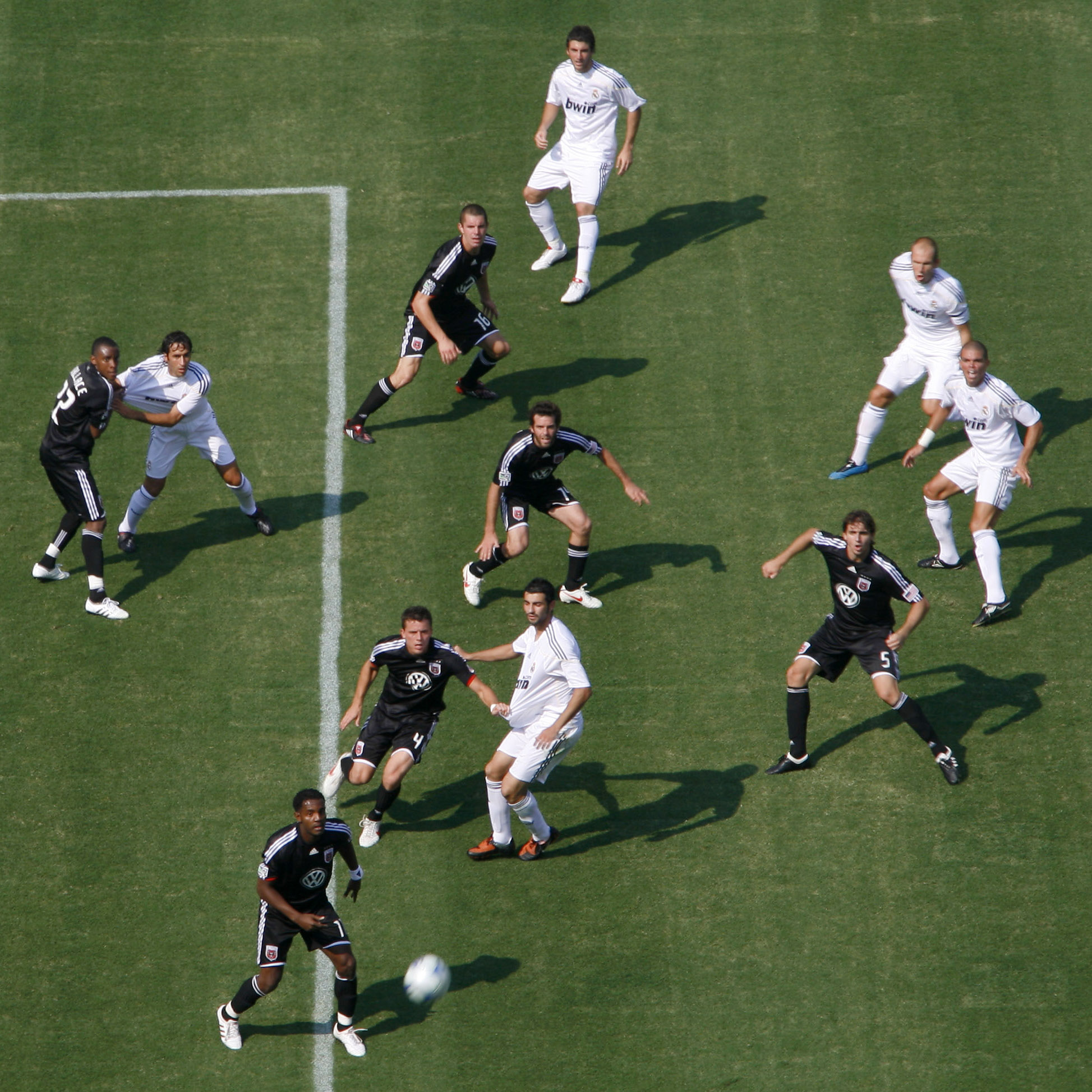
D.C. United players, including Ben Olsen and Luciano Emilio, look for a corner kick against Real Madrid

5 times:

- (Bolivia) Jaime Moreno: (1997), (1999), (2004), (2005), (2006)

4 times:

- (Bolivia) Marco Etcheverry: (1996), (1997), (1998), (1999)

3 times:

- (Argentina) Christian Gómez: (2005), (2006), (2007)

2 times:

- (United States) Jeff Agoos: (1997), (1999)
- (United States) Eddie Pope: (1997), (1998)
- (New Zealand) Ryan Nelsen: (2003), (2004)
- (United States) Bobby Boswell: (2006), (2014)

1 time:

- (United States) Troy Perkins: (2006)
- (United States) Ben Olsen: (2007)
- (Brazil) Luciano Emilio: (2007)
- (Canada) Dwayne De Rosario: (2011)
- (United States) Chris Pontius: (2012)
- (United States) Bill Hamid: (2014)
- (Argentina) Luciano Acosta: (2018)
- (England) Wayne Rooney: (2018)

=== Other awards ===
Defender of the Year:

- (United States) Eddie Pope (1997),
- (United States) Bobby Boswell (2006)

Coach of the Year:

- (United States) Bruce Arena (1997),
- (United States) Ben Olsen (2014)

Goalkeeper of the Year:

- (United States) Troy Perkins (2006),
- (United States) Bill Hamid (2014)

Newcomer of the Year:

- (Brazil) Luciano Emilio (2007)

Rookie of the Year:

- (United States) Ben Olsen (1998),
- (Honduras) Andy Najar (2010)

== Head coaching records ==
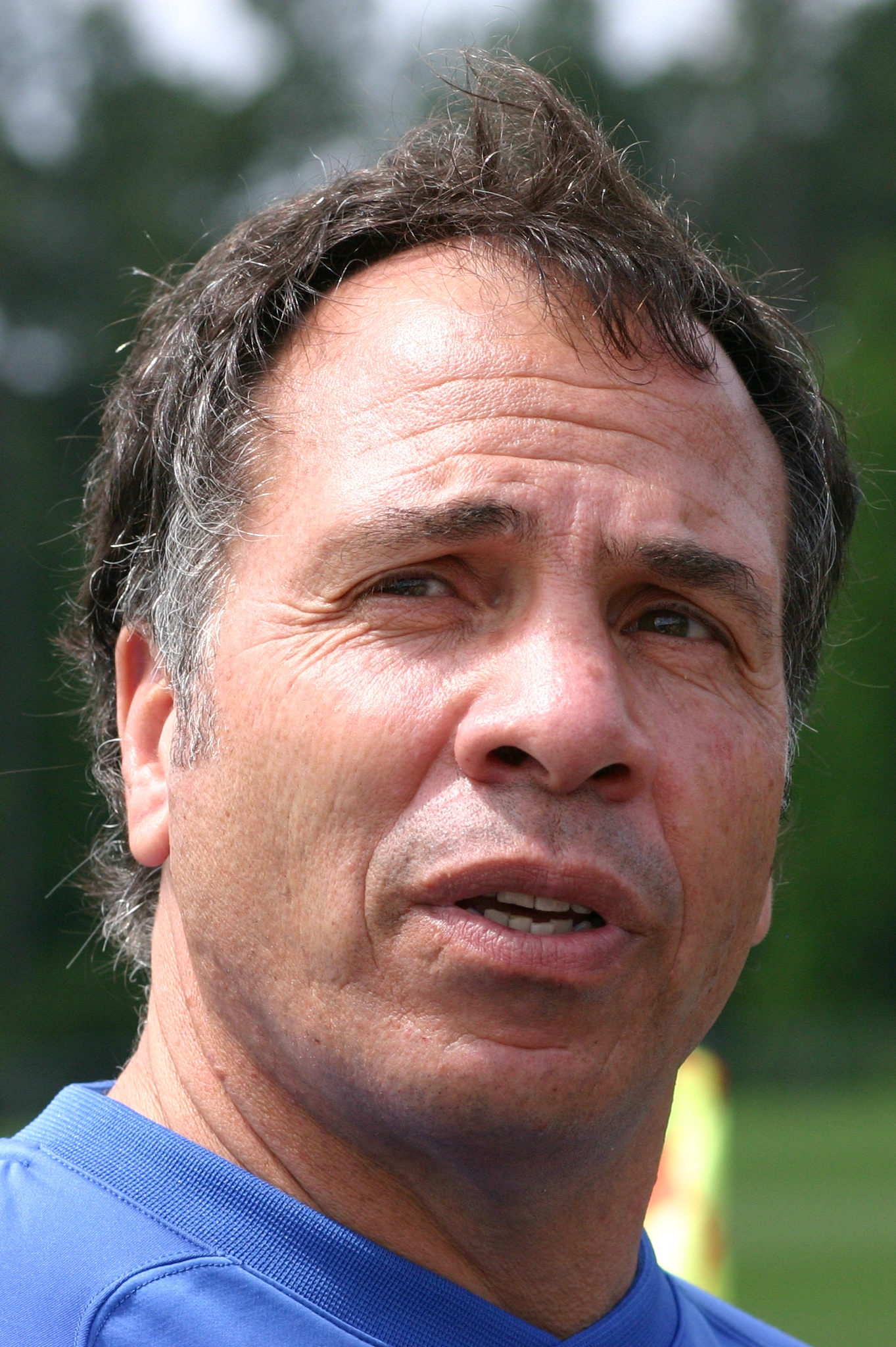
Bruce Arena, first head coach

- First head coach: Bruce Arena (coached the team for 131 games, from January 1996 to October 1998)

== Club match records ==
=== Firsts ===
- First match and first league match: San Jose Clash 1–0 D.C. United, the opening match of the 1996 Major League Soccer season, April 6, 1996.
- First U.S. Open Cup match: D.C. United 2–0 Carolina Dynamo, quarterfinals, September 4, 1996.
- First North American match: D.C. United 1–0 United Petrotrin, CONCACAF Champions' Cup, quarterfinals, August 12, 1997.
- First MLS Cup match: MetroStars 3–2 D.C. United, conference semifinals, September 24, 1996.

=== Record wins ===
- Record U.S. Open Cup win: 8–0 against New Jersey Stallions, Second round, June 27, 2001

=== Record defeats ===
- Record MLS regular season defeat:
  - 0-7 against Philadelphia Union, July 8, 2022
- Record MLS Cup defeat:
  - 0–4 against Chicago Fire, October 30, 2005
- Record U.S. Open Cup defeat:
  - 0–3 against Chicago Fire, September 3, 2006

== U.S. Open Cup ==
Below is D.C. United's record in U.S. Open Cup competitions. United has won three open cup titles (1996, 2008, and 2013), and has reached the final on five occasions. United's score is listed first.

Season	Round	Opponent	Result
1996	Quarterfinal	Carolina Dynamo	W 2–0
1996	Semifinal	Dallas Burn	W 2–0
1996	Final	Rochester Rhinos	W 3–0
1997	Third round	Hershey Wildcats	T 0–0 (a.e.t.) (W 3–2 pen.)
1997	Quarterfinal	Tampa Bay Mutiny	W 2–0
1997	Semifinal	San Francisco Seals	W 2–1
1997	Final	Dallas Burn	T 0–0 (a.e.t.) (L 3–5 pen.)
1999	Third round	Charleston Battery	L 3–4
2000	Second round	Charleston Battery	W 4–0
2000	Third round	Rochester Rhinos	W 3–0
2000	Quarterfinals	Miami Fusion	L 2–3
2001	Second round	New Jersey Stallions	W 8–0
2001	Third round	Hershey Wildcats	W 3–0
2001	Quarterfinals	Richmond Kickers	W 2–1
2001	Semifinals	New England Revolution	L 0–2
2003	Third round	Pittsburgh Riverhounds	W 2–1
2003	Fourth round	Virginia Beach Mariners	W 1–0 (a.e.t.)
2003	Quarterfinals	Wilmington Hammerheads	W 1–0
2003	Semifinals	MetroStars	L 2–3
2004	Fourth round	Richmond Kickers	L 1–2
2005	Fourth round	Richmond Kickers	W 3–1
2005	Quarterfinals	FC Dallas	T 1–1 (a.e.t.) (L 1–4 pen.)
2006	Fourth round	Columbus Crew	W 2–1 (a.e.t.)
2006	Quarterfinals	New York Red Bulls	W 3–1
2006	Semifinals	Chicago Fire	L 0–3
2007	Third round	Harrisburg City Islanders	L 0–1
2008	Third round	Rochester Rhinos	W 2–0
2008	Quarterfinals	Chicago Fire	W 2–1 (a.e.t.)
2008	Semifinals	New England Revolution	W 3–1
2008	Final	Charleston Battery	W 2–1
2009	Third round	Ocean City Barons	W 2–0
2009	Quarterfinals	Harrisburg City Islanders	W 2–1
2009	Semifinals	Rochester Rhinos	W 2–1
2009	Final	Seattle Sounders FC	L 1–2
2010	Third round	Richmond Kickers	W 2–0
2010	Quarterfinals	Harrisburg City Islanders	W 2–0
2010	Semifinals	Columbus Crew	L 1–2 (a.e.t.)
2012	Third round	Richmond Kickers	W 2–1 (a.e.t.)
2012	Quarterfinals	Philadelphia Union	L 1–2 (a.e.t.)
2013	Third round	Richmond Kickers	T 0–0 (a.e.t.) (W 4–2 pen.)
2013	Fourth round	Philadelphia Union	W 3–1
2013	Quarterfinals	New England Revolution	W 3–1
2013	Semifinals	Chicago Fire	W 2–0
2013	Final	Real Salt Lake	W 1–0
2014	Fourth round	Rochester Rhinos	L 0–1
2015	Fourth round	Pittsburgh Riverhounds	W 3–1 (a.e.t.)
2015	Fifth round	Philadelphia Union	L 1–2
2016	Fourth round	Fort Lauderdale Strikers	T 0–0 (a.e.t.) (L 3–4 pen.)
2017	Fourth round	Christos FC	W 4–1
2017	Round of 16	New England Revolution	L 1–2
2018	Fourth round	North Carolina FC	T 1–1 (a.e.t.) (W 4–3 pen.)
2018	Quarterfinals	Orlando City SC	T 1–1 (a.e.t.) (L 2–4 pen.)

== Continental statistics ==
=== Record by season ===
Below is D.C. United's record in North American and South American competitions. United is one of three U.S.-based clubs to compete in a South American competition.

Season	Competition	Round	Country	Club	Home result	Away result	Notes
1997	Champions' Cup	QF	(Trinidad and Tobago)	United Petrotrin	1–0	^{[A]}	
		SF	(United States)	LA Galaxy	0–1	^{[A]}	
		CM	(Mexico)	Guadalajara	2–2	^{[A]}	
1998	Champions' Cup	QF	(Trinidad and Tobago)	Joe Public	8–0	^{[A]}	
		SF	(Mexico)	León	2–0	^{[A]}	
		F	(Mexico)	Toluca	1–0	^{[A]}	
	Copa Interamericana	F	(Brazil)	Vasco da Gama	0–1	2–0	
1999	Champions' Cup	QF	(Honduras)	Olimpia	1–0	^{[A]}	
		SF	(Mexico)	Necaxa	1–3	^{[A]}	
		CM	(United States)	Chicago Fire	2–2	^{[A]}	
2000	Champions' Cup	QF	(Costa Rica)	Alajuelense	2–1	^{[A]}	
		SF	(United States)	LA Galaxy	1–1 (2–4 pen.)	^{[A]}	
		CM	(Mexico)	Pachuca	1–2	^{[A]}	
2001	Giants Cup	QF	(Jamaica)	Arnett Gardens	2–1	3–0	
		SF	(Guatemala)	Comunicaciones	2–1	^{[A]}	
		F	(Mexico)	América	0–2	^{[A]}	
2002	Champions' Cup	R16	(Guatemala)	Comunicaciones	2–1	0–4	
2005	Champions' Cup	QF	(Jamaica)	Harbour View	2–1	2–1	
		SF	(Mexico)	UNAM	1–1	0–5	
2005	Copa Sudamericana	R16	(Chile)	Universidad Católica	1–1	2–3	
2007	Champions' Cup	QF	(Honduras)	Olimpia	3–2	4–1	
		SF	(Mexico)	Guadalajara	1–1	1–2	
2007	SuperLiga	GS	(Mexico)	Monarcas Morelia	1–1	^{[A]}	
		GS	(Mexico)	América	1–0	^{[A]}	
		GS	(United States)	Houston Dynamo	0–1	^{[A]}	
		SF	(United States)	LA Galaxy	0–2	^{[A]}	
	Copa Sudamericana	R16	(Mexico)	Guadalajara	2–1	0–1	
2008	Champions' Cup	QF	(Jamaica)	Harbour View	1–1	5–0	
		SF	(Mexico)	Pachuca	2–1	0–2	
	SuperLiga	GS	(Mexico)	Guadalajara	1–2	^{[A]}	
		GS	(Mexico)	Atlante	2–3	^{[A]}	
		GS	(United States)	Houston Dynamo	1–3	^{[A]}	
2008–09	CONCACAF; Champions League	GS	(Mexico)	Cruz Azul	0–1	0–2	
2008–09	CONCACAF; Champions League	GS	(Honduras)	Marathón	2–4	0–2	
2008–09	CONCACAF; Champions League	GS	(Costa Rica)	Saprissa	0–2	2–2	
2009–10	CONCACAF; Champions League	PR	(El Salvador)	Luis Ángel Firpo	1–1	1–1 (5–4 pen.)	
2009–10	CONCACAF; Champions League	GS	(Honduras)	Marathón	3–0	1–3	
2009–10	CONCACAF; Champions League	GS	(Trinidad and Tobago)	San Juan Jabloteh	5–1	1–0	
2009–10	CONCACAF; Champions League	GS	(Mexico)	Toluca	1–3	1–1	
2014–15	CONCACAF; Champions League	GS	(Jamaica)	Waterhouse	1–0	2–1	
2014–15	CONCACAF; Champions League	GS	(Panama)	Tauro	2–0	1–0	
2014–15	CONCACAF; Champions League	QF	(Costa Rica)	Alajuelense	2–1	2–5	
2015–16	CONCACAF; Champions League	GS	(Jamaica)	Montego Bay United	3–0	3–3	
2015–16	CONCACAF; Champions League	GS	(Panama)	Árabe Unido	2–0	1–0	
2015–16	CONCACAF; Champions League	QF	(Mexico)	Querétaro	1–1	0–2	

Key

- PR = Preliminary Round
- GS = Group Stage
- R16 = Round of 16
- QF = Quarterfinals
- SF = Semifinals
- CM = Consolation Match
- F = Final

Notes

A: Played in a one-leg series

=== Record by competition ===
Matches that went into a penalty kick shootout are counted as draws in this table.

Competition	Played	Won	Drawn	Lost	Goals for	Goals against
CONCACAF Champions' Cup	26	13	6	7	46	35
CONCACAF Champions League	24	11	5	8	28	26
CONCACAF Giants Cup	4	3	0	1	7	4
Copa Interamericana	2	1	0	1	2	1
Copa Sudamericana	4	1	1	2	5	6
North American SuperLiga	7	1	1	5	6	12
Total	62	26	13	23	94	84

=== Record by club ===
Club	Pld	W	D	L	GF	GA	GD
(Trinidad and Tobago) United Petrotrin	1	1	0	0	1	0	+1
(United States) LA Galaxy	3	0	1	2	1	4	−3
(Mexico) Guadalajara	7	1	2	4	7	9	−2
(Trinidad and Tobago) Joe Public	1	1	0	0	8	0	+8
(Mexico) León	1	1	0	0	2	0	+2
(Mexico) Toluca	3	1	1	1	3	4	−1
(Brazil) Vasco da Gama	2	1	0	1	2	1	+1
(Honduras) Olimpia	3	3	0	0	8	3	+5
(Mexico) Necaxa	1	0	0	1	1	3	−2
(United States) Chicago Fire	1	0	1	0	2	2	0
(Costa Rica) Alajuelense	3	2	0	1	6	7	−1
(Mexico) Pachuca	3	1	0	2	3	5	−2
(Jamaica) Arnett Gardens	2	2	0	0	5	1	−4
(Guatemala) Comunicaciones	3	2	0	1	4	6	−2
(Mexico) Club América	2	1	0	1	1	3	−2
(Mexico) UNAM	2	0	1	1	1	6	−5
(Chile) Universidad Católica	2	0	1	1	3	4	−1
(Mexico) Monarcas Morelia	1	0	1	0	1	1	0
(United States) Houston Dynamo	2	0	0	2	1	4	−3
(Mexico) Atlante	1	0	0	1	2	3	−1
(Mexico) Cruz Azul	2	0	0	2	0	3	−3
(Honduras) Marathón	4	1	0	3	6	9	−3
(Jamaica) Harbour View	4	3	1	0	10	3	−7
(Costa Rica) Saprissa	2	0	1	1	2	4	−2
(El Salvador) Luis Ángel Firpo	2	0	2	0	2	2	0
(Trinidad and Tobago) San Juan Jabloteh	2	2	0	0	6	1	+5
(Jamaica) Waterhouse	2	2	0	0	3	1	+2
(Panama) Tauro	2	2	0	0	3	0	+3
(Jamaica) Montego Bay United	2	1	1	0	6	3	+3
(Panama) Árabe Unido	2	2	0	0	3	0	+3
(Mexico) Querétaro	2	0	1	1	1	3	+3

=== International Friendlies ===
May 23, 2001	D.C. United (United States)	3–4	(Germany) Bayer Leverkusen	Washington, D.C.
12:00 UTC−5				Stadium: RFK Stadium

November 17, 2001	D.C. United (United States)	2–2	(Honduras) Olimpia	Washington, D.C.
12:00 UTC−5				Stadium: RFK Stadium

June 23, 2002	D.C. United (United States)	0–0	(Argentina) Boca Juniors	Washington, D.C., United States
16:00 UTC−5				Stadium: RFK Memorial Stadium

October 17, 2002	Tottenham Hotspur (England)	0–1	(United States) D.C. United	London, England
00:00 UTC−5				Stadium: White Hart Lane

October 26, 2002	D.C. United (United States)	4–0	(El Salvador) Águila	Washington, D.C., United States
16:00 UTC−5				Stadium: RFK Memorial Stadium

May 14, 2003	D.C. United (United States)	1–0	(England) Tottenham Hotspur	Washington, D.C. United States
		Report		Stadium: RFK Stadium

July 23, 2003	D.C. United (United States)	0–0	(England) Blackburn Rovers	Washington, D.C. United States
		Report		Stadium: RFK Stadium

August 31, 2003	D.C. United (United States)	3–1	El Salvador	Washington, D.C. United States
		Report		Stadium: RFK Stadium

March 2, 2006	Getafe (Spain)	3–1	(United States) D.C. United	Getafe, Spain
12:00 UTC−5	Jajá 35'; Güiza 59'; Nano 78'	Report	Filomeno 10'	Stadium: Coliseum Alfonso Pérez

July 12, 2006	D.C. United (United States)	4–0	(Scotland) Celtic	Washington, D.C.
17:00 UTC−5	Adu 44'; Walker 57'; Boswell 66'; Metcalf 78'; Stokes (yellow card) 78'	Report	Miller (red card) 65'	Stadium: RFK Stadium; Attendance: 15,223; Referee: Alex Prus

August 9, 2006	Real Madrid (Spain)	1–1	(United States) D.C. United	Seattle
17:00 UTC−5	Cassano 22'	Report	Eskandarian 25'	Stadium: Qwest Field; Attendance: 66,830

February 5, 2009	D.C. United (United States)	1–4	(Denmark) Vejle Boldklub	Washington, D.C. USA
	N'Silu 49'	Report	17'; 33'; 44'; 80'	Stadium: Robert F. Kennedy Memorial Stadium

February 21, 2009	Puerto Rico Islanders	1–2	(United States) D.C. United	Bayamón, Puerto Rico
	Arrieta (penalty scored)	Report (in Spanish)	Gómez 58'; Simms 65'	Stadium: Juan Ramón Loubriel Stadium

March 10, 2010	Santos Laguna (Mexico)	2–3	(United States) D.C. United	Torreón, Mexico
7:30 pm	Torres 54'; Quintero 63'		23' Pontius; 35' Moreno; 70' Khumalo	Stadium: Estadio Corona; Attendance: 30,050

May 28, 2010	D.C. United (United States)	3–2	(Italy) Milan	Washington, D.C., USA
19:30	Emilio 20'; Pontius 30'; Allsopp 61'; Barklage (red card) 66'	Report	Oddo 67', 71'	Stadium: RFK Stadium; Attendance: 30,367

June 19, 2010	D.C. United (United States)	1–0	El Salvador	Washington, D.C., USA
19:30	Cristman 51'	Report		Stadium: RFK Stadium; Attendance: 10,240; Referee: Michael Donovan

July 24, 2010	D.C. United (United States)	4–0	(England) Portsmouth	Washington, D.C., USA
19:30	Allsopp 21', 31', 65'; Quaranta (red card) 54'; Hernández 56'; James (red card) 89'	Report	Mullins (red card) 54'	Stadium: RFK Stadium; Attendance: 8,891

May 22, 2011	D.C. United (United States)	1–2	(Netherlands) Ajax	Washington, D.C., USA
19:30 EDT	Brettschneider 58'	Report	10' Sulejmani; (yellow card) 69' Ebecilio; 87' Anita	Stadium: RFK Stadium; Attendance: 10,278; Referee: Mark Geiger

July 23, 2011	D.C. United (United States)	1–3	(England) Everton	Washington, D.C., USA
19:30 EDT	Pontius 47'	Report (D.C.); Report (Everton)	4' Anichebe; 16' Bilyaletdinov; (yellow card) 27' Cahill; 87' Gueye	Stadium: RFK Stadium; Attendance: 12,789

February 2, 2012	D.C. United (United States)	1–1	(Sweden) Malmö	Bradenton, Florida
10:30 UTC-5	Kitchen (yellow card) 32'; Richter 54'	Report	Friberg 14'	Stadium: IMG Academy

July 28, 2012	D.C. United (United States)	1–1	(France) PSG	Washington, D.C.
19:30 UTC-5	De Rosario 33' (pen.)	Report	Ibrahimović 3'	Stadium: RFK Stadium; Attendance: 13,176; Referee: John McCloskey
Note: Replaced Juventus on June 27, 2012.

February 1, 2013	D.C. United (United States)	1–1	(Sweden) Malmö FF	Bradenton, Florida
11:00 UTC-5	White (yellow card) 55'; Nane 78'	Report	Friberg 28'	Stadium: IMG Academy

July 12, 2013	D.C. United (United States)	1–1	(Mexico) C.D. Guadalajara	Washington, D.C.
20:00 EDT	Ruiz 73'	Report	Coronado 90'	Stadium: RFK Stadium

December 6, 2013	Persib Bandung (Indonesia)	2–1	(United States) D.C. United	Bandung
5:30 EST	Konaté 38'; Firman 70'		Seaton 20'	Stadium: Jalak Harupat Soreang Stadium

December 8, 2013	Arema (Indonesia)	2–1	(United States) D.C. United	Malang
6:00 EST				Stadium: Kanjuruhan Stadium

July 26, 2014	D.C. United (United States)	0–3	(England) Fulham	Jacksonville, Florida
18:00 EDT		Report	Dembélé 22', 44', 75'	Stadium: EverBank Field

February 3, 2015	D.C. United (United States)	0–0	(Sweden) Jönköpings Södra IF	Bradenton, Florida
1:00p.m. EST	Arnaud (yellow card) 39'; Metzger (yellow card) 58', (red card)	Report	(yellow card) 34'	Stadium: IMG Academy

February 6, 2015	D.C. United (United States)	0–1	(Sweden) Malmö FF	Bradenton, Florida
12:00p.m. EST	Driver (yellow card) 65'; Arrieta (yellow card) 88'		Berget 45'	Stadium: IMG Academy

January 29, 2016	Elfsborg (Sweden)	1–0	(United States) D.C. United	Bradenton
19:00 EDT	Claesson 4'	Report		Stadium: IMG Academy

February 2, 2016	J-Södra (Sweden)	2–2	(United States) D.C. United	Bradenton
15:00 EDT	Cibicki 48'; Siwe 58'		Espíndola 4' (pen.); Aguilar 61'	Stadium: IMG Academy

February 8, 2016	D.C. United (United States)	3–2	(Sweden) Jönköpings Södra IF	Bradenton
16:00 EST	Birnbaum (yellow card) 22'; Sarvas 28'; Franklin (yellow card) 37'; Acosta 43'; Le Toux 76'	Report	Aasmundsen 81', 90'	Stadium: IMG Academy

February 8, 2018	D.C. United (United States)	1–2	(Sweden) Malmö FF	Bradenton, Florida
	Mattocks 56'	Report	Strandberg 85', 87'	Stadium: IMG Academy

== Drafts ==
The following table shows D.C. United's first-round picks in the MLS SuperDraft:

Draft	Pick	Player	Position	From	Notes
2014	2	(United States) Steve Birnbaum	Defender	California; Orange County Blue Star	(Note: #2: Chivas USA → Philadelphia Union → D.C. United. January 16, 2014: D.C. United acquired the #2 overall selection in the 2014 SuperDraft and allocation money from Philadelphia Union in exchange for the #1 overall selection in the 2014 SuperDraft. On May 14, 2013, Philadelphia Union had acquired this first-round selection in the 2014 SuperDraft and allocation money from Chivas USA in exchange for midfielder Gabriel Farfan.)
2015	17	(Mexico) Miguel Aguilar	Forward	San Francisco; Portland Timbers U23s	
2016	11	(Germany) Julian Büscher (GA)	Midfielder	Syracuse; K-W United FC	(Note: #11: Sporting Kansas City → D.C. United. January 14, 2016: D.C. United acquired a first-round selection in the 2016 SuperDraft from Sporting Kansas City in exchange for targeted allocation money.)
