= Park Naylor =

Coordinates: 38.864°N 76.969°W

- Neighborhood of Washington, D.C.
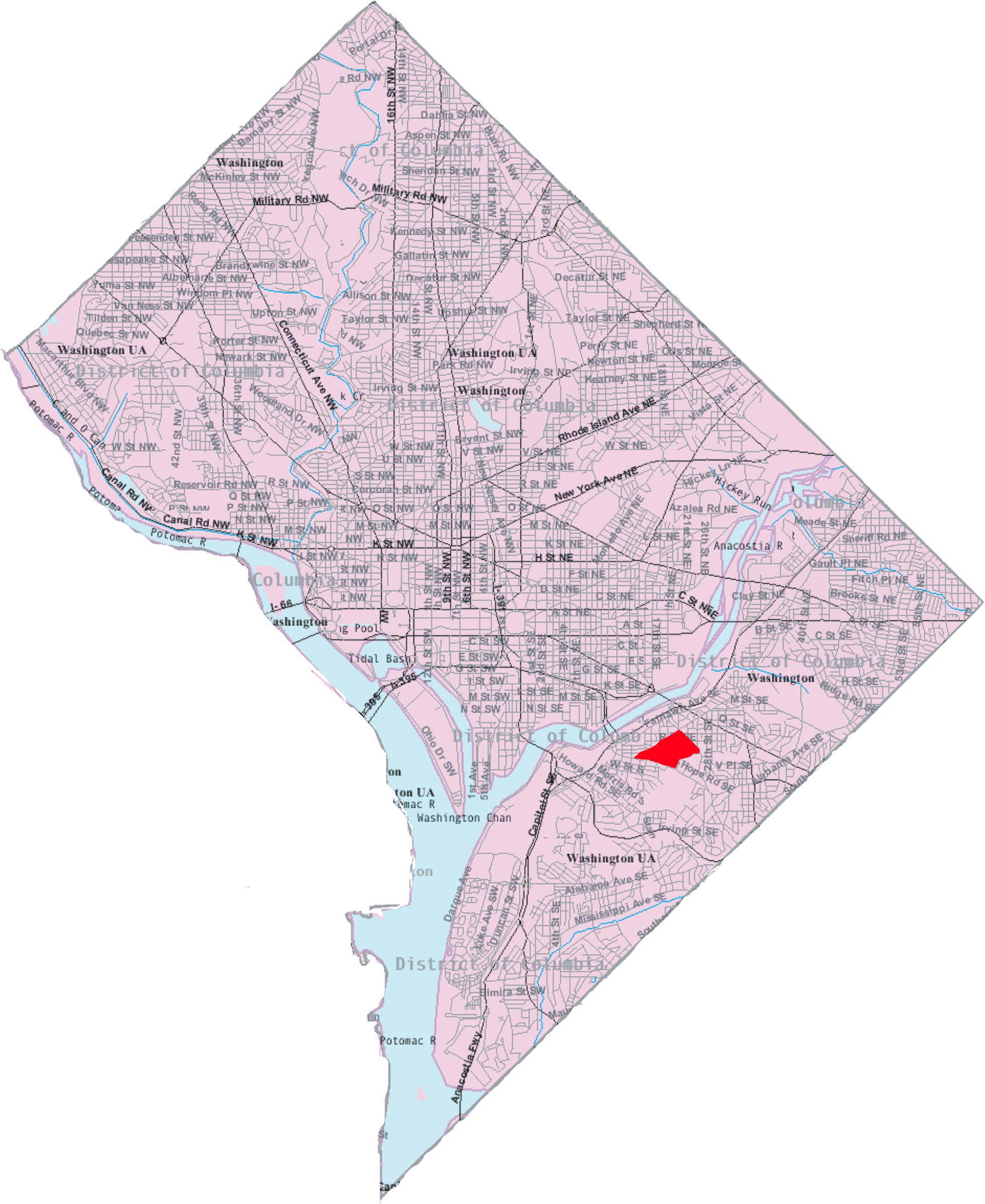
- Park Naylor within the District of Columbia
- Country: United States
- District: Washington, D.C.
- Ward: Ward 8

Government
  - Councilmember: Trayon White

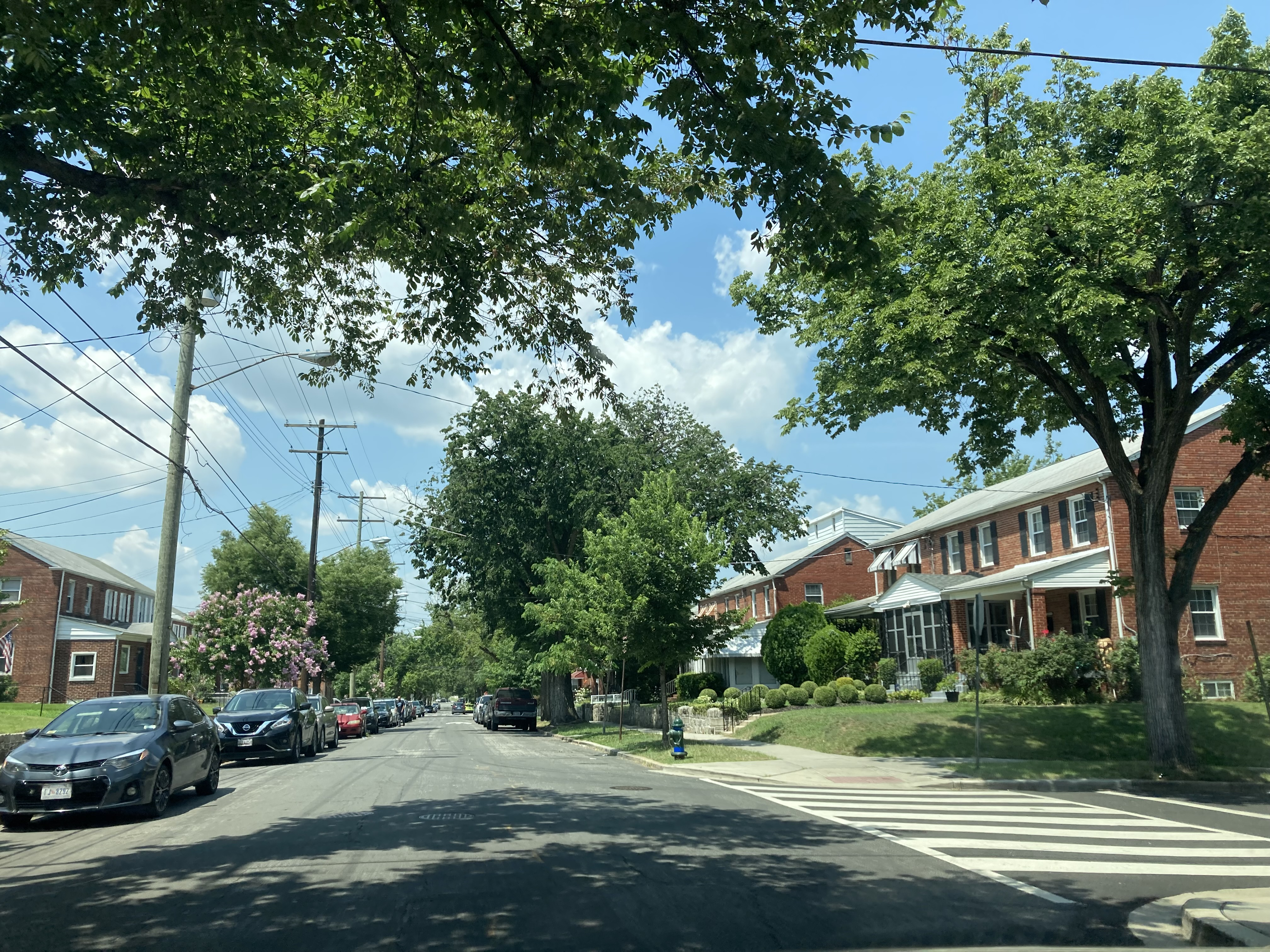
Intersection of 19th St. and S St. SE, in Park Naylor, July 2021.

Park Naylor is a residential neighborhood located in southeast Washington, D.C. It takes its name from its northern and eastern borders, Naylor Road and Fort Stanton Park. Park Naylor's other boundaries are Minnesota Avenue to the west, and Good Hope Road SE to the south. Also see article on Anacostia.

The Park Naylor community was built in 1963 over a 10.82 acres site with an on-site community centre.
