= Ripps Island =

Former island in Washington, D.C., United States

Coordinates: 38°53′26″N 77°2′17″W

Ripps Island was an island located in the Potomac River in the northwest quadrant of Washington, D.C., in the United States. It was located at the mouth of Tiber Creek, in the vicinity of today's Constitution Gardens.
