= List of Georgetown Hoyas in the NFL draft =

This is a list of Georgetown Hoyas football players in the NFL draft.

== Key ==
B	Back	K	Kicker	NT	Nose tackle
C	Center	LB	Linebacker	FB	Fullback
DB	Defensive back	P	Punter	HB	Halfback
DE	Defensive end	QB	Quarterback	WR	Wide receiver
DT	Defensive tackle	RB	Running back	G	Guard
E	End	T	Offensive tackle	TE	Tight end

== Selections ==
Year	Round	Pick	Player	Team	Position
1936	9	75	Joe Meglen	Pittsburgh Pirates	B
1940	19	178	Al Matuza	Green Bay Packers	C
1941	4	30	Augie Lio	Detroit Lions	G
1941	8	68	Al Matuza	Chicago Bears	C
1941	18	161	Joe McFadden	Philadelphia Eagles	B
1941	19	180	Earl Fullilove	Washington Redskins	T
1941	21	192	Jules Koshlap	Brooklyn Dodgers	B
1941	21	202	Jim Castiglia	Pittsburgh Steelers	B
1942	5	40	Al Blozis	New York Giants	T
1942	10	88	Mike Kopcik	New York Giants	E
1943	11	100	George Perpich	Washington Redskins	T
1943	13	112	Bill Erickson	Philadelphia Eagles	C
1943	17	160	Frank Dornfield	Washington Redskins	LB
1943	22	210	Johnny Barrett	Washington Redskins	B
1943	30	282	Stan Jaworowski	Philadelphia Eagles	T
1944	13	128	Bill Duffey	Chicago Bears	E
1945	16	157	Mike Costello	Boston Yanks	E
1945	19	190	Joe Drumm	Boston Yanks	T
1945	28	289	John Morelli	Boston Yanks	G
1945	30	311	Elmer Oberto	Boston Yanks	G
1950	30	385	Bob Noppinger	Washington Redskins	E
1950	30	387	Vick Banonis	Chicago Cardinals	C
1951	10	114	Bob Noppinger	Green Bay Packers	T
1951	11	133	Tom Hardiman	Chicago Bears	B
1953	11	126	Jim Slowey	Chicago Bears	C
