= List of Washington Justice players =

Washington Justice is an American esports team founded in 2018 that competes in the Overwatch League (OWL). The Justice began playing competitive Overwatch in the 2019 season.

All rostered players during the OWL season (including the playoffs) are included, even if they did not make an appearance.

== All-time roster ==
As of September 30, 2022

Handle	Name	Role	Country	Seasons	Ref.
Ado	Gihyeon Chon	Damage	South Korea	2019	
AimGod	Kwon Min-seok	Support	South Korea	2020	
ArK	Yeonjoon Hong	Support	South Korea	2019–2020	
Assassin	Sungwon Kim	Damage	South Korea	2021–present	
BeBe	Huichang Yoon	Support	South Korea	2021	
Closer	Wonsik Jung	Support	South Korea	2021	
Corey	Corey Nigra	Damage	United States	2019–2020	
Decay	Guiwoon Jang	Damage	South Korea	2020–present	
ELLIVOTE	Elliot Vaneryd	Tank	Sweden	2019–2020	
Fahzix	Riley Taylor	Support	United States	2019	
Fury	Junho Kim	Tank	South Korea	2021	
Gido	Gido Moon	Support	South Korea	2019	
Happy	Jeongwoo Lee	Damage	South Korea	2022	
Hyeonu	Hyeonwoo Cho	Support	South Korea	2019	
Janus	Junhwa Song	Tank	South Korea	2019	
Jerry	Taehee Min	Damage	South Korea	2021	
JJANU	Hyeonwoo Choi	Tank	South Korea	2020	
Kalios	Wooyul Shin	Tank	South Korea	2022–present	
Krillin	Yunghoon Jung	Support	South Korea	2022–present	
LullSiSH	Lukas Wiklund	Tank	Sweden	2019–2020	
Mag	Taeseong Kim	Tank	South Korea	2021–2022	
OPENER	Gibeom An	Support	South Korea	2022–present	
Ria	Sungwook Park	Tank	South Korea	2021	
rOar	Gye Chang-hoon	Tank	South Korea	2020	
Sansam	Hyangki Kim	Tank	South Korea	2019	
sleepy	Nikola Andrews	Support	United States	2019	
Stitch	Chunghui Lee	Damage	South Korea	2020	
Stratus	Ethan Yankel	Damage	United States	2019–2020	
TTuba	Lee Ho-Sung	Damage	South Korea	2020–2021	
Vigilante	Jun Kim	Support	South Korea	2022	
