= List of Georgetown Hoyas men's basketball head coaches =

The following is a list of Georgetown Hoyas men's basketball head coaches. The Hoyas have had 17 coaches in their 120-year, 118-season history. Ed Cooley is the current head coach.

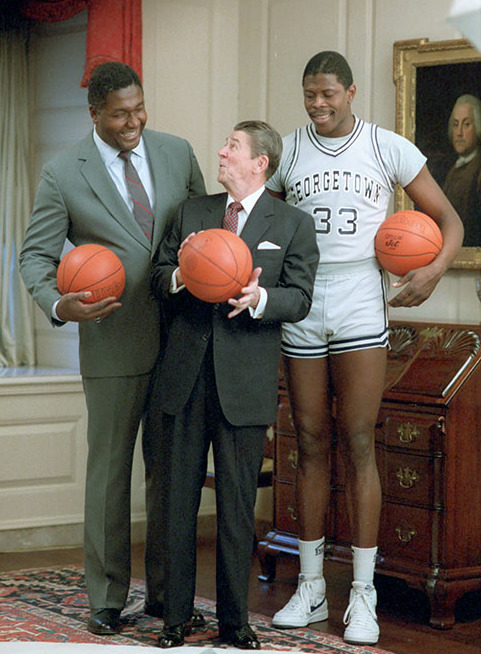
John Thompson Jr. with President Ronald Reagan and Patrick Ewing after Georgetown won the 1984 national title

Tenure	Coach	Years	Record	Pct.
1906-1907	No coach (Note: Student manager Lou Murray ran the team in 1906–1907.)	1	2-2	.500
1907-1911	Maurice Joyce	4	32-20	.615
1911-1914	James Colliflower (Note: During his two stints as head coach over four seasons (1911–1914 and 1921-1922), Colliflower's combined record was 43–21, .672.)	3	32-18	.640
1914-1921	John O'Reilly (Note: During his two stints as head coach over 11 seasons (1914–1921 and 1923-1927), O'Reilly's combined record was 87–47, .649.)	7	65-30	.684
1921-1922	James Colliflower	1	11-3	.786
1922-1923	Jackie Maloney	1	8-3	.727
1923-1927	John O'Reilly	4	22-17	.563
1927-1929	Elmer Ripley (Note: During his three stints as head coach over 10 seasons (1927–1929, 1938–1943, and 1946-1949), Ripley's combined record was 133–82, .619.)	2	24-6	.800
1929-1930	Bill Dudack	1	13-12	.520
1930-1931	John Colrick	1	5-16	.238
1931-1938	Fred Mesmer	7	53-76	.411
1938-1943	Elmer Ripley	5	68–39	.636
1943-1945	Program suspended for World War II			
1945-1946	Ken Engles	1	11-9	.550
1946-1949	Elmer Ripley	3	41–37	.526
1949-1952	Buddy O'Grady	3	35-36	.493
1952-1956	Buddy Jeannette	4	49-49	.500
1956-1960	Tom Nolan	4	40-49	.449
1960-1966	Tommy O'Keefe	6	82-60	.578
1966-1972	John Magee	6	69-79	.465
1972-1999	John Thompson Jr. (Note: John Thompson Jr. resigned in January 1999 and Esherick became head coach in mid-season.)	26 1/2	596-239	.715
1999-2004	Craig Esherick	5 1/2	103-74	.597
2004-2017	John Thompson III	13	278-151	.648
2017–2023	Patrick Ewing	6	75–109	.408
2023–present	Ed Cooley	3	43–57	.430
Totals	19 coaches	120 years; 118 seasons	1,755–1,182	.598
