= Richard R. Crawford =

American mayor (1810–1888)

Mayor of Georgetown
- In office March 2, 1857 – March 3, 1861
- Preceded by: Henry Addison
- Succeeded by: Henry Addison

Personal details
- Born: c. 1810 Pennsylvania, U.S.
- Died: July 29, 1888 (aged 78) Georgetown, D.C., U.S.
- Resting place: Oak Hill Cemetery; Washington, D.C., U.S.
- Party: Democratic
- Education: Princeton University (BA); Yale Law School (LLB)

Richard Ross Crawford (c. 1810 – July 29, 1888) was an American lawyer and politician who served as Mayor of Georgetown from 1857 to 1861 and plaintiff of the U.S. Supreme Court case Crawford v. Addison.

== Early life and education ==
Richard Ross Crawford was born around 1810 in Pennsylvania. He received a bachelor's degree from Princeton University in 1829, and later received his law degree from Yale Law School in 1834.

He was married to Elizabeth Davidson and they had one daughter, Laura.

== Career ==
Crawford practiced law in Georgetown and also became involved in local community affairs, including serving as an appointed member of the local board of health.

Crawford served two terms as Mayor of Georgetown from 1857 to 1861, unseating incumbent mayor Henry Addison. He again faced Addison as his opponent during his re-election campaign. The 1859 election between Crawford and Addison and the close vote count was a subject of controversy and led to a U.S. Supreme Court case, Crawford v. Addison. Ultimately, Crawford won the case and was permitted to serve out the remainder of the two-year term and recovered two years' salary. Crawford was defeated by Addison in his 1861 campaign re-election.

== Death ==
Crawford died on July 29, 1888, at the age of 78. He was buried in Oak Hill Cemetery.
