= The Plan (conspiracy theory) =

Black nationalist conspiracy theory

The Plan is a conspiracy theory in Washington, D.C., which posits that since the enactment of the District of Columbia Home Rule Act in 1973, white people have had a "plan to take back" the black-majority city and the offices of the local government. The theory asserts that the decline of low-income black residents and their replacement by wealthier whites from outside of Washington, D.C., is intentional through the calculated use of gentrification and urban renewal.

While most within Washington, D.C., regard the Plan as unfounded, the black population has fallen by about 25 percentage points, and the white population grown by about the same, in the period since the Home Rule Act was enacted. As of the 2020 census, black residents are no longer a majority in the district, but remain a plurality.

== History ==
Lillian Wiggins, a columnist for the Washington Afro American newspaper, was the first to formally describe the conspiracy theory, writing in 1979 that "Many residents believe that the Marion Barry era may be the last time Washington will have a black mayor. If negative programming and characterization of black leadership are allowed to continue in the city of Washington and especially the black community, there is a strong possibility of the 'master plan' which I have so often spoken about maturing in the 1980s." Some note that the Federal City Council, an organized group of civic and corporate leaders, mostly white, meets in secret and uses its power to influence the city's direction. The theory particularly gained sway in the 1980s and early 1990s, as the city became increasingly unaffordable to low-income minorities. Urban renewal was also seen as intended to push out minority populations.

Anti-theorists note that instead of an organized conspiracy, there are market forces, demographics, and gentrification—which is happening quickly in the District of Columbia—at work. Black residents have left the District, similar to how many white residents moved to the suburbs, beginning in the 1950s. However, though white flight has often been attributed to the desire to leave a decaying urban core, black flight has been related to displacement and unaffordable living costs. The existence of the theory reflects "the fears of a black community that already feels under attack in a city whose rising cost of living makes hanging on difficult...if such paranoia seems laughable, it reflects a reality that's easily illustrated in bright colors".

== 21st Century ==
Efforts to improve the District of Columbia Public Schools have been linked to the purported conspiracy, as the improvements have tended to increase enrollment of white children. Although shifting demographics are broadening school demand, these are seen as either the effectuation or the result of The Plan. Similarly, rising real estate values, increased business, more abundant night life and other factors which "would otherwise be viewed as a positive becomes evidence" of the scheme, even to those who benefit from the improvements.

The Plan, and related theories, are said to have contributed to the defeat of incumbent mayor Adrian Fenty in the 2010 primary election. One observer noted: "A vote for [challenger Vincent] Gray, admirers of the D.C. Council chairman imply, stops The Plan dead, putting all those whiny newcomers in their place." Sharon Pratt Kelly, who was mayor before Fenty, does not believe The Plan is real. She sees no malicious intent, but does allow for "a reckless disregard for a great many people" among the "power elite" in the city.

In Dax-Devlon Ross's 2021 book Letters to My White Male Friends, Ross addresses the myth without agreeing with or denying it. However, he expresses the need for white people to treat the theory seriously, describing the anger black people and people of color experience with the cycle of gentrification, as well as America's history of forced displacement policies. These policies enabled white people to seize lands, claims Ross, and were integral to the country's creation. This includes the government's seizure of lands and simultaneous expulsion of Native Americans across what is now the U.S., the overthrow of the Hawaiian Kingdom, Polynesian territories used for nuclear testing, and Greenwood, Oklahoma.

== See also ==
- Anti-White racism
- Institutional racism
- Demographics of Washington, D.C.
- History of Washington, D.C.
- Forced displacement
- List of African-American historic places in the District of Columbia
