= The Parks at Walter Reed =

Development in Washington D.C.

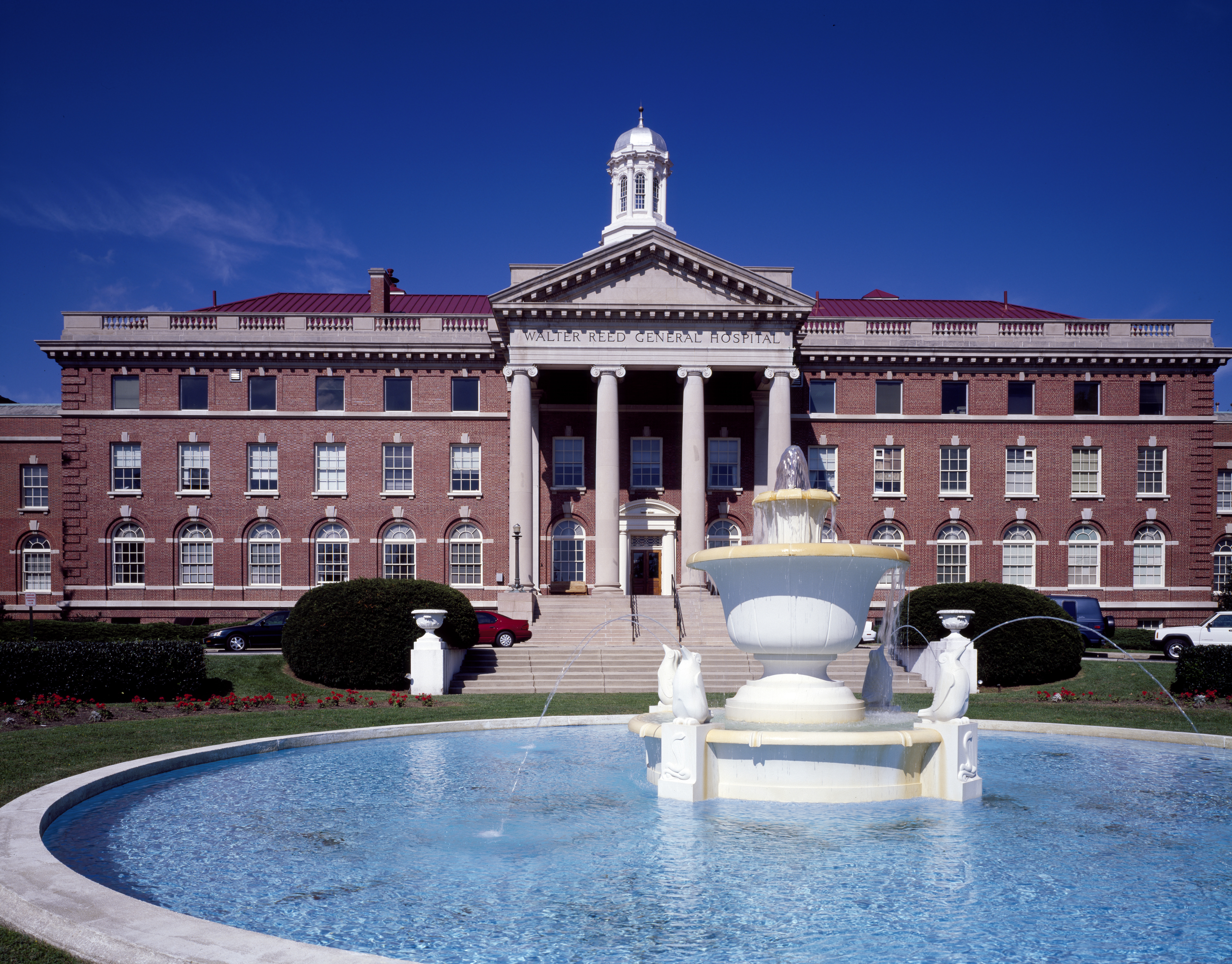
- The former main building of Walter Reed Army Medical Center prior to its 2011 closing

Location
- Location within the District of Columbia
- Coordinates: 38°58′30″N 77°01′48″W

The Parks at Walter Reed is a mixed-use development in the upper northwest of Washington, D.C., on the grounds of the former Walter Reed Army Hospital, which was merged with the National Naval Medical Center in Bethesda, Maryland, in 2011 to form the tri-service Walter Reed National Military Medical Center between 2005 and 2011. The project is a partnership of Hines, Urban Atlantic, and Triden Development Group, and will combine repurposed historic buildings with new construction to create 3.1 million square feet of commercial and residential space, along with 20 acres of open space.
