= List of public art in Washington, D.C., Ward 7 =

This is a list of public art in Ward 7 of Washington, D.C.

This list applies only to works of public art accessible in an outdoor public space. For example, this does not include artwork visible inside a museum.

Most of the works mentioned are sculptures. When this is not the case (i.e. sound installation, for example) it is stated next to the title.

Title	Artist	Year	Location/GPS Coordinates	Material	Dimensions	Owner	Image
Dancing in My Head	James Phillips & Rick Freeman	1994	African Heritage Center, 4108 Minnesota Ave., N.E.			D.C. Department of Parks & Recreation	
Positive Actions	Alfred J. Smith	1993	Fort Davis Community Center			D.C. Department of Parks & Recreation	
Starburst Intersection: Cornerstones Of History	Steven Weitzman	2007	Benning Road, Maryland Avenue, H Street, and Bladensburg Road, NE, Washington, DC (Starburst Intersection)	FŌTERA Full Color Poured Structural Concrete	6’ x 32’	Government of the District of Columbia	
Freedom to Read	Davide Prete	2019	Capitol View Library 5001 Central Ave. SE Washington DC 20019, United States	Painted Steel	10’x6’x4’	Government of the District of Columbia	
The Soundwave Sculpture Art Park	Davide Prete & Justin Wilson	2020	At the cross of Minnesota Ave SE, D St. SE and 34th St. SE (near Fort DuPont Park)				

|Painted Steel |10’x6’x4’ |Government of the District of Columbia |- |}
