= List of botanical gardens and arboretums in Washington, D.C. =

This list of botanical gardens and arboretums in Washington, D.C. is intended to include all significant botanical gardens and arboretums in the U.S. District of Columbia

Name	Image	Affiliation	City
American University Arboretum and Gardens		American University	Washington
Dumbarton Oaks		Harvard University	Washington
Franciscan Monastery gardens			Washington
Hillwood Museum & Gardens			Washington
Kenilworth Park and Aquatic Gardens		National Park Service	Washington
Smithsonian Gardens		Smithsonian Institution	Washington
Tudor Place			Washington
United States Botanic Garden		United States Capitol	Washington
United States National Arboretum		Agricultural Research Service	Washington

== See also ==
- List of botanical gardens and arboretums in the United States
