= Washington Symphonic Brass =

Brass ensemble in Washington, D.C.

The Washington Symphonic Brass is an American professional modern brass ensemble, and a not-for-profit 501- (c)(3) arts organization. The ensemble performs in the Washington, DC, Maryland, and Northern Virginia areas. The WSB presents live concerts, produces commercial recordings, and educates young brass and percussion musicians. The WSB is the Ensemble-in-Residence at George Mason University and is a collaborative artist with the National Philharmonic Orchestra, the Fairfax Choral Society, and the Amadeus Orchestra.

== History ==
The Washington Symphonic Brass was founded in 1993 by former National Symphony Orchestra trombonist Milton Stevens and trumpeter/arranger Phil Snedecor. It is incorporated in the state of Maryland.

The ensemble performs custom arrangements written by Phil Snedecor for large brass ensemble and percussion (four trumpets, four horns, four trombones, tuba, timpani, and percussion instruments), and plays both classical and modern symphonic music.

The WSB was presented with a Washington Area Music Award for recording excellence.

In 2012, the WSB's CD, The Edge, featured four of Phil Snedecor's arrangements of the music of Stravinsky, Shostakovich, Copland, and Berlioz.

In 2015, the WSB performed a composition by John Henderson at the Cathedral of St. Matthew the Apostle during a visit by Pope Francis.

== Discography ==
- Ancient Airs for Brass & Organ was recorded at Saint Luke Catholic Church in McLean, VA with William Neil, organist of National Presbyterian Church and the National Symphony Orchestra. "Ancient Airs" includes music of Respighi, Hildegard von Bingen, J.S. Bach, Praetorius and others.
- Nielsen on Brass was recorded at Washington National Cathedral with Douglas Major, organist. Included is the music of Carl Nielsen—his Symphony No. 3 "Sinfonia Espansiva", nine of the Short Preludes for Organ, Op. 51, and The Aladdin Suite, Op. 34
- Dances with Brass was recorded at The National Presbyterian Church in Washington, D.C. and includes symphonic dances arranged specifically for the Washington Symphonic Brass by Phil Snedecor.
- Burana in Brass, features music from Carl Orff's Carmina Burana. as well as the Finale to the Saint-Saëns famous "Organ Symphony" and solo performances from members of the WSB. Released on the Warner Classics label.
