= List of college athletic programs in Washington, D.C. =

This is a list of college athletic programs in the U.S. federal district of Washington, D.C.

== NCAA ==
=== Division I ===
Full NCAA Division I member colleges in Washington, D.C.
– FCS football, – non-football

Team	School	Conference	Sport sponsorship						
Team	School	Conference	Foot- ball	Basketball		Base- ball	Soft- ball	Soccer	
Team	School	Conference	Foot- ball	M	W	Base- ball	Soft- ball	M	W
American Eagles	American University	Patriot	No	Yes	Yes	No	No	Yes	Yes
George Washington Revolutionaries	George Washington University	Atlantic 10	No	Yes	Yes	Yes	Yes	Yes	Yes
Georgetown Hoyas	Georgetown University	Big East	FCS (Note: Georgetown's football team competes in the Patriot League.)	Yes	Yes	Yes	Yes	Yes	Yes
Howard Bison and Lady Bison	Howard University	MEAC	FCS	Yes	Yes	No	Yes	Yes (Note: Howard's men's and women's soccer teams compete in the Northeast Conference.)	Yes

=== Division II ===
Full NCAA Division II member colleges in Washington, D.C.
– Member location

Team	School	Conference	Sport sponsorship			
Team	School	Conference	Basketball		Soccer	
Team	School	Conference	M	W	M	W
UDC Firebirds	University of the District of Columbia	East Coast	Yes	Yes	Yes	No

=== Division III ===
Full NCAA Division III member colleges in Washington, D.C.
– Football member

Team	School	Conference	Sport sponsorship						
Team	School	Conference	Foot- ball	Basketball		Base- ball	Soft- ball	Soccer	
Team	School	Conference	Foot- ball	M	W	Base- ball	Soft- ball	M	W
Catholic Cardinals	Catholic University of America	Landmark	Yes	Yes	Yes	Yes	Yes	Yes	Yes
Gallaudet Bison	Gallaudet University	United East	Yes (Note: Gallaudet's football team competes in the Southern Collegiate Athletic Conference.)	Yes	Yes	No	Yes	Yes	No

== USCAA ==
Team	School
Trinity Washington Tigers	Trinity Washington University

== See also ==
- List of NCAA Division I institutions
- List of NCAA Division II institutions
- List of NCAA Division III institutions
- List of NAIA institutions
- List of USCAA institutions
- List of NCCAA institutions
