= List of fossiliferous stratigraphic units in Washington, D.C. =

This article contains a list of fossil-bearing stratigraphic units in Washington D.C., U.S.

== Sites ==
| Group or Formation | Period | Notes |
|---|---|---|
| Arundel Clay | Cretaceous | |

== See also ==
- Paleontology in Washington, D.C.
