= List of public art in Washington, D.C., Ward 8 =

This is a list of public art in Ward 8 of Washington, D.C.

This list applies only to works of public art accessible in an outdoor public space. For example, this does not include artwork visible inside a museum.

Most of the works mentioned are sculptures. When this is not the case (i.e. sound installation, for example) it is stated next to the title.

Title	Artist	Year	Location/GPS Coordinates	Material	Dimensions	Owner	Image
Saint Martin de Porres	Thomas McGlynn	1989	Our Lady of Perpetual Help Church	Wood & Concrete	Sculpture: approx. H. 12½ ft. Diam. 4 ft.; Base: approx. H. 3 ft. W. 3 ft.	Our Lady of Perpetual Help Church	
Chair	Bassett Furniture	1959	2101 Martin Luther King Avenue, S.E. 38°51′55.44″N 76°59′22.94″W	Aluminum	Approx. H. 19½ ft. W. 12 ft. (4,000 lbs.).	Curtis Investments	
Shooting for the Stars...Not Each Other	Cheryl Foster	2000	Southern Court Apartments, 885 Chesapeake St., S.E.			Southern Court Apartments	
Go With the Flow	Cheryl Foster	2000	Oxon Run Swimming Pool, 4th St., S.E. & Mississippi Ave., S.E.			Southern Court Apartments	
River Spirits of the Anacostia	Martha Jackson-Jarvis	2004	Anacostia Metro Station			Washington Metro	
Untitled	Anne Allardyce-Tully	2008	Congress Heights Metro Station			Washington Metro	
Thomas Edison	Evelyn Beatrice Longman	c. 1952	4555 Overlook Ave SW	Bronze			
