= Tom Mulholland (American football) =

American football coach (1967–2022)

Tom Mullholland
Biographical details
- Born: December 31, 1967; Bethesda, Maryland, U.S.
- Died: August 24, 2022 (aged 54); Johns Hopkins Hospital

Playing career
- 1990s: Catholic

Coaching career (HC unless noted)
- 1992: Towson (assistant)
- 1993–2001: Catholic University (DC)
- 2002–2003: Catholic University
- 2006–?: Walter Johnson HS (MD)

Head coaching record
- Overall: 7–13 (college)

Tom Mulholland (December 31, 1967 – August 24, 2022) was an American football coach. He served as the head coach for the Catholic Cardinals football team at The Catholic University of America in 2002 and 2003, compiled a record of 7–13.

== Early life ==
Mulholland was born and grew up in Bethesda, Maryland. He attended Gonzaga College High School, from which he graduated in 1986. He then attended The Catholic University of America and graduated in 1992 with a bachelor of arts degree in sociology.

== Coaching career ==
Mulholland served for one season as an assistant coach at Towson University in Towson, Maryland. The following year, he returned to his alma mater. He served for ten years as a defensive positional coach and defensive coordinator at Catholic.

In August 2002, Catholic head coach Rob Ambrose resigned in order to become the quarterbacks coach at Connecticut, and Mulholland was promoted as his replacement. He held that position for two seasons, and his teams compiled records of 4–6 (ODAC: 2–4) in 2002 and 3–7 (ODAC: 2–4) in 2003. In those seasons, Catholic finished sixth and fifth out of seven teams in the Old Dominion Athletic Conference (ODAC), respectively. Mulholland was fired and eventually replaced by former Catholic head coach Tom Clark.

In 2006, Mulholland became head coach for the Walter Johnson High School football team, which had posted a 0–10 record the prior season. The team continued its losing record, expanding it to a 36-game losing streak, before defeating Poolesville High School in the seventh game of the 2008 season.

Mulholland was married, had three children and resided in Gaithersburg, Maryland.

== Head coaching record ==
=== College ===
Year	Team	Overall	Conference	Standing	Bowl/playoffs
Catholic University Cardinals (Old Dominion Athletic Conference) (2002–2003)
2002	Catholic University	4–6	2–4	T–5th	
2003	Catholic University	3–7	2–4	5th	
Catholic University:		7–13	4–8		
Total:		7–13			
