= List of United States federal courthouses in Washington, D.C. =

Following is a list of current and former courthouses of the United States federal court system located in Washington, D.C., a national district with its own local government. Each entry indicates the name of the building along with an image, if available, its location and the jurisdiction it covers, the dates during which it was used for each such jurisdiction, and, if applicable the person for whom it was named, and the date of renaming. Dates of use will not necessarily correspond with the dates of construction or demolition of a building, as pre-existing structures may be adapted or court use, and former court buildings may later be put to other uses. Also, the official name of the building may be changed at some point after its use as a federal court building has been initiated.

== Courthouses ==
Courthouse	Image	Street address	Jurisdiction	First used	Last used	Notes
District of Columbia City Hall^{††}		451 Indiana Avenue NW	Various	1823	1952	Now in use by local government.
U.S. Supreme Court Bldg^{††}		1 First Street NE	U.S. Supreme Court (nationwide)	1935	present	
Howard T. Markey National Courts Bldg		717 Madison Place NW	Fed. Cir. (nationwide); Fed. Claims (nationwide)	1967	present	Named after Court of Appeals judge Howard Thomas Markey. Formerly known as the National Courts Building.
U.S. Tax Court Bldg		400 Second Street NW	U.S. Tax Court (nationwide)	1972	present	
E. Barrett Prettyman U.S. Courthouse		333 Constitution Avenue NW	D.D.C. D.C. Cir.	1952	present	Named after Court of Appeals judge E. Barrett Prettyman.
U.S. Court of Appeals for the Armed Forces bldg		450 E Street NW	C.A.A.F. (nationwide); D.C. Cir. (former)	1910	present	Utilized by the D.C. Cir. until it became the location of the C.A.A.F. in 1952.

== Key ==
^{†}	Listed on the National Register of Historic Places (NRHP)
^{††}	NRHP-listed and also designated as a National Historic Landmark
