= List of public art in Washington, D.C., Ward 5 =

This is a list of public art in Ward 5 of Washington, D.C.

This list applies only to works of public art accessible in an outdoor public space. For example, this does not include artwork visible inside a museum.

Most of the works mentioned are sculptures. When this is not the case (i.e. sound installation, for example) it is stated next to the title.

Title	Artist	Year	Location/GPS Coordinates	Material	Dimensions	Owner	Image
Black Men in Flight	Roderick Turner	1998	NE Deli Market, 1200 Mt Olivet Rd. N.E.			Washington Metro	
St. Dominic	Unknown	ca. 1905	Dominican House of Studies	Marble	Sculpture: approx. H. 8 ft. × 4 ft. × Diam. 5 ft.; Base: approx. H. 8 ft. × W. 5 ft. × Diam. 6 ft.	Dominican House of Studies	
Our Lady of the Immaculate Conception	Van Landeghern	1905	Dominican House of Studies	Marble & Stone	Sculpture: approx. H. 5 ft. × W. 2 ft. × Diam. 2 ft.; Base: approx. H. 1 ft. × W. 3 ft.	Dominican House of Studies	
McMillan Fountain	Herbert Adams	1912	McMillan Reservoir	Bronze	H. 12 ft.	McMillan Reservoir	
St. Vincent de Paul	Unknown	ca. 1900	Providence Hospital	Marble & Concrete	Sculpture approx. H. 9 ft.; Base: approx. 2 ft. 1 in. × 6 ft. 1 in. × 7 ft. 8 in.	Providence Hospital	
Victor S. Blundon Monument	Unknown	1936	Glenwood Cemetery 38°55′28.57″N 77°0′22.86″W	Granite	Sculpture: approx. 60 × 84 × 12 in.; Base: approx. 9 × 99½ × 22 in.	Glenwood Cemetery	
Benjamin C. Grenup Monument	Charles Rousseau	1858	Glenwood Cemetery – Section D, Chapel Circle 38°55′20″N 77°0′23″W	Marble		Glenwood Cemetery	
Eliza C. Mayo Monument	A. Gaddess	ca. 1850	Glenwood Cemetery	Marble		Glenwood Cemetery	
Teresina Vasco Monument	Sichi	1913	Glenwood Cemetery 38°55′29.55″N 77°0′25.91″W	Marble & Stone	Sculpture: approx. H. 33 in. W. 21 in.; Base: approx. H. 9 in. W. 58 in.	Glenwood Cemetery	
The Progress of the Negro Race	Dan Olney	1938	Langston Terrace Dwellings, 2209 H St., N.E. – entrance to courtyard playground	Terra Cotta	Overall: approx. H. 20 ft. W. 45 ft.	Langston Terrace Dwellings	
Mary Immaculate Accompanied by Angels	Ivan Meštrović	1959	Basilica of the National Shrine of the Immaculate Conception	Limestone	Sculpture: approx. H. 5 ft. W. 5 ft.	Basilica of the National Shrine of the Immaculate Conception	
Mary, Protector of Faith	Jon-Joseph Russo	2000	Basilica of the National Shrine of the Immaculate Conception 38°56′3.8″N 77°0′5.28″W	Limestone	75 x 24 x 20 in.	Basilica of the National Shrine of the Immaculate Conception	
Mary, Queen of the Universe	Ivan Meštrović	1959	Basilica of the National Shrine of the Immaculate Conception	Stone	Relief: approx. H. 15 ft. W. 7 ft.	Basilica of the National Shrine of the Immaculate Conception	
Shrine of the Immaculate Conception, South Entrance Portal Relief Figures	Lee Oskar Lawrie	1959	Basilica of the National Shrine of the Immaculate Conception	Stone	8 reliefs. Each relief: approx. H. 8 ft. W. 3 ft.	Basilica of the National Shrine of the Immaculate Conception	
Shrine of the Immaculate Conception, South Entrance Portal Relief Figures	Joseph Fleri	1959	Basilica of the National Shrine of the Immaculate Conception	Limestone	26 reliefs. Each relief: approx. 7 ft. × 3 ft. × 4 in.	Basilica of the National Shrine of the Immaculate Conception	
Six Early Saints	Ulysses Ricci	1959	Basilica of the National Shrine of the Immaculate Conception	Limestone		Basilica of the National Shrine of the Immaculate Conception	
Saint Mother Théodore Guérin	Teresa Clark	2006	Basilica of the National Shrine of the Immaculate Conception 38°56′4.31″N 77°0′4.36″W	Indiana Limestone	Sculpture: approx. h. 6½ ft.	Basilica of the National Shrine of the Immaculate Conception	
Split Ritual	Beverly Pepper	1993	United States National Arboretum 38°54′44.53″N 76°58′20.27″W	Ductile iron	Each vertical form: approx. H. 10 ft. W. 44 in.; Base: approx. Diam. 100 in.	United States Department of Agriculture	
Demeter	John Cavanaugh	1962	United States National Arboretum 38°54′49″N 76°57′29″W	Lead	Sculpture: approx. 30 × 10 × 13 in.; Base: approx. 26½ × 15½ × 15½ in.	United States Department of Agriculture	
Armillary Sphere	Paul Manship	1918	United States National Arboretum	Bronze	Sculpture: approx. Diam. 24 in.; Base: approx. H. 8 in. Diam 13½ in.	United States Department of Agriculture	
Edward Miner Gallaudet	Pietro Lazzari	1969	Gallaudet University	Bronze & Stone	Sculpture: approx. 7 ft. 3 in. × 3 ft. 1 in. × 3 ft. 2 in.; Base: approx. 3 ft. 10 in. × 4 ft. 8 in. × 4 ft. 9 in.	Gallaudet University	
Thomas Hopkins Gallaudet	Daniel Chester French	1889	Gallaudet University 38°54′20″N 76°59′43″W	Bronze	Sculpture: approx. 6 ft. × 3 ft. 9 in. × 4 ft. 3 in.; Base: approx. 4 ft. 2 in. × 6 ft. 5 in. × 7 ft.	Gallaudet University	
I am the Light of the World	Eugene Kormendi	1949	United States Conference of Catholic Bishops	Bronze	Sculpture: approx. H. 22 ft (10 tons).	United States Conference of Catholic Bishops	
Pope John Paul II	Maciej Zychowicz	1949	Blessed John Paul II Shrine	Bronze		Blessed John Paul II Shrine	
Saint Francis de Sales			Saint Francis de Sales Church			Saint Francis de Sales Church	
