= Governor Hoyt =

Governor Hoyt may refer to:

- Henry M. Hoyt (1830–1892), 18th Governor of Pennsylvania
- John Philo Hoyt (1841–1926), 4th Governor of Arizona Territory
- John Wesley Hoyt (1831–1912), 3rd Governor of Wyoming Territory
