= Glenwood Cemetery Mortuary Chapel =

Historic site in Washington, DC

- U.S. National Register of Historic Places
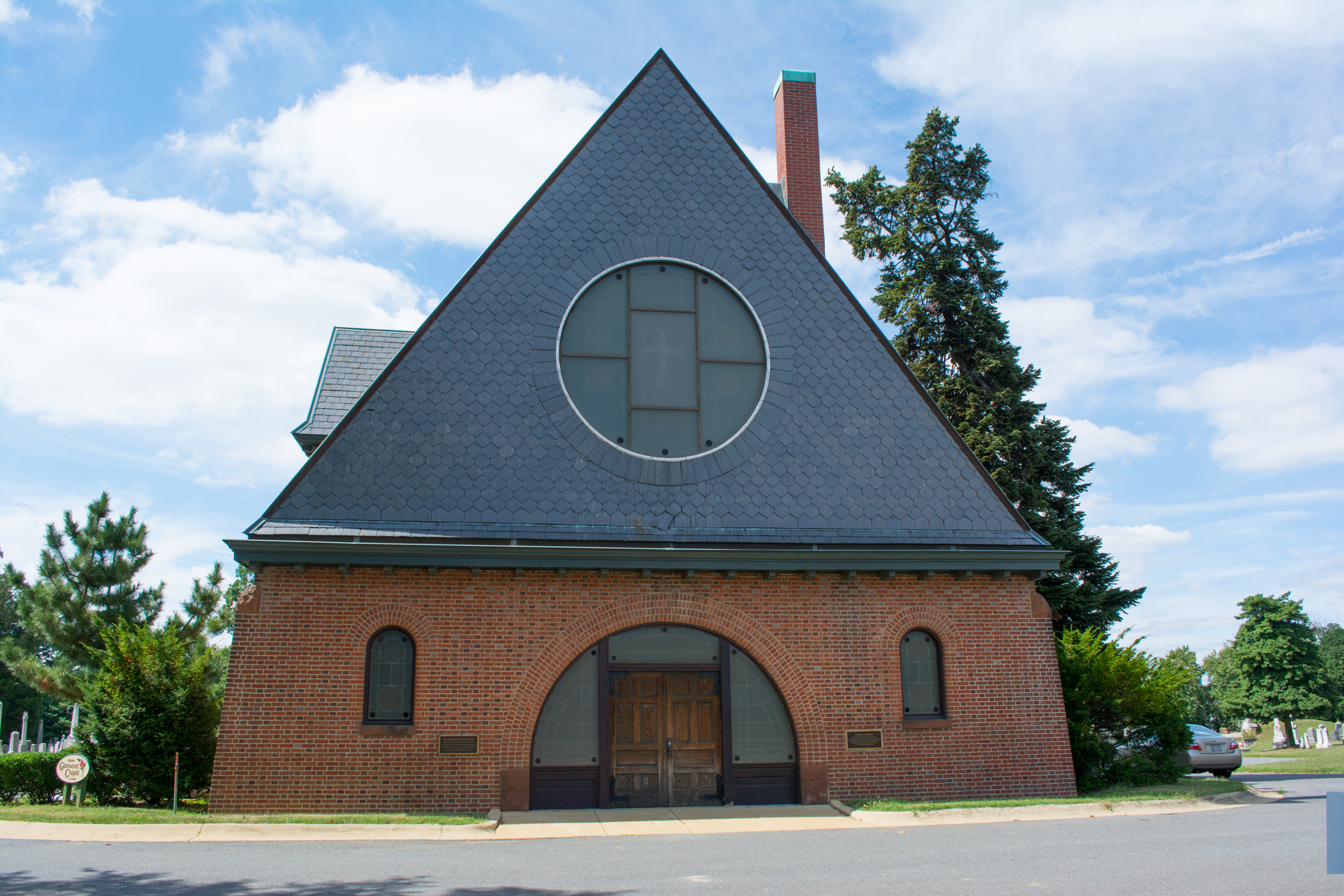
- Main entrance (east side) of Glenwood Chapel

- Location within District of Columbia
- Location: 2219 Lincoln Rd., NE, Washington, D.C.
- Coordinates: 38°55′19″N 77°0′22″W
- Area: less than one acre
- Built: 1892
- Architect: Glenn Brown, Frank N. Carver
- Architectural style: Romanesque, Richardsonian Romanesque
- NRHP reference No.: 88003064
- Added to NRHP: January 9, 1989

Glenwood Cemetery Mortuary Chapel is a historic chapel located in Glenwood Cemetery in Northeast, Washington, D.C.

It was built in 1892 in a Richardsonian Romanesque style. It was designed by Glenn Brown. The building was added to the National Register of Historic Places in 1989.

== See also ==
- Oak Hill Cemetery Chapel (Washington, D.C.)
- National Register of Historic Places listings in Northeast Quadrant, Washington, D.C.
