= John Wesley Hoyt =

American journalist

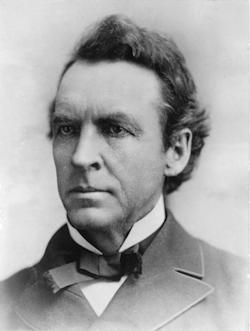

3rd Governor of Wyoming Territory
- In office April 10, 1878 – August 22, 1882
- Preceded by: John Milton Thayer
- Succeeded by: William Hale

Personal details
- Born: October 13, 1831 Worthington, Ohio, U.S.
- Died: May 23, 1912 (aged 80) Washington, D.C., U.S.
- Resting place: Glenwood Cemetery
- Party: Republican
- Spouse: Elizabeth Orpha Sampson Hoyt

John Wesley Hoyt (October 13, 1831 – May 23, 1912) was an American politician and educator. Hoyt was the third governor of Wyoming Territory.

== Early life ==
Hoyt was born in Worthington, Ohio, and graduated from the Ohio Wesleyan University in 1849. He attended the Cincinnati Law School and Ohio Medical College before attaining his medical degree from the Eclectic Medical Institute in Ohio in 1853.

== Career ==
In 1857, Hoyt moved to Wisconsin and became active in politics. While in Wisconsin, he served as manager of the Wisconsin State Agricultural Society and was editor for the Wisconsin Farmer and Northern Cultivator. He served as United States and Wisconsin commissioner to the 1862 International Exhibition in London and again at the 1867 Exposition Universelle in Paris. From 1874 to 1876, he was chairman of the Wisconsin Board of Railroad Commissioners.

On April 10, 1878, President Rutherford B. Hayes appointed Hoyt as governor of the Territory of Wyoming, replacing John Thayer. He served in that capacity until 1882.

Hoyt was a strong supporter of education. Under the direction of Secretary of State William H. Seward he prepared a large study on education in America and Europe. In 1887, following a brief time living in California, Hoyt returned to Wyoming to become the first president of the University of Wyoming. He later lobbied strongly for the creation of a national university. He died in Washington, D.C., on May 29, 1912, and was buried at Glenwood Cemetery.

== Legacy ==
John Wesley Hoyt is the namesake of Hoyt Peak in Yellowstone National Park.

Political offices
Preceded by John Thayer	Governor of Wyoming Territory; 1878–1882	Succeeded by William Hale
