= National Union Building =

- U.S. National Register of Historic Places
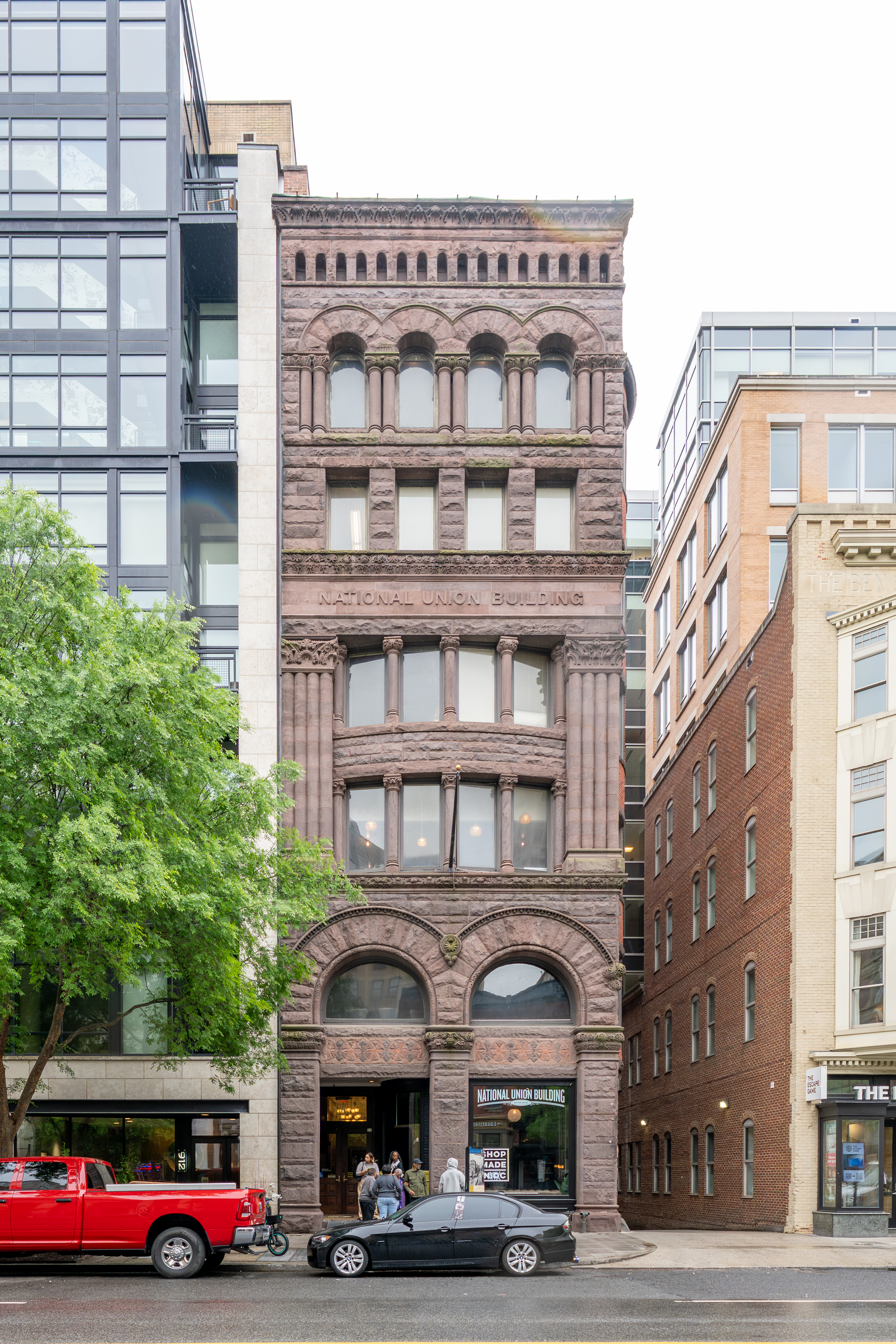
- National Union Building in 2026

- Location within Central Washington, D.C. Location within the District of Columbia Location within the United States
- Location: 918 F Street, N.W., Washington, D.C.
- Coordinates: 38°53′49.7″N 77°1′29.6″W
- Built: 1890
- Architect: Glenn Brown
- Architectural style: Romanesque
- NRHP reference No.: 90001375
- Added to NRHP: September 21, 1990

The National Union Building is a historic building, located at 918 F Street, Northwest, Washington, D.C., in the Penn Quarter neighborhood. It is currently owned by Douglas Development Corporation, and leased as an event and entertainment space

== History ==
It was designed by Glenn Brown in 1890, and is an example of the Richardsonian Romanesque style of architecture. The fire proof steel frame brownstone was built for the National Union Fire Insurance Company.

It was listed on the National Register of Historic Places in 1990, and is a contributing property to the Downtown Historic District.

It served as LivingSocial's "experience" building from 2013 - 2014.
