= Oak Hill Cemetery Chapel (Washington, D.C.) =

- U.S. National Register of Historic Places
- U.S. National Historic Landmark District – Contributing property
- D.C. Inventory of Historic Sites
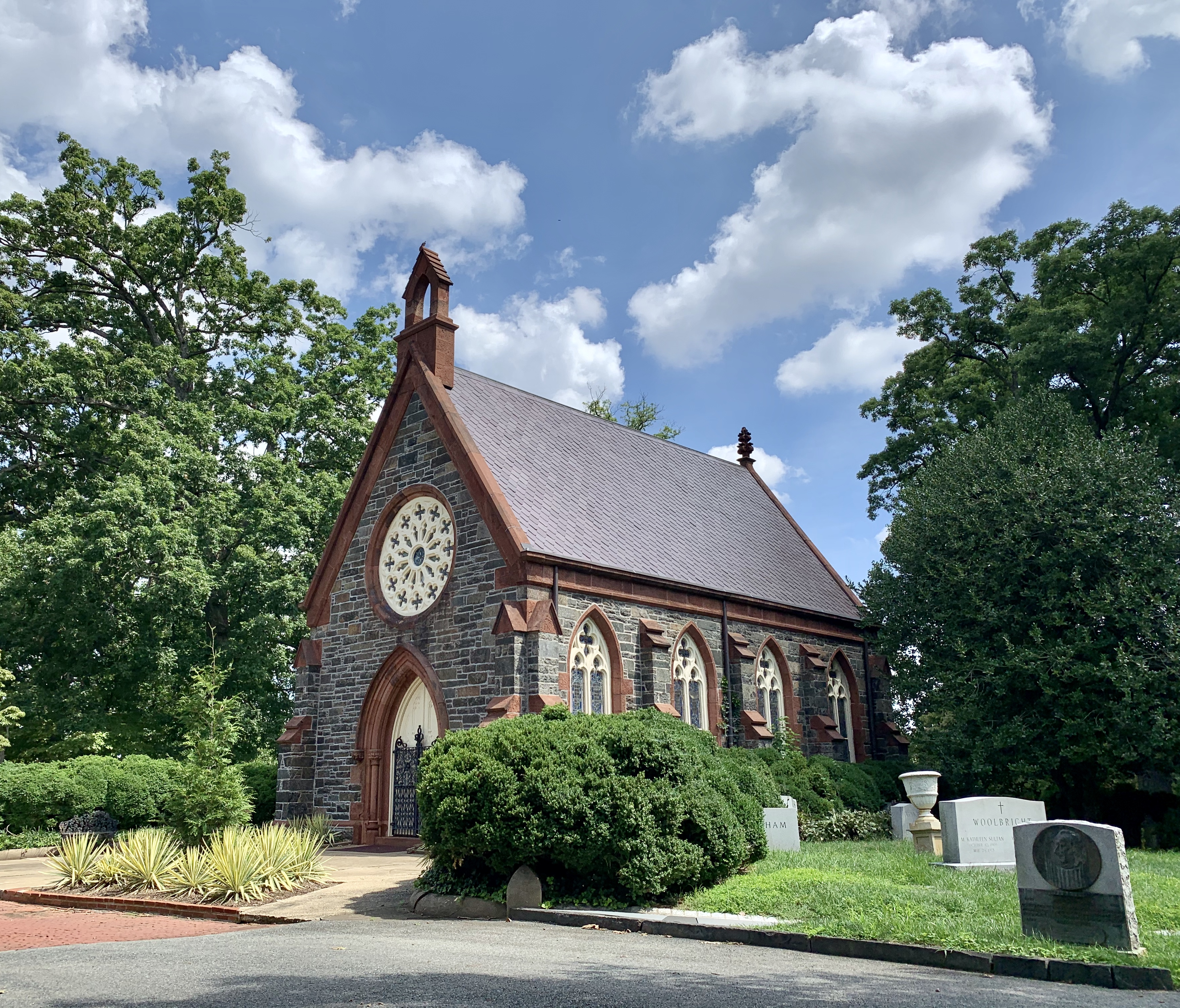
- Oak Hill Cemetery Chapel in 2020

- Location within Washington, D.C.
- Location: 30th and R Streets NW; Washington, D.C. United States
- Coordinates: 38°54′46″N 77°3′32″W
- Built: 1850
- Architect: James Renwick Jr.
- Architectural style: Gothic Revival
- Part of: Georgetown Historic District (ID67000025)
- NRHP reference No.: 72001429

Significant dates
- Added to NRHP: March 16, 1972
- Designated NHLDCP: May 28, 1967
- Designated DCIHS: November 8, 1964

The Oak Hill Cemetery Chapel, also known as the Renwick Chapel or James Renwick Chapel, is a historic building in the Georgetown neighborhood of Washington, D.C., United States. Designed by James Renwick Jr. in 1850, Oak Hill Cemetery Chapel is the architect's only known example of Gothic Revival church architecture in Washington, D.C. It is located on the highest ridge in Oak Hill Cemetery, near the intersection of 29th and R Streets NW. The chapel is one of two structures in Oak Hill Cemetery listed on the National Register of Historic Places, the other being the Van Ness Mausoleum. The chapel, mausoleum, and cemetery are contributing properties to the Georgetown Historic District, a National Historic Landmark.

== History ==
On June 7, 1848, businessman and philanthropist William Wilson Corcoran (1798–1888) purchased Parrott's Woods, a 15-acre (6.1 ha) forest overlooking Rock Creek Park, from Lewis Washington, great-grandnephew of President George Washington. Corcoran organized a company to establish a cemetery, and on March 3, 1849, the Oak Hill Cemetery Company was chartered by an Act of Congress.

Architect James Renwick Jr. (1818–1895) was chosen to design a small chapel for the new cemetery. Renwick, whose best known works include Grace Church, St. Patrick's Cathedral and the Corcoran Gallery of Art (currently the Renwick Gallery), began designing the chapel soon after he had finished the plans for the Smithsonian Institution Building. The cost of constructing Oak Hill Cemetery Chapel was $9,400, which was paid by Corcoran.

On March 16, 1972, the National Park Service added Oak Hill Cemetery Chapel to the National Register of Historic Places.

== Architecture ==
Oak Hill Cemetery Chapel is considered an excellent example of Gothic Revival architecture, and often called a "miniature Gothic gem". It features a steeply designed pitched roof, buttresses, and stained glass lancet windows accented with tracery. The chapel is a one-story, rectangular building measuring 23 feet (7.0 m) high and 41 feet (12 m) long.

The building materials consist of Potomac gneiss, sandstone, and wood. A cornerstone, inscribed with the date "1850", is located in a buttress on the chapel's northwest corner. The chapel is accessible by a large, painted door on the west side. The door is protected by a padlocked, wrought iron gate; the padlock bears the inscription: "Presented/Oak Hill Cemetery Co./By/James L. Norris/March 19, 1895." A rose window with wooden mullions is located above the door.

== Influence ==
The design of Grace Episcopal Church in DC, a Gothic Revival church built in 1867, is very similar to that of the nearby Oak Hill Cemetery Chapel. Although the architect of Grace Episcopal Church is unknown, there is reason to believe Renwick may have designed the building. If this isn't the case, the person who designed the church was greatly influenced by Renwick's work.

== See also ==
- Glenwood Cemetery Mortuary Chapel
- National Register of Historic Places listings in western Washington, D.C.
