= Joseph Beale House =

Historic house in Washington, D.C., United States

- U.S. National Register of Historic Places
- U.S. Historic district – Contributing property
- D.C. Inventory of Historic Sites
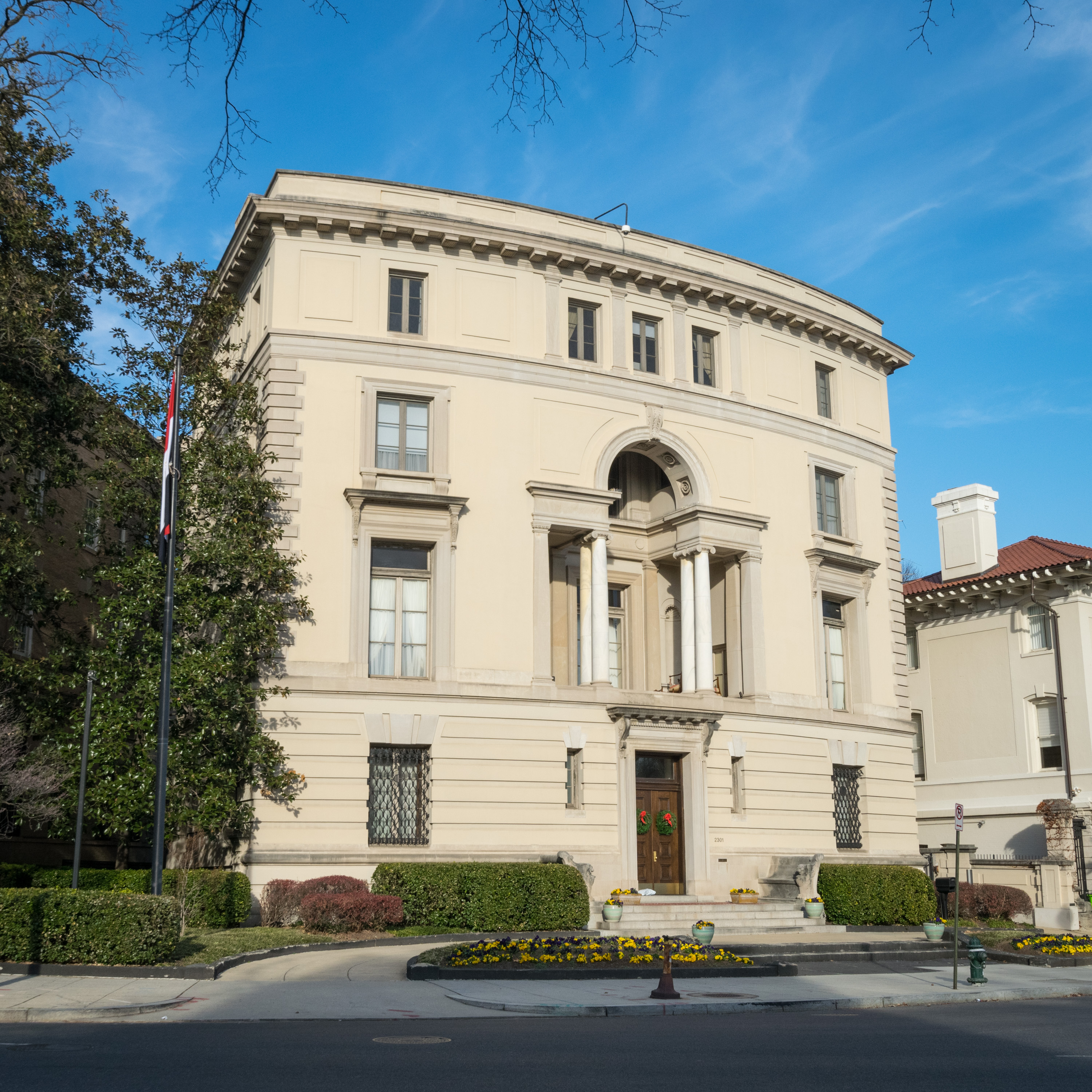

- Location within Washington, D.C.
- Location: 2301 Massachusetts Avenue, Northwest Washington, D.C., U.S.
- Coordinates: 38°54′46.2″N 77°3′3.7″W
- Built: 1909
- Architect: Glenn Brown
- Architectural style: Romanesque Revival
- Part of: Massachusetts Avenue Historic District (74002166); Sheridan-Kalorama Historic District (89001743)
- NRHP reference No.: 73002073

Significant dates
- Added to NRHP: May 8, 1973
- Designated CP: October 22, 1974; October 30, 1989
- Designated DCIHS: February 22, 1972

The Joseph Beale House is a historic residence located at 2301 Massachusetts Avenue, Northwest, Washington, D.C., in the Embassy Row neighborhood. It was added to the National Register of Historic Places on May 8, 1973.

== History ==
The residence was built between 1907 and 1909 by Washington architect Glenn Brown, who designed several buildings along Massachusetts Avenue. Designed for Mr. and Mrs. Joseph Beale, Brown used 18th century Romanesque Revival architecture for his design. In November 1928, Margaret K.C. Brown sold the residence to the government of Egypt for $150,000. Since then, it has served as the official residence of the Egyptian ambassador to the United States.

== See also ==
- Joseph Beale House (Embassy of Portugal)
