= Embassy of Portugal, Washington, D.C. =

Diplomatic mission of the Portuguese Republic to the United States

- Joseph Beale House (Embassy of Portugal in Washington, D.C.)
- U.S. Historic district – Contributing property
- D.C. Inventory of Historic Sites
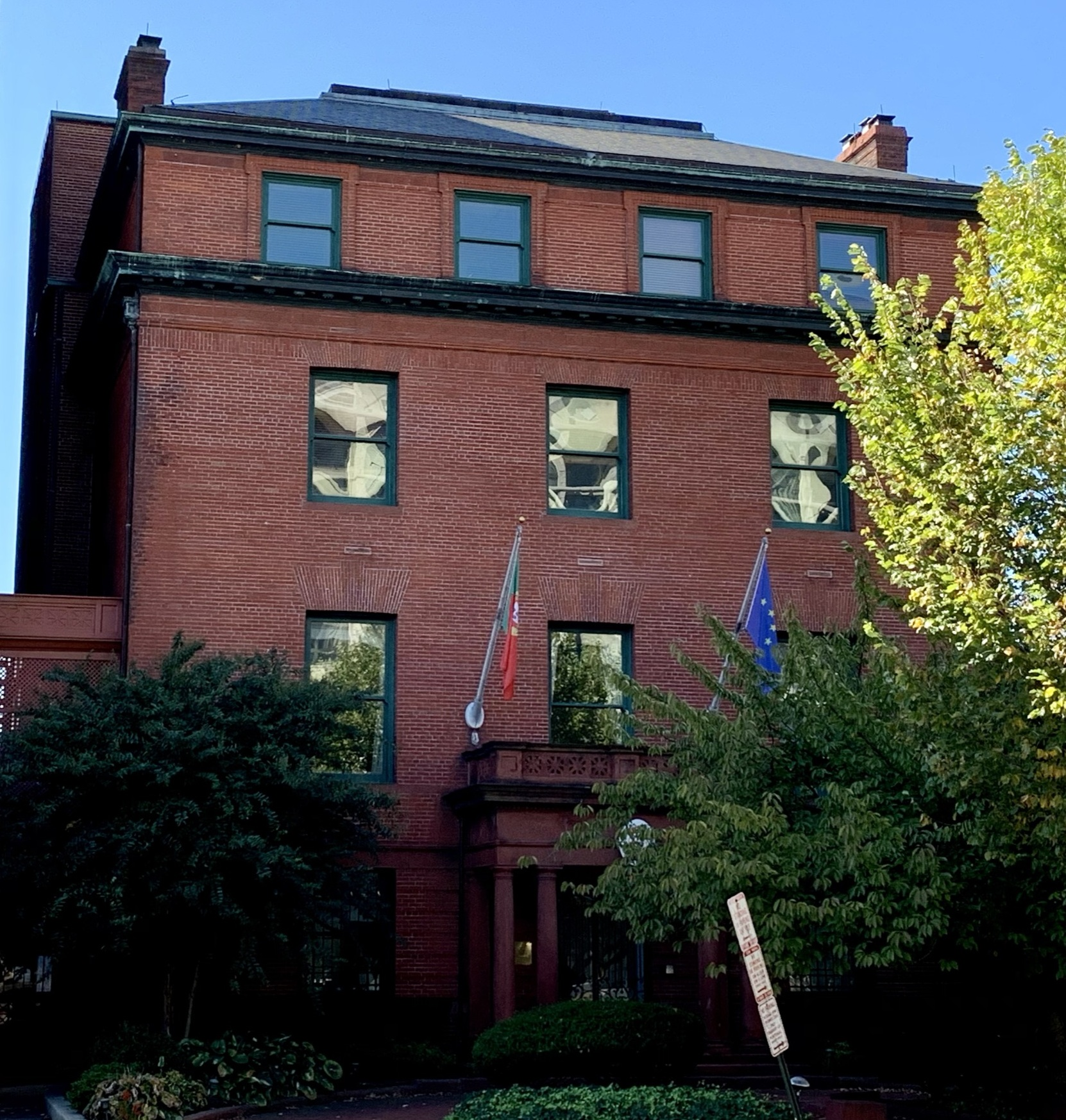
- Location: 2012 Massachusetts Avenue, Northwest, Washington, D.C.
- Coordinates: 38°54′36.5″N 77°2′44.6″W
- Part of: Massachusetts Avenue Historic District (ID74002166)

Significant dates
- Designated CP: October 22, 1974
- Designated DCIHS: November 8, 1964

The Portuguese Embassy in Washington, D.C. is the diplomatic mission of Portugal to the United States. The building is located at 2012 Massachusetts Avenue in Northwest, Washington, D.C., in the Embassy Row neighborhood.

== Consulates ==
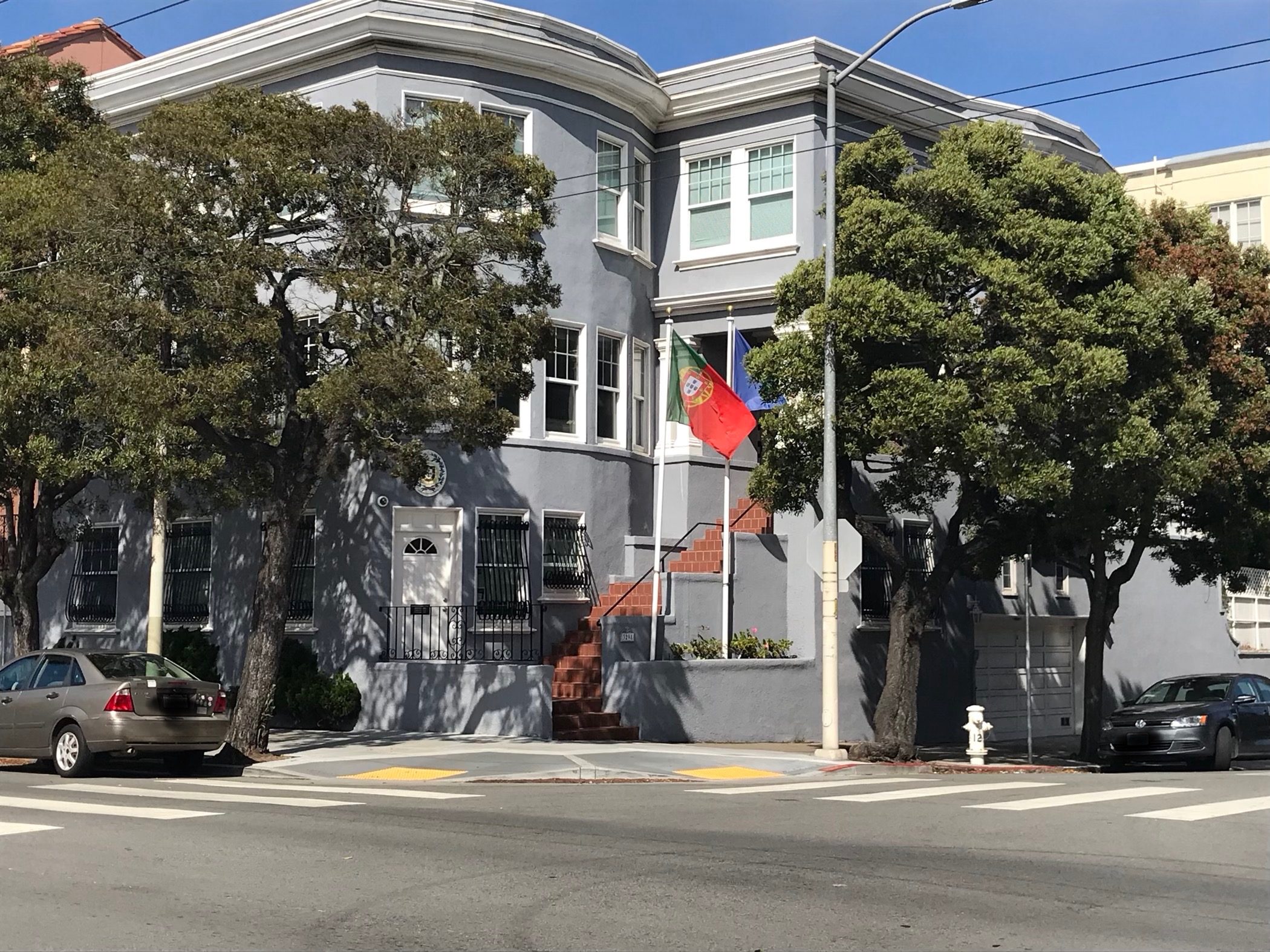
Consulate-General of Portugal in San Francisco

Portugal maintains a consular presence in the following places:

- Boston, Massachusetts (Consulate-General)
- Newark, New Jersey (Consulate-General)
- New York City, New York (Consulate-General)
- San Francisco, California (Consulate-General)
- New Bedford, Massachusetts
- Providence, Rhode Island
- Los Angeles, California
- San Diego, California
- Miami, Florida
- Chicago, Illinois
- Houston, Texas
- San Juan, Puerto Rico
- Phoenix, Arizona
- Honolulu, Hawaii
- Palm Coast, Florida
- New Orleans, Louisiana
- Indianapolis, Indiana
- Tulare, California
- Waterbury-Naugatuck, Connecticut

== See also ==
- Joseph Beale House (Egyptian ambassador's residence)
- List of Washington, D.C. embassies
