= Elizabeth O. Sampson Hoyt =

American poet

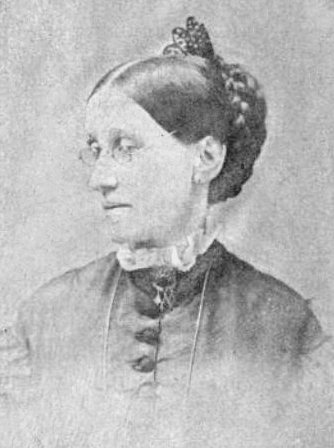
- Born: Elizabeth Orpha Sampson; December 7, 1828; Athens, Ohio, U.S.
- Died: September 22, 1912 (aged 83); Washington, D.C., U.S.
- Resting place: Glenwood Cemetery
- Education: Ohio University
- Occupations: philosopher, author, lecturer
- Spouse: John Wesley Hoyt (m. 1854)
- Children: 2
- Writing career
- Pen name: Aunt Libbie

Elizabeth O. Sampson Hoyt (née, Sampson; pen name, Aunt Libbie; December 7, 1828 – September 22, 1912) was an American philosopher, author, and lecturer of the long nineteenth century. She served as Vice President of the Universal Peace Union and Chair of the "National University Committee of Four Hundred".

== Early life and education ==
Elizabeth Orpha Sampson was born at Athens, Ohio, December 7, 1828. She was the fifth daughter of John and Mercy (or Marcia) Sampson.

An unusual interest in philosophy secured her, at ten years of age, special admission to the class in mental philosophy, taught by President William Holmes McGuffey, of the Ohio University. A year or two later, a special interest in the classics led to private study of Greek by firelight, as a result of which her vision was so impaired that she was obliged to wear glasses, and had very imperfect sight the remainder of her life. Though most fond of metaphysical studies, she possessed equal facility in the acquisition of mathematics and linguistics. Her ability to comprehend Paley, Butler, logic and the mathematics, when but a little girl, was impressive.

She wrote poetry from a childhood. By the age of fifteen, she had written a volume. While she was urged to publish it, Hoyt's modesty kept her from doing so.

== Career ==
Sometimes using the pen name, "Aunt Libbie", and always a lover of children, Hoyt, in early life, contributed many children's poems to newspapers and magazines, especially to The Atlantic, under the editorship of Horace Scudder, who paid her several times what he did any others for similar contributions, and who considered some of her poems so inimitable as to be capable of illustration, at that time, by but one artist in the U.S. She published several books for children, including Little George and his Hatchet : a lesson of Truth (1858).

When a young woman, she taught mental philosophy, French and mathematics in the Worthington (Ohio), Female Seminary.

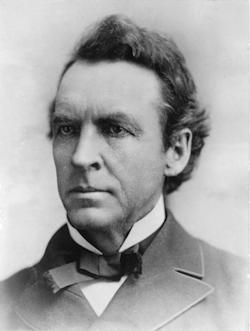
John Wesley Hoyt

On November 28, 1854, at Cincinnati, Ohio, she married Dr. John Wesley Hoyt, at that time professor of chemistry and medical jurisprudence in the Cincinnati College of medicine and in the Eclectic Medical Institute of Cincinnati. Subsequently, he became Professor in Antioch College, Ohio, and still later, Secretary of the Wisconsin State Agricultural Society, and editor of the Wisconsin Farmer. They had two sons: Zanoni (1855-1856) and Kepler (b. 1869).

Since the removal of Mr. Hoyt, in 1857, to Wisconsin, Mrs. Hoyt wrote more than for many previous years. Uniting with her philosophic tendencies the utmost practicality in domestic affairs, and not withstanding life-long physical weakness and further impairment of her sight by cataracts, Hoyt was yet able, with incidental assistance for her friends, to gain wide familiarity with ancient and modern literature, and wrote a number of papers, either published or read before institutions of learning, among the more important of which were: "The Horticultural Embellishment of School House Grounds", "On the Revolutionary Movement among Women", "A New Theory of the Immaculate Conception", "An Attempt to Find the Absolute by a Philosophic Method", "The Place of the Brownings in English Literature", "An Exposition of Schiller's Ballad, 'The Diver'", "Education", "Consciousness", "The Limits of Intellectual Cognition", and "Psychology in the Public Schools". Still others included: "Agricultural Resources of Wyoming", "Studies in Civil Service", "History of the World's Universities, Ancient, Mediaeval and Modern", "Memorial to U.S. Senate in Regard to a National University", and "University Progress".

From 1887 to 1890, Hoyt delivered the lectures on logic and psychology at the University of Wyoming, during the presidency of her husband.

In 1890, Hoyt, after an exhaustive examination, received the degree of Ph.D. from the University of Denver, reading as her thesis on that occasion a paper entitled, An Analysis of a Present State of Mind, the same being a radical examination of consciousness.

Hoyt was a member of the Society for Philosophical Inquiry, of Washington, D.C. In philosophy, she was a natural realist. She never belonged to any church because she could not accept any of the creeds. She had, however, an abiding conviction of the spirituality of the universe, of a personal God, and of personal immortality, with the endless development of the soul as associated with some form of organism.

Hoyt wrote between 100-200 short poems of an historical, romantic, political, sociological, and philosophical character, some of which were published in the Springfield Republican, The Peacemaker, and elsewhere.

Hoyt was one of the organizers and charter members of the original Woman's Mt. Vernon Association, and was always an active sympathizer with patriotic enterprises in general. Struggles for political and religious liberty always enlisted Hoyt's sympathies, and she had a deep interest in the poorer classes of society, as well as in woman's higher education, in woman's suffrage, and in general advancement of women.

== Death and legacy ==
She died from the effects of a stroke of paralysis, at the home of her son, Kepler Hoyt, Washington, D.C., on September 22, 1912. Interment was at Glenwood Cemetery. Some of her papers are held in the Manuscript Collections of the Bancroft Library.

== Selected works ==
=== Articles ===
- "The Horticultural Embellishment of School House Grounds"
- "A New Theory of the Immaculate Conception"
- "An Attempt to Find the Absolute by a Philosophic Method"
- "The Place of the Brownings in English Literature"
- "An Exposition of Schiller's Ballad, "The Diver""
- "Education"
- "Consciousness"
- "The Limits of Intellectual Cognition"
- "Psychology in the Public Schools"
- "Agricultural Resources of Wyoming"
- "Studies in Civil Service"
- "History of the World's Universities, Ancient, Mediaeval and Modern"
- "Memorial to U.S. Senate in Regard to a National University"
- "University Progress"

=== Children's books ===
- Little George and his Hatchet : a lesson of Truth ("written by Mrs. E.O. Hoyt, 'Aunt Libbie" to be sold for the benefit of the Mount Vernon Association")
