= John Frederick Parker =

American police officer

- Born: May 19, 1830; Winchester, Virginia, U.S.
- Died: June 28, 1890 (aged 60); Washington, D.C., U.S.
- Resting place: Glenwood Cemetery
- Occupation: Police officer
- Spouse: Mary America Maus (m. 1855)
- Children: 3

John Frederick Parker (May 19, 1830 – June 28, 1890) was an American police officer for the Metropolitan Police Department of the District of Columbia. Parker was one of four men detailed to act as United States President Abraham Lincoln's bodyguard on April 14, 1865, the night Lincoln was assassinated at Ford's Theatre.

== Life ==
Parker was born in 1830, in Virginia. No government or Bible record regarding Parker's specific birth date or more specific birth location other than Virginia has been published in government records. By 1855, Parker had moved to Washington, District of Columbia, where he married Mary L.C. Maus on July 16, 1855. U.S. Census population schedules reflect that he lived in the District of Columbia in 1860, 1870, and 1880. U.S. Census Records for 1890, which began shortly before Parker's death, are incomplete, as a result of a fire, and he does not appear in the remaining incomplete records.

== Career ==
In Washington, D.C., Parker worked as a carpenter. He became one of Washington's original police officers when the Metropolitan Police Department of the District of Columbia was created in 1861.

During his time as an officer, he was charged with dereliction of duty and conduct unbecoming an officer several times for being drunk on duty, sleeping on streetcars while at work, and visiting a brothel (Parker claimed the madam had sent for him). Parker was typically reprimanded for these acts but never fired.

== Lincoln's assassination ==
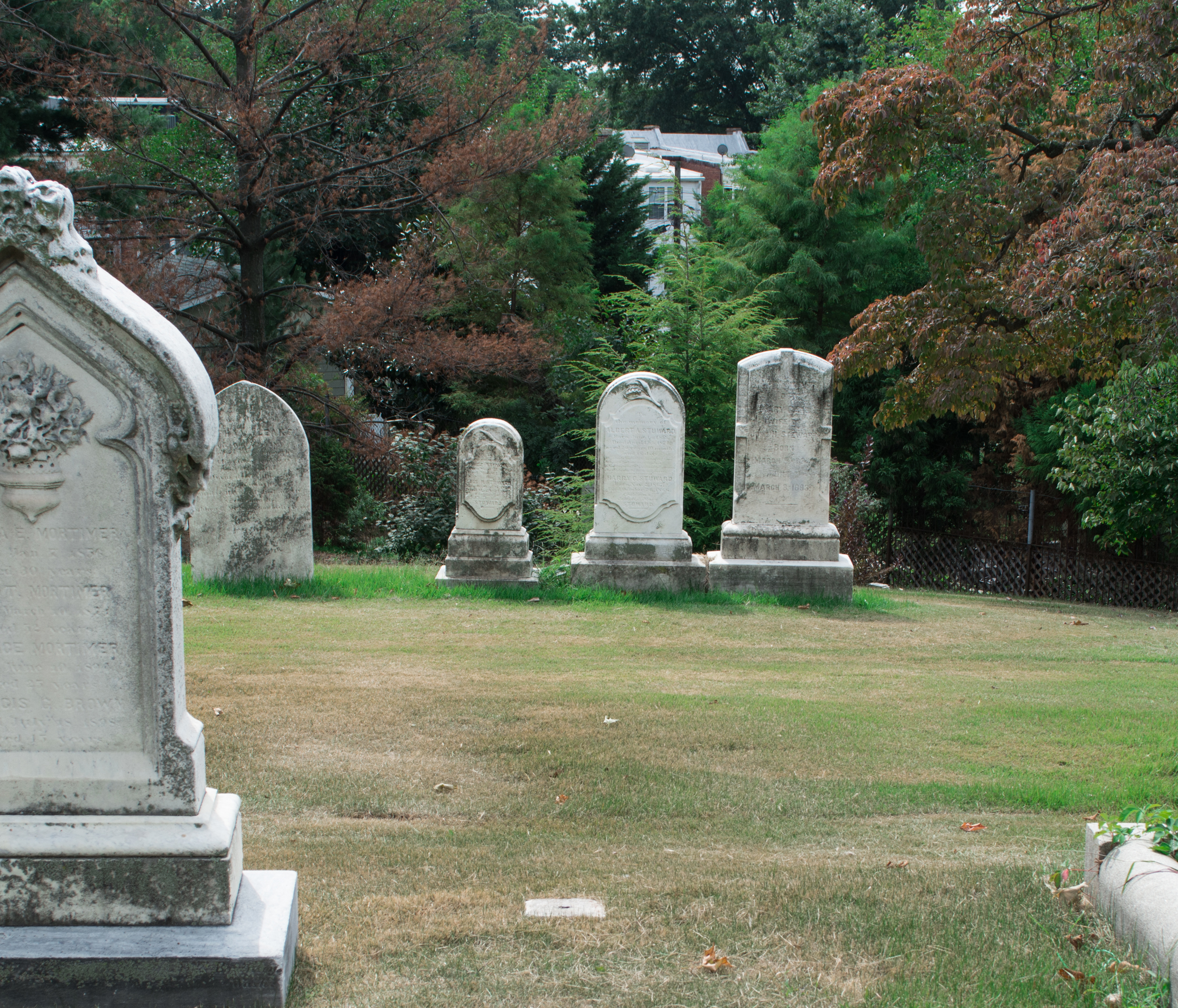
Unmarked grave of John Frederick Parker at Glenwood Cemetery.

On April 14, 1865, President Lincoln, his wife Mary Todd Lincoln, Major Henry Rathbone and his fiancée Clara Harris were attending the play Our American Cousin at Ford's Theatre. Parker was assigned to guard the entrance to the President's box where the four were seated. He is known to have, at first, stayed at his assigned post, but he later told family members that he was then released by Lincoln until the end of the play. During the intermission, Parker went to a nearby tavern with Lincoln's valet and coachman, got drunk and fell asleep.

It is unclear whether Parker ever returned to the theater, but he was not at his post when John Wilkes Booth shot the President. Parker was charged with neglect of duty and tried on May 3, 1865, but no transcripts of the case were kept. The complaint was dismissed on June 2, 1865. Despite leaving his post the night Lincoln was shot, Parker was still assigned to work security at the White House. Before Mary Todd Lincoln moved out of the White House following her husband's death, Parker was assigned as her bodyguard. Mrs. Lincoln's dressmaker Elizabeth Keckley overheard Mrs. Lincoln yell to Parker, "So you are on guard tonight, on guard in the White House after helping to murder the President." Parker attempted to defend himself stating that he "could never stoop to murder much less to the murder of so good and great a man as the President. I did wrong, I admit, and have bitterly repented." Mrs. Lincoln told Parker that she would always think he was responsible for the President's death and angrily dismissed him from the room.

== Later years and death ==
Parker remained on the police force until 1868 when he was fired for sleeping on duty. He later went back to work as a carpenter.

He died of pneumonia complicated by asthma and exhaustion in Washington, D.C., on June 28, 1890. He was buried in an unmarked grave at Glenwood Cemetery. His widow, Mary America Maus, was buried next to him upon her death in 1904, as were their three children. There are no known verified images of him.
