= Frederic De Frouville =

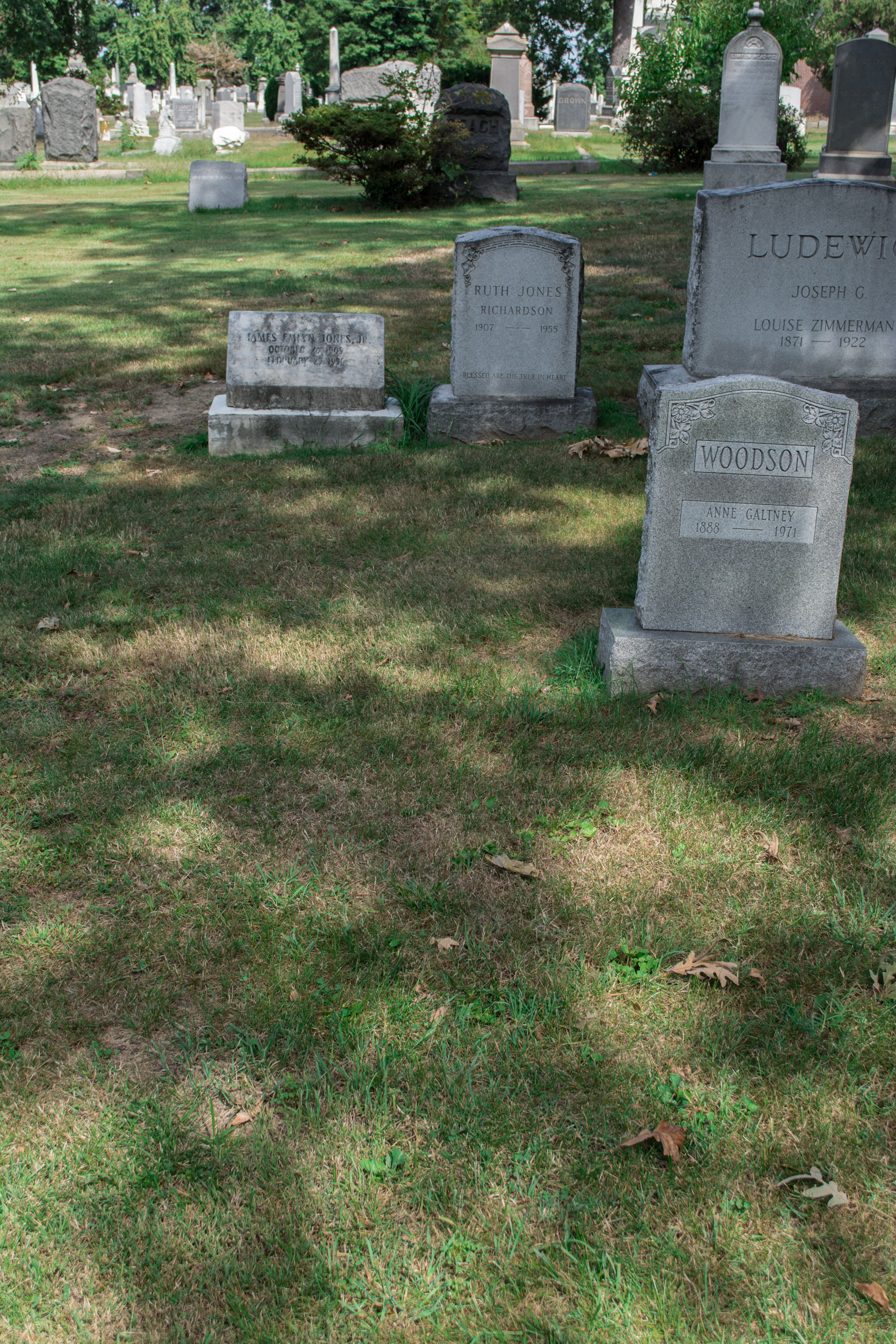
- Unmarked grave of Frederic De Frouville, just to the left of the Woodson burial
- Born: 1850; Virginia, U.S.
- Died: April 4, 1883 (aged 33); Washington, D.C., U.S.
- Cause of death: Suicide
- Resting place: Glenwood Cemetery
- Occupation: Civil servant
- Spouse: Andrea Marie Wolstrup De Frouville
- Status: Committed suicide before arrest
- Criminal charge: Murder

Details
- Victims: Andrea Marie Wolstrup De Frouville
- Date: April 4, 1883
- Locations: Washington, D.C.
- Weapon: Pistol

Frederic De Frouville (Virginia, c. 1850 – April 4, 1883) was an American noted for committing a murder-suicide in Washington, DC. De Frouville murdered his estranged wife, Andrea De Frouville, née Andrea Marie Wolstrup in Denmark, on April 4, 1883, and then shot and killed himself. She had legally separated from him the previous November because of his heavy drinking and abuse of her.

== Early life and education ==
Frederic De Frouville was born about 1850 in Virginia. His father was Frederick De Frouville, a French national who had emigrated to the United States in the 1840s and became a citizen in 1848, and his mother was Orsena Bestor of Harpers Ferry, West Virginia. He also had a sister.

By his maternal aunt Maria L. Bestor's marriage, the younger Frederic was a nephew of Aaron Van Camp. The dentist served as a spy in Washington, DC for the Confederate States of America during the Civil War.

== Career ==
De Frouville worked for a time in New Orleans at the United States custom house. He returned to Washington, DC about 1873 and worked in various capacities in the capital. In 1877, at the time of his marriage, he worked in the Signal Corps, but was dismissed because of his repeated episodes of heavy drinking (described as "dissipation" in articles of the time). He later entered the Coastal Survey (today's Coast Guard). Due to his drinking, he was dismissed from this job as well.

== Marriage and family ==
On September 12, 1877, in Baltimore, De Frouville married Andrea Marie Wolstrup, an immigrant from Denmark who had come to Washington, DC in 1871. She left a sister and half-brother behind. Her friends had recommended against her marriage to De Frouville because they considered him too wild and reckless.

Wolstrup, recognized as an "excellent linguist," was then working as a translator in the Dead Letter office of the US Post Office. She had been aided in finding work by Col. Charles C. Sheats, then the US Consul to Elsinore, Denmark, whom she had met on the ship to the United States. (In 1872 he was elected to Congress as a Republican Party representative from Alabama.) After her marriage, Andrea De Frouville continued to work at the Post Office under her maiden name. She resigned after becoming pregnant, but the child died soon after birth.

Andrea De Frouville obtained a separation from her husband in November 1882 and started divorce proceedings because of his heavy drinking and abuse of her. Their marriage had been troubled for some time, and she had first consulted a lawyer about a separation in 1879 due to her husband's abuse. After the separation, she gained a clerkship as a translator in the Department of Agriculture due to the recommendation of Senator Benjamin Harvey Hill. Friends warned her of De Frouville's threats against her in the weeks before her death, and her attorney advised her to have him arrested.

== Background ==
At the time of the murder/suicide, Andrea De Frouville, a skilled linguist, worked as a translator in the US Department of Agriculture. She had gained the job in 1882 by the recommendation of the Senator Benjamin Harvey Hill of Georgia, who died later that year.

An inquest determined that Andrea De Frouville was giving German lessons to an 18-year-old neighbor, George W. Buckingham, when her estranged husband entered her residence. The youth testified that Mrs. De Frouville asked him to get the police and he escaped out the back door. Her husband shot her in the head, killing her, and then shot himself with the same revolver before Buckingham could return with police.

After the inquest, Andrea De Frouville was buried in the Congressional Cemetery and Frederic De Frouville in Glenwood Cemetery.
