= Louis Gathmann =

American engineer and inventor (1843–1917)

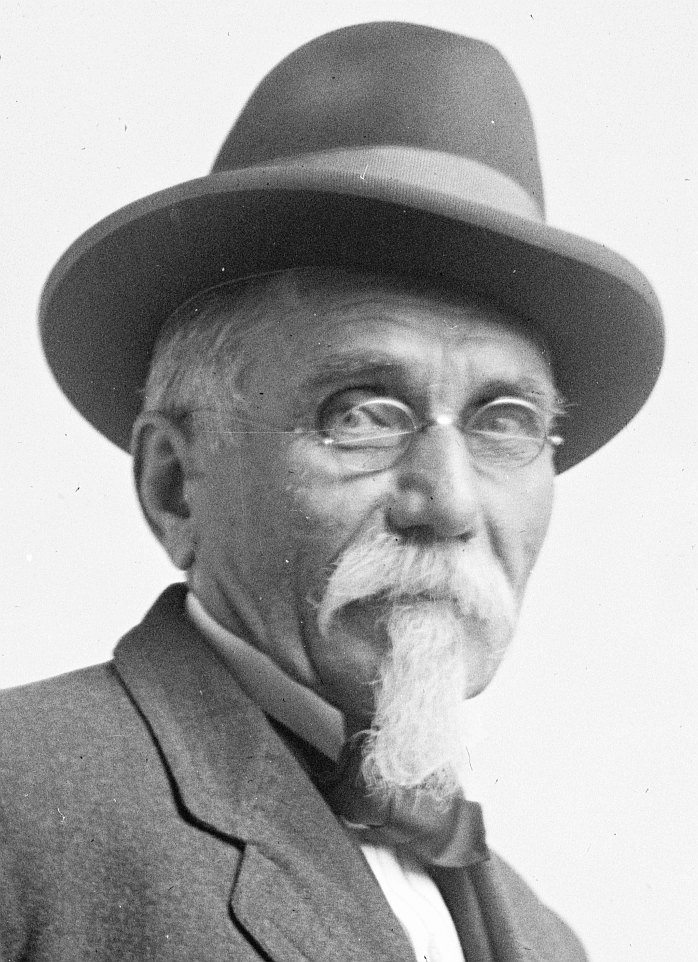
- Gathmann in 1914
- Born: Louis Gathmann; August 11, 1843; Kingdom of Hanover
- Died: June 3, 1917 (aged 73); Washington, D.C., U.S.
- Resting place: Glenwood Cemetery
- Occupation: Weapons designer
- Spouses: Henrietta Schroeder (m. 1872) Henrietta Ehlert (m. 1882)
- Children: 5

Louis Gathmann (August 11, 1843 – June 3, 1917) was a German American engineer and an inventor who is best remembered as the inventor of the Gathmann gun, a large howitzer.

== Early life ==
Gathmann was born in 1843 in Hanover. His father was a school teacher, and instilled in his son a lifelong love of astronomy.

== Career ==
He moved to the United States in 1864, and eventually moved to Chicago where he lived until the end of the 19th century, when he moved to Washington, D.C. He started his career designing equipment for mills and farms, and held numerous patents. By the 1880s, Gathmann's patents were in such demand that he had to form a company to help track and produce his designs. This company, known as the Garden City Mill Furnishing Company, made milling machines which were sold all over the globe.

By the 1880s, Gathmann had made enough money to have his family moved to the United States from Prussia. He also had four mansions built, two in Chicago, one in Washington D.C., and one in Baltimore, Maryland. Gathmann was very interested in astronomy and had three observatories built in the Chicago area during the 1880s, one of which was a domed observatory tower which he had installed on the side of his mansion on Lincoln Avenue.

In the 1890s, Louis had invented a "Sectional Telescope Lens" (US Patent 531,994, and 591,466). The design called for using individual pre-ground disks of glass mounted in a black matrix. The entire assembly would then be ground as if it were a traditional single-piece telescope lens blank. This would allow for a faster and cheaper method of producing large diameter telescope lenses for institutional observatories. He had been in negotiations with Alfred Huntington Isham to produce a 100-ft diameter telescope for the Proctor Memorial Fund, with the plan calling for an international observatory on Mt. San Miguel and renaming the mountain as Mt. Gathmann.

Louis was also involved in 19th century weather modification projects, and in 1891 received a patent (US Patent 462,795) for a rain-making in which liquid carbon dioxide was released into the atmosphere by explosion (either from an artillery shell or by being carried aloft by a balloon). He also wrote a book on the subject, Rain Produced At Will. The book included a chapter by the scientist Simon Newcomb, and another by Edwin J. Houston who would later go on to co-found General Electric. After World War II, when General Electric was experimenting with Rainmaking (now called Weather modification) Stanford Law Review stated: "In fact, if one Gathmann were alive today, and his patent had not long since expired, he might have an action for patent infringement."

From the 1890s on, Louis Gathmann focused on ordnance development. The largest gun designed by Gathmann was the 18-inch Gathmann Gun, which was a coastal defense gun manufactured by Bethlehem Steel under Emil Gathmann (head of Bethlehem Steel's Ordnance Section, and one of Gathmann's sons). The gun was tested at Sandy Hook, but the projectile performed far worse than traditional armor-piercing rounds. Louis was also involved with early aircraft development and had attempted to develop a helicopter, but his successes came in developing fuses for high-explosive ordnance. Newspapers reported in the spring of 1915 that Gathmann invented the German 42-cm Big Bertha howitzer, and that these plans were subsequently stolen from the U.S. Patent Office. But these rumors were false, as no such blueprints were ever filed.

During World War I, Louis conceived a multi-hull naval armor design which incorporated buffer zones, shocks and deflectors.

== Personal life ==
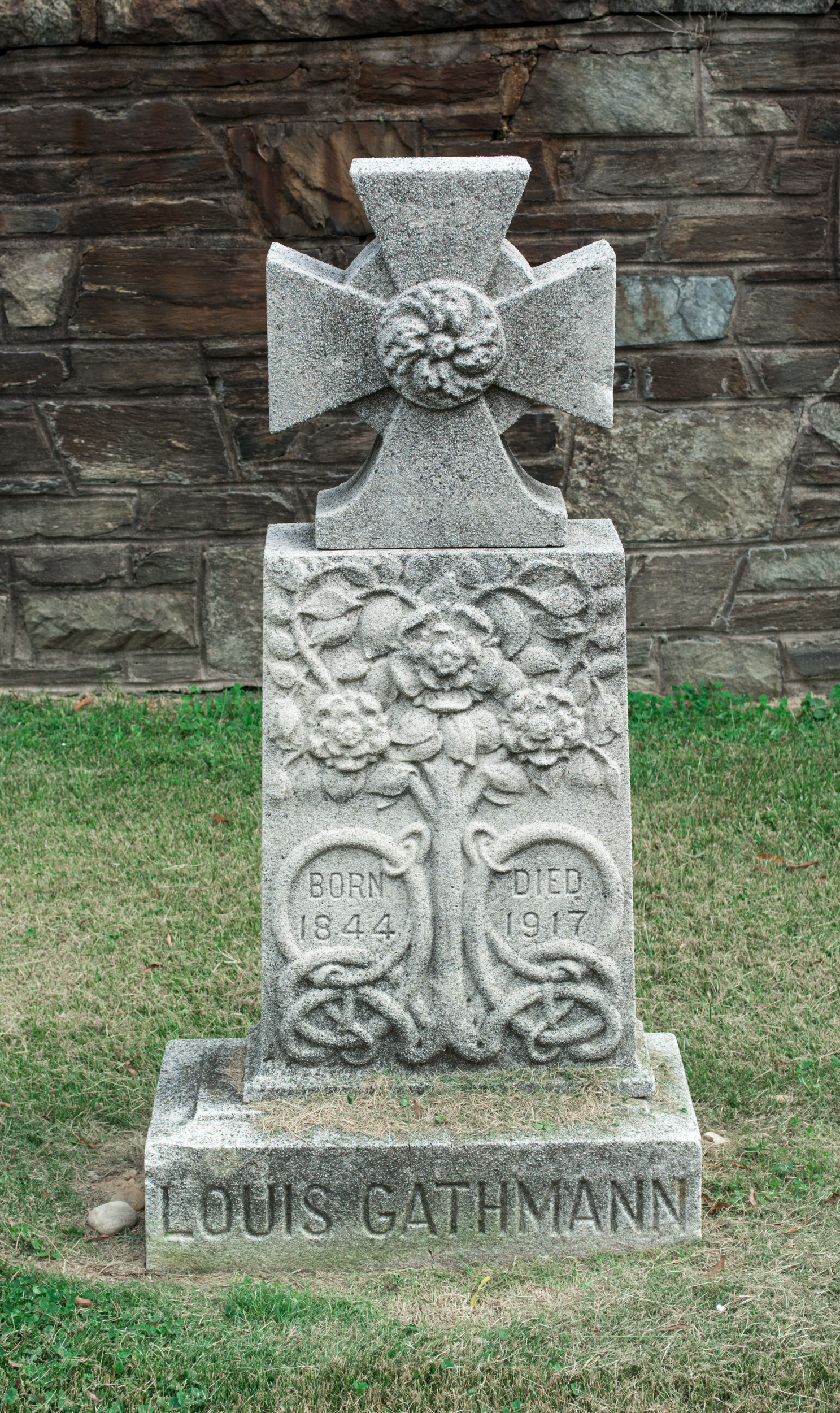
Grave of Louis Gathmann at Glenwood Cemetery.

Gathmann was married. He had three sons and two daughters, Otto, Emil, Paul, Mrs. Foley and Emma.

Gathmann died on June 3, 1917, at the home of his daughter in Washington, D.C. He was buried in Glenwood Cemetery.

== Bibliography ==
- Advisory Committee on Weather Control (1958). Final Report. Volume 1. Washington, D.C.: U.S. Government Printing Office.
- Faust, Albert Bernhard (1909). The German Element in the United States With Special Reference to Its Political, Moral, Social, and Educational Dnfluence. Boston: Houghton Mifflin Co. ISBN 9780790565873.
- "Louis Gathmann's Private Observatory". The Northwestern Miller. March 11, 1881.
- "Notes". The Northwestern Miller. December 18, 1901.
