= Teresina Vasco Monument =

Artwork by Andrea Sichi in Glenwood Cemetery, Washington, DC

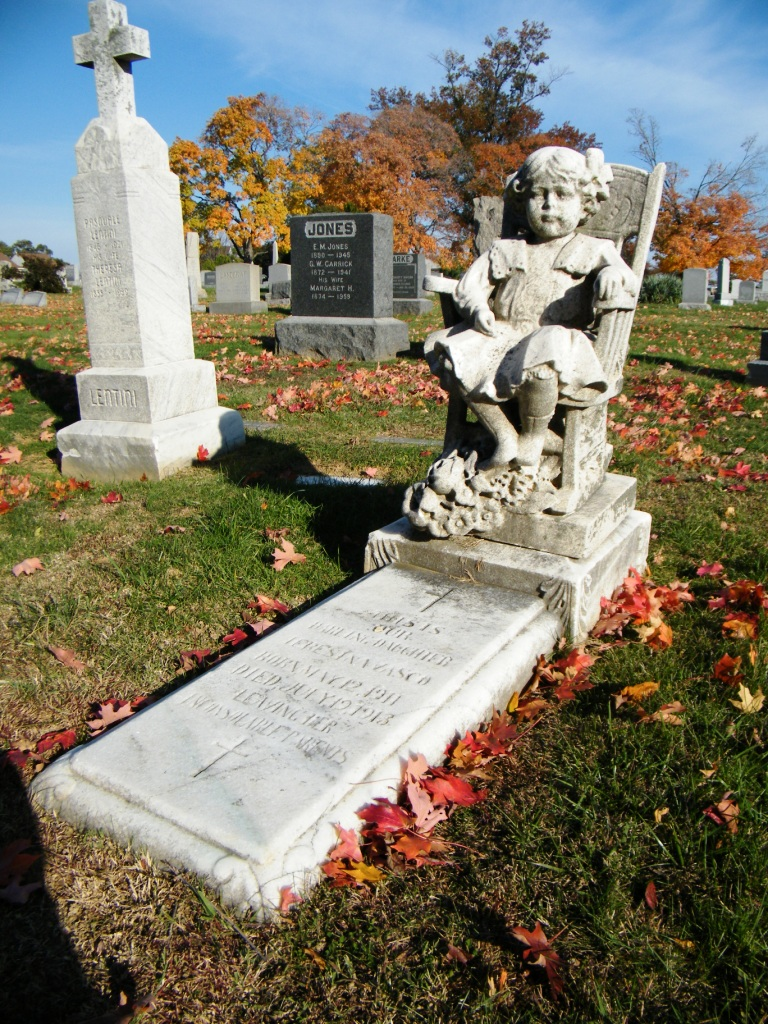
- Artist: Andrea Sichi
- Year: 1913
- Type: Marble
- Dimensions: 84 cm × 53 cm (33 in × 21 in)
- Location: Washington, D.C., United States; 38°55′29.55″N 77°0′25.91″W
- Owner: Glenwood Cemetery

The Teresina Vasco Monument is a public artwork by Andrea Sichi, located at Glenwood Cemetery in Washington, D.C., United States. "Teresina Vasco Monument" was surveyed as part of the Smithsonian Save Outdoor Sculpture! survey in 1994. It serves as the final resting place for the young Teresina Vasco.

== Description ==
This sculpture shows a full-size portrait of a girl (Teresina Vasco) sitting in a small rocking chair. Her feet and the chair are placed on a pile of flowers, which sits on a square base at the head of a tombstone. She looks off to the right and her proper left arm rests on the arm of the chair. She wears a dress with a lace collar and her hair is curly and tied back in bows.

The bottom front of the tombstone is inscribed:

THIS
IS
OUR
DARLING DAUGHTER
TERESINA VASCO
BORN MAY 12, 1911
DIED JULY 19, 1913
LEAVING HER
INCONSOLABLE PARENTS

== Gallery ==
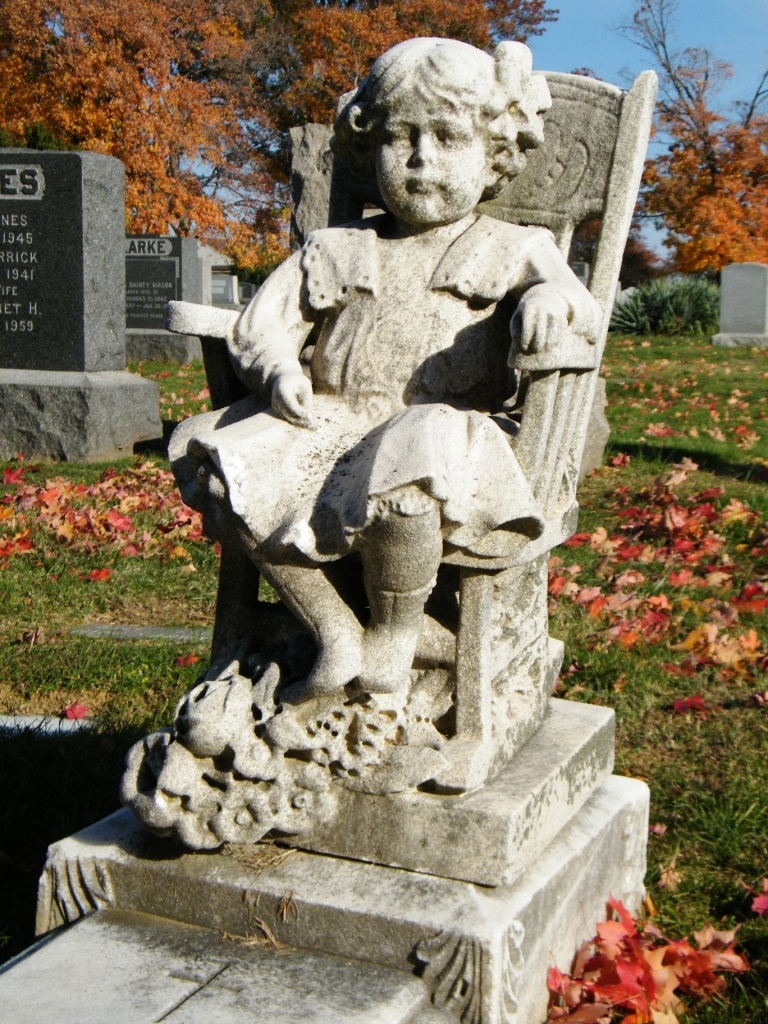
Detail

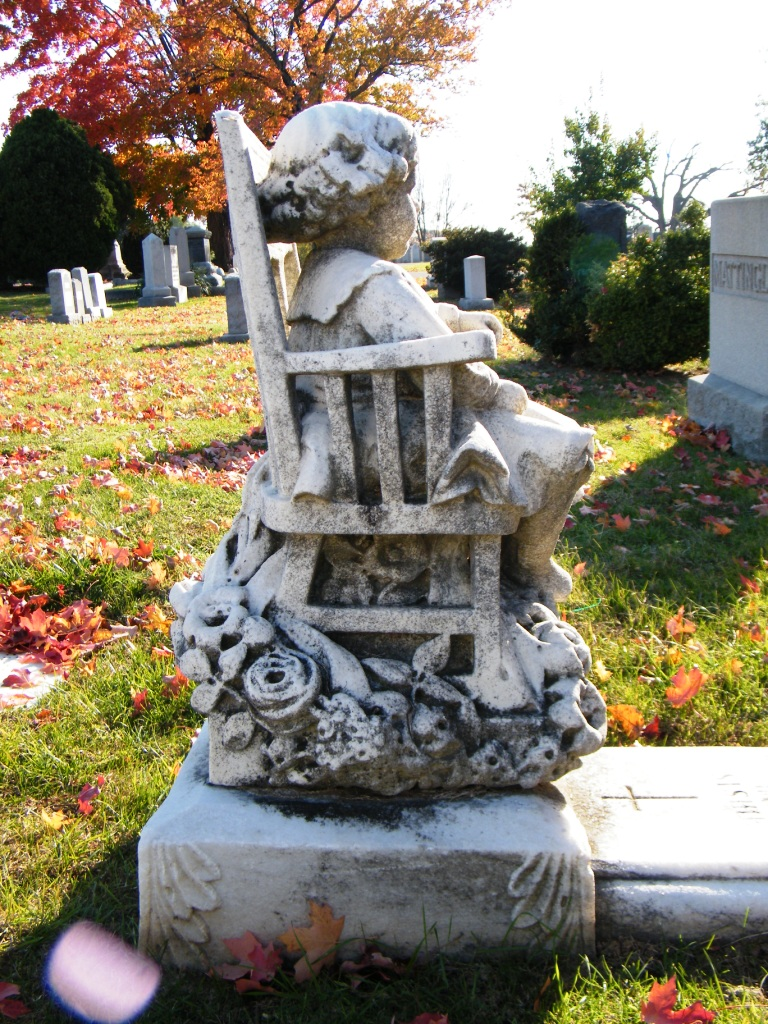
Proper Left

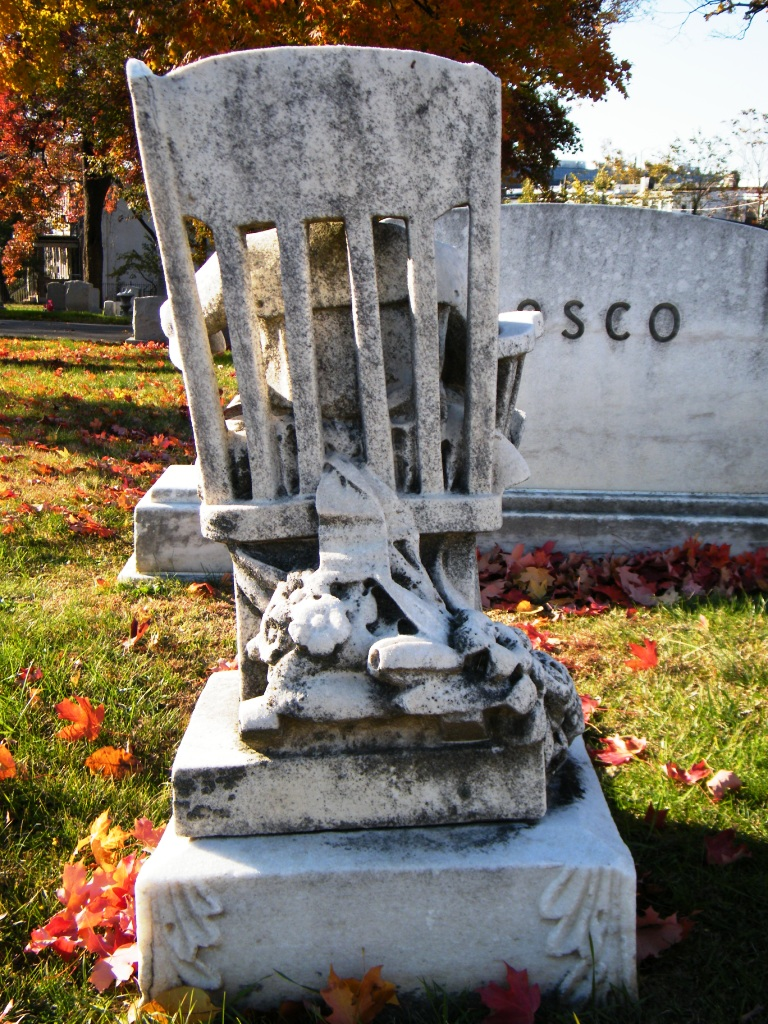
Back

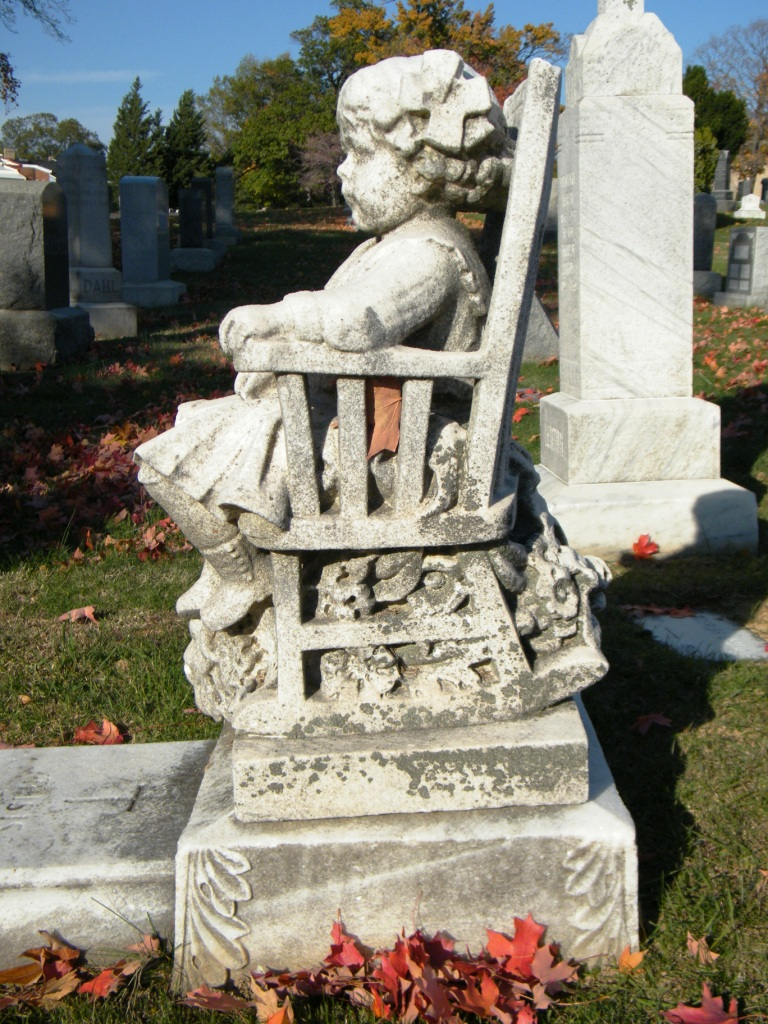
Proper Right

== Artist ==
The artist Andrea Sichi worked in the Washington DC area for many years after immigrating to the United States in 1904.

== Condition ==
This sculpture was surveyed in 1994 for its condition and it was described that treatment is needed.

== See also ==
- List of public art in Washington, D.C.
