= Glenwood Cemetery (Washington, D.C.) =

Cemetery in Washington, D.C

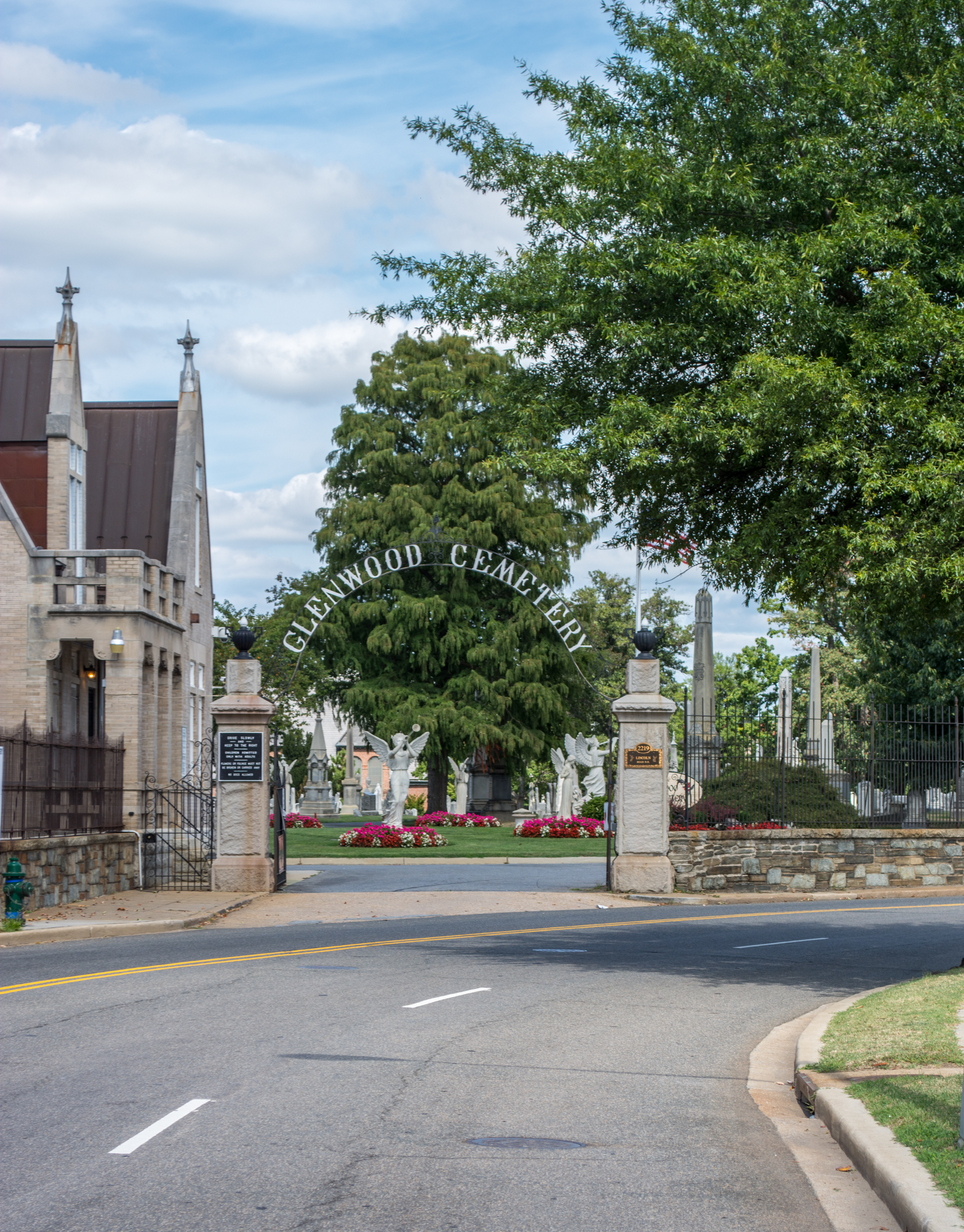
- Entrance to Glenwood Cemetery
- Interactive map of Glenwood Cemetery

Details
- Established: 1854
- Location: Edgewood, Washington, D.C.
- Country: United States
- Coordinates: 38.9229°N 77.0060°W
- Type: private, secular
- Owned by: The Glenwood Cemetery, Inc.
- Size: 90 acres (360,000 m^{2})
- Website: Official website
- Find a Grave: Glenwood Cemetery
- The Political Graveyard: Glenwood Cemetery

Glenwood Cemetery is a historic cemetery located at 2219 Lincoln Road NE, in Washington, D.C. It is a private, secular cemetery owned and operated by The Glenwood Cemetery, Inc. Many famous people are buried in the cemetery, which is known for its elaborate Victorian and Art Nouveau funerary monuments. The cemetery was listed on the National Register of Historic Places in 2017; its mortuary chapel was separately listed in 1989.

== History ==
=== 19th century ===
On June 5, 1852, the Council of the City of Washington in the District of Columbia passed a local ordinance that barred the creation of new cemeteries anywhere within Georgetown or the area bounded by Boundary Street (northwest and northeast), 15th Street (east), East Capitol Street, the Anacostia River, the Potomac River, and Rock Creek. A number of new cemeteries were therefore established in the rural areas in and around Washington, D.C.: Columbian Harmony Cemetery in D.C.; Gate of Heaven Cemetery in Silver Spring, Maryland; Mount Olivet Cemetery in D.C.; and Woodlawn Cemetery in D.C.

The property which became Glenwood Cemetery was first owned by John Dixon, and original patentee of the District of Columbia. In 1809, Dixon sold the land to Dr. Phineas Bradley. Bradley renamed it Clover Hill, and built a large home in the northeast corner of the land. Bradley entertained some of the city's most notable residents, including Senator Henry Clay. Bradley sold the property in 1845, and it changed hands many times over the next nine years. By 1854, it was owned by Junius J. Boyle.

In June 1852, Joseph B. Close, William S. Humphreys, Randolph S. Evans, and George Clendenin purchased the 90-acre (360,000 m^{2}) Clover Hill from Junius J. Boyle for $9,000 for the purpose of creating a secular cemetery. Humphreys put a high fence around 30 acres (120,000 m^{2}) of the site and laid out walks and roads. Clendenin was appointed superintendent of the cemetery in March 1853. Close had loaned Humphreys $27,000 to make his improvements, and in April 1853 Humphreys gave Close a 50 percent interest in the premises. The remaining half interest was given to Close in June 1854. Close agreed that if Humphreys repaid the debt, Close would give him half the land back.

On July 27, 1854, Congress passed legislation granting a congressional charter to and establishing The Proprietors of Glenwood Cemetery. The cemetery association was governed by a board of 12 people (who had invested a total of $100,000 in creating the cemetery): Four from the District of Columbia, plus Close, Humphreys, Evans, and William Phelps (a resident of New Jersey). The board was empowered to appoint a president and three managers. The charter specified that no more than 100 acres (400,000 m^{2}) could be held by the association, and at least 30 acres (120,000 m^{2}) must be used as a cemetery. The congressional charter also provided that no streets could be built through the cemetery. Congress specifically exempted all cemetery land (but not unimproved land) from taxes.

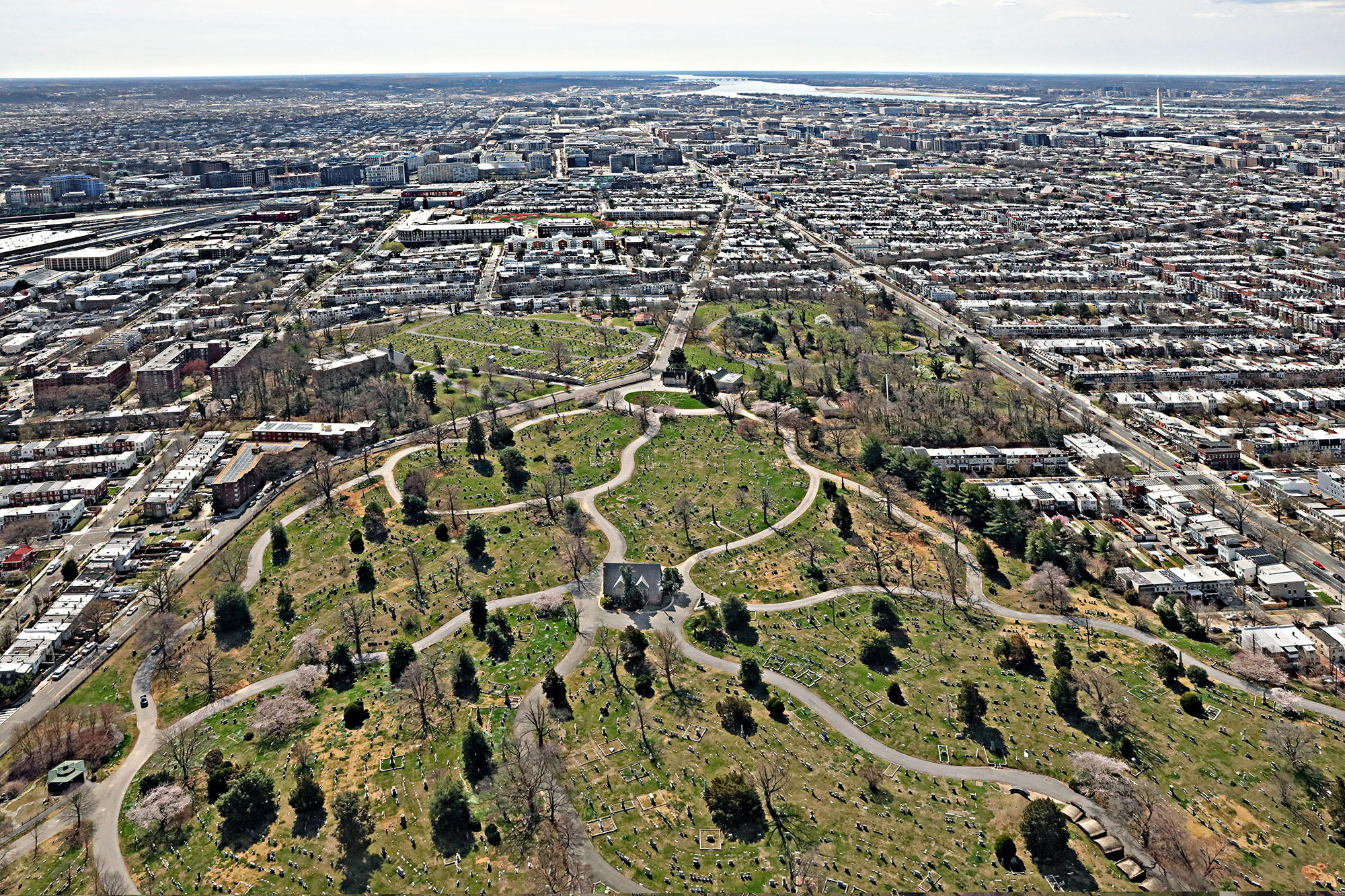
Glenwood Cemetery looking south

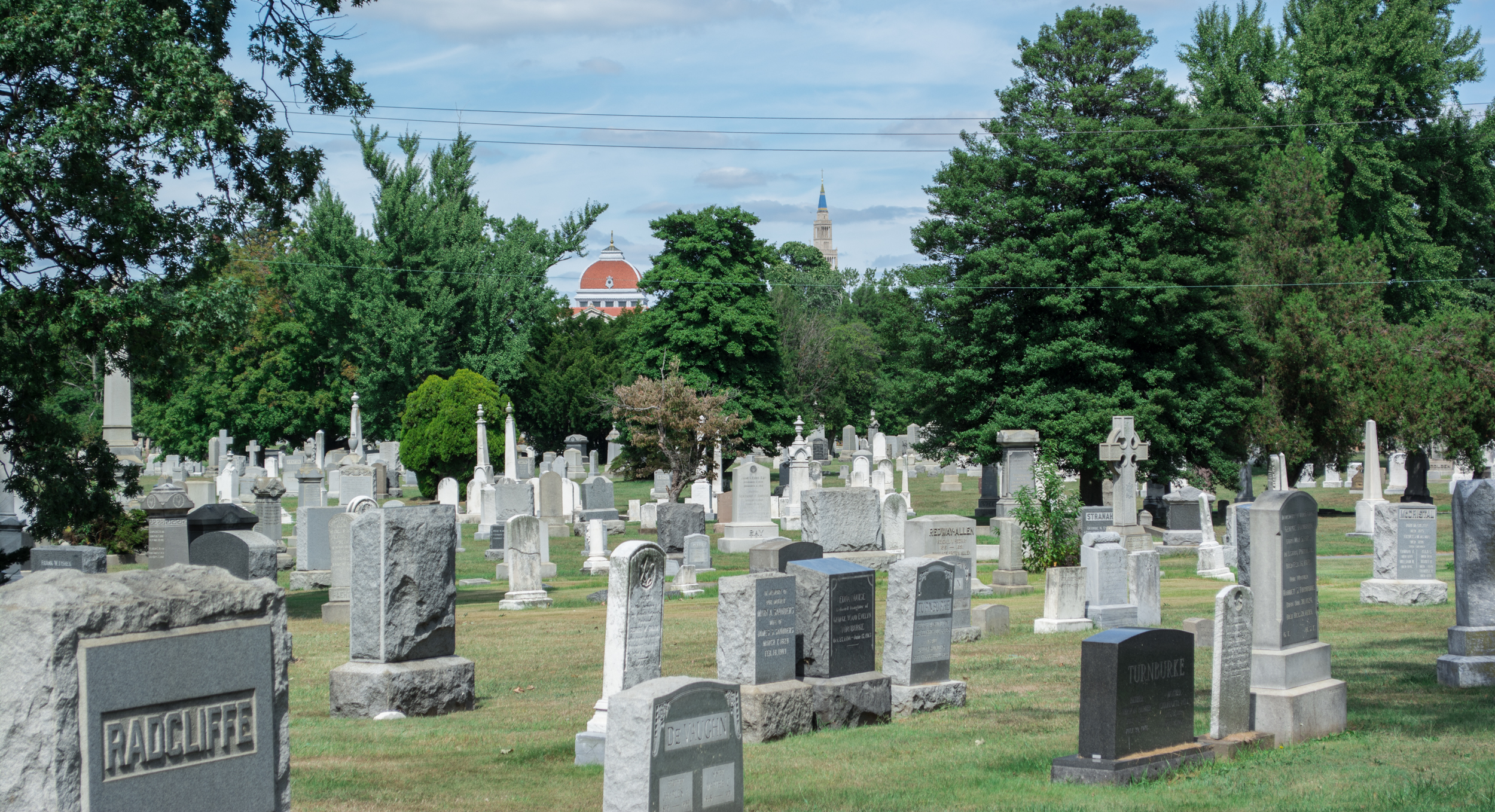
Looking north across Section D

Glenwood Cemetery was dedicated on August 2, 1854. In 1859, Humphreys defaulted on his payments to Close, forfeiting his right to receive any property. Close became the sole owner of Glenwood Cemetery, with Clendenin continuing to act as superintendent. Between 1854 and 1874, 2,000 burial plots were sold. When the District of Columbia assessed property taxes on the 60 acres (240,000 m^{2}) of unimproved land, Close argued that the entire site was dedicated to cemetery use. The tax assessments were withdrawn.

On February 28, 1877, Congress passed legislation changing the name of the association to "The Glenwood Cemetery". The board of trustees was reduced to five. Three of the trustees were to be elected by individuals who had purchased burial plots, and two by agreement among the 12 investors in the cemetery. The new congressional charter required that 25 percent of the proceeds from the sale of lots should be paid to the original 12 investors, with the remainder being used to maintain the cemetery.

Close refused to recognize the legality of the new congressional charter. Close now argued that the 60 acres (240,000 m^{2}) of unimproved land was private, not cemetery, property. Further complicating matters, Close was engaged in a lengthy and bitter divorce proceeding. He had turned over to his wife all his stock and profits in Glenwood Cemetery. A D.C. district court ordered Close to turn over his interest in Glenwood Cemetery to the other investors, to be compensated for this investment, and to continue to receive 25 percent of the profits from the cemetery. Close appealed the ruling, asking to keep all 90 acres (360,000 m^{2}) of the property. Close's wife appealed as well, demanding that the property be turned over to her.

The dispute went to the Supreme Court of the United States. In Close v. Glenwood Cemetery, 107 U.S. 466 (1883), the Supreme Court held that Close's wife had not filed her claim in a timely fashion and was not entitled to appeal. The Supreme Court also affirmed the judgment of the district court. The Glenwood Cemetery now passed solely into the hands of the remaining 11 investors.

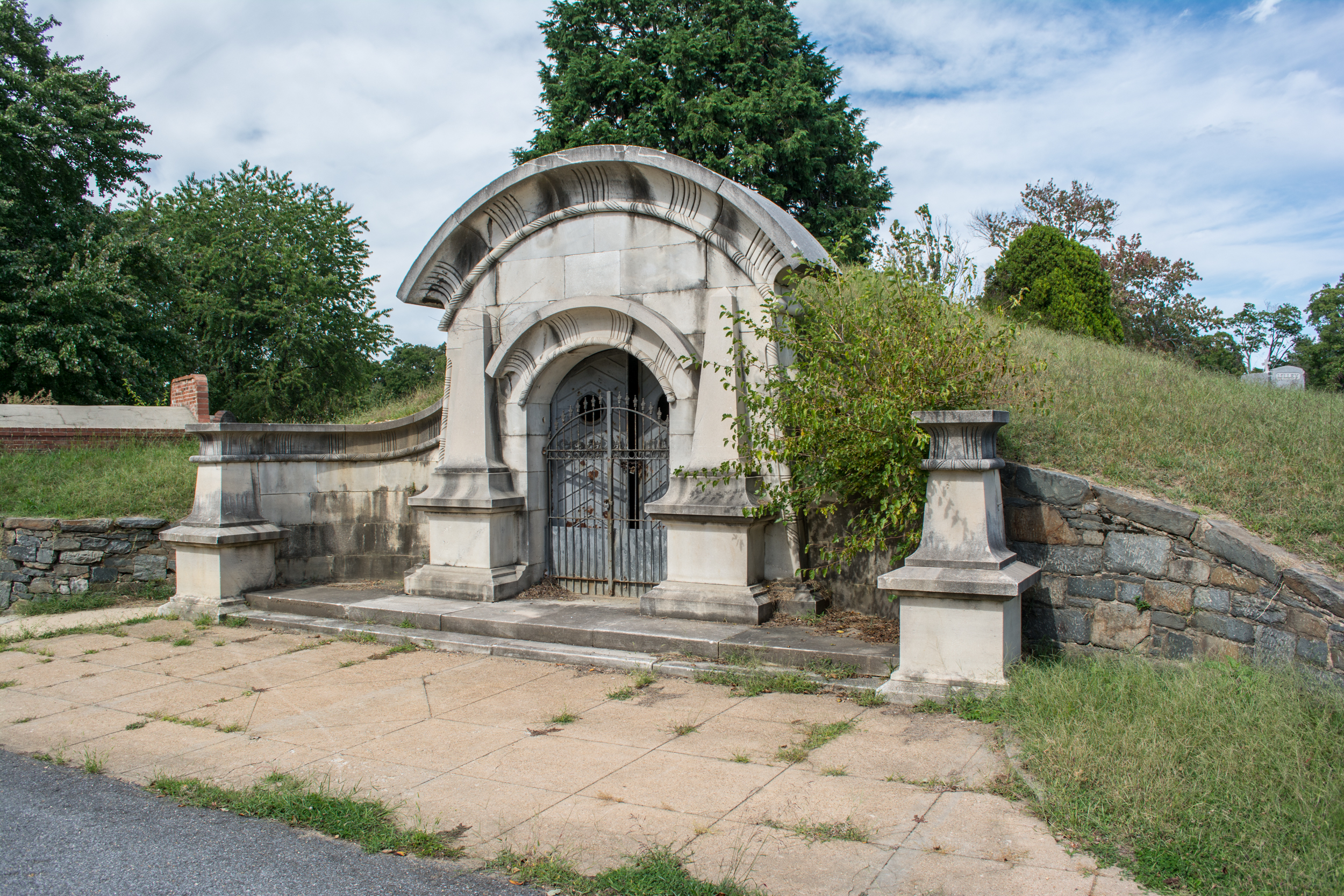
Former receiving vault at Glenwood Cemetery

As Glenwood Cemetery began to fill, the unimproved grounds were developed. The layout for Glenwood Cemetery was designed by George F. de la Roche, a civil engineer. De la Roche drew primary inspiration for Glenwood from Green-Wood Cemetery in Brooklyn, New York. But Mount Auburn Cemetery in Boston, Massachusetts, and Laurel Hill Cemetery in Philadelphia, Pennsylvania, were also important to the design. The cemetery hired de la Roche because he proposed a "rural cemetery" landscape design. De la Roche designed a series of winding roadways that followed the topography. A portion of the grounds remained undeveloped by the time the American Civil War broke out.

In November 1861, Abraham Lincoln visited Glenwood Cemetery to visit Colonel John Cochrane's First United States Chasseurs (65th New York Regiment). The Lincoln connection to Glenwood Cemetery continued after Lincoln's death, when assassination co-conspirator George Atzerodt was buried in Glenwood.

=== 19th and 20th centuries ===
During the late 19th and early 20th centuries, Glenwood Cemetery was known as one of the "big five" cemeteries in Washington, D.C.

In August 1892, Glenwood Cemetery commissioned a mortuary chapel from noted local architect Glenn Brown. Brown's Romanesque Revival structure was his only religious structure, and was completed at the height of his professional career. The Glenwood Cemetery Mortuary Chapel was added to the National Register of Historic Places in 1988. A large number of nationally and locally important individuals were buried in Glenwood Cemetery during its history. Among these were Benjamin Greenup (also spelled Grenup), a D.C. firefighter who was killed on May 6, 1856. For 150 years, Greenup was believed to be the first D.C. firefighter to die in the line of duty. A major memorial was erected over Greenup's burial site, and every year rookie firefighters drove a fire engine onto the grounds of Glenwood Cemetery to honor his memory. But in 2011, researchers discovered that D.C. firefighter John G. Anderson died in the line of duty on March 11, 1856—two months before Greenup. It remained unclear if the Greenup pilgrimage would continue. Another important figure buried at the cemetery was Constantino Brumidi, who painted the frescos in the United States Capitol. When Brumidi was buried, his grave was unmarked. The location of Brumidi's grave was lost for 72 years. It was rediscovered, and on February 19, 1952, a marker was finally placed above it.

As of 1988, neither the cemetery nor its mortuary chapel had been significantly altered since the construction of the mortuary chapel in 1892.

=== 21st century ===
After high winds in 2008 toppled several trees, the cemetery managers at Glenwood invited chainsaw artist, Dayton Scoggins, to carve four of their fallen oak tree stumps into unusual wooden statues. One features a large dragon capturing a smaller dragon. Another is a saber tooth tiger with smaller animals at its feet. The final two are angels, one ascending to heaven and one with a chain. The images were inspired by Revelations chapter 20, verses 1–3:

And I saw an angel coming down out of heaven, having the key to the Abyss and holding in his hand a great chain. He seized the dragon, that ancient serpent, who is the devil, or Satan, and bound him for a thousand years. He threw him into the Abyss, and locked and sealed it over him, to keep him from deceiving the nations anymore until the thousand years were ended.

== Notable interments ==
- Edgar Allan (1842–1904), Virginia state senator
- Margaret Amidon (1827–1869), school principal in Washington, D.C.
- George Atzerodt (1835–1865), conspirator in the assassination of Abraham Lincoln
- Ernest C. Bairstow (1876–1962), Anglo-American architectural sculptor known for his work on the Lincoln Memorial
- Thomas W. Bartley (1812–1885), Governor of Ohio and Justice on the Ohio State Supreme Court
- Clifford K. Berryman (1869–1949), editorial cartoonist who first drew the Teddy Bear
- Rebecca Wright Bonsal (1838–1914), Civil War heroine and early female civil servant
- William Henry Boyd (1825–1887), Colonel in the Union Army, publisher of Boyd's City Directories
- William A. Bradley (1794–1867), Mayor of Washington, D.C.
- Constantino Brumidi (1805–1880), painter of frescos in the United States Capitol
- John Simpson Crocker (1820–1890), Brigadier General in the Union Army
- Chester Bidwell Darrall (1842–1908), U.S. Representative from Louisiana
- Frederic De Frouville (c. 1850–1883), notorious murderer
- A. Lawrence Foster (1802–1877), a U.S. Representative from New York State
- William E. Gaines (1844–1912), a U.S. Representative from Virginia
- Alexander Gardner (1821–1882), Scottish American Civil War photographer
- Selucius Garfielde (1822–1883), a Territorial Delegate to Congress from Washington Territory
- Louis Gathmann (1843–1917), inventor and engineer
- Ransom H. Gillet (1800–1876), U.S. Representative from New York
- Howard Helmick (1844–1907) American painter, etcher, designer, and illustrator
- Gretchen Hood (1886–1978), American opera singer
- Irwin "Ike" H. Hoover (1871–1933), Chief White House Usher for many years
- Elizabeth Orpha Sampson Hoyt (1828–1912), philosopher, author, lecturer
- Amos Kendall (1789–1869), U.S. Postmaster General and founder of school for the deaf which became Gallaudet University
- Edwin F. Ladd (1859–1925), president of North Dakota Agricultural College and a U.S. Senator from North Dakota
- Emanuel Leutze (1816–1868), painter of Washington Crossing the Delaware
- Ralph P. Lowe (1805–1883), Governor of Iowa and Justice of the Iowa Supreme Court
- Albert Gallatin Mackey (1807–1881), physician and primary founder of Scottish Rite Freemasonry
- Edmund William McGregor Mackey (1846–1884), U.S. Representative from South Carolina
- Van H. Manning (1839–1892), Colonel in the Confederate States Army and U.S. Representative from Mississippi
- John Luckey McCreery (1835–1906), poet best known for the work There Is No Death, which first appeared in July 1863
- Clark Mills (1810–1883), American sculptor
- John Frederick Parker (1830–1890), D.C. police officer assigned to guard Abraham Lincoln the night the president was killed
- Alexander G. Penn (1799–1866), a U.S. Representative from Louisiana
- Bertha E. Perrie (1868–1921), painter
- Daniel Reintzel (1755–1828), three-term mayor of the town of Georgetown, D.C.
- Marcus Reno (1834–1889), survivor of the Battle of Little Big Horn, removed and reburied at Custer National Cemetery
- John J. Roane (1794–1869), U.S. Representative from Virginia
- John Ambler Smith (1847–1892), U.S. Representative from Virginia
- Len Spencer (1867–1914), singer and composer, popular recording artist from the 1890s to the 1910s
- Strong John Thomson (1819–1897), Washington, D.C., educator and founder of the Thomson School
- John Tyssowski (1811–1857), Dictator of the Republic of Kraków, Poland, amid the fizzled 1846 uprising
- Hiram Walbridge (1821–1870), U.S. Representative from New York
- Dr. Tobias Watkins (1780–1855), fourth auditor of the United States Treasury, writer, editor, and physician
- Jesse Johnson Yeates (1829–1892), U.S. Representative from North Carolina
- James R. Young (1847–1924), U.S. Representative from Pennsylvania
- John Russell Young (1882–1966), Longest serving President of the Board of Commissioners of the District of Columbia

== Notable monuments and buildings ==
- Blundon Monument
- Glenwood Cemetery Mortuary Chapel
- Grenup Monument
- Vasco Monument

== Bibliography ==
- Bradley, Charles S. "The Bradley Family and the Times in Which They Lived." Records of the Columbia Historical Society. 1903, pp. 123–142.
- Bryan, Wilhelmus B. A History of the National Capital: From Its Foundation Through the Period of the Adoption of the Organic Act. New York: Macmillan, 1916.
- Clark, Allen C. "Abraham Lincoln in the National Capital." Records of the Columbia Historical Society. 27 (1925), pp. 1–174.
- Clark, Elizabeth G. "Report of the Chronicler for 1952." Records of the Columbia Historical Society. 51/52 (1951–1952), pp. 181–209.
- Richardson, Steven J. "The Burial Grounds of Black Washington: 1880–1919." Records of the Columbia Historical Society. 52 (1989), pp. 304–326.
