= Glenn Brown (architect) =

American architect and historian (1854–1932)

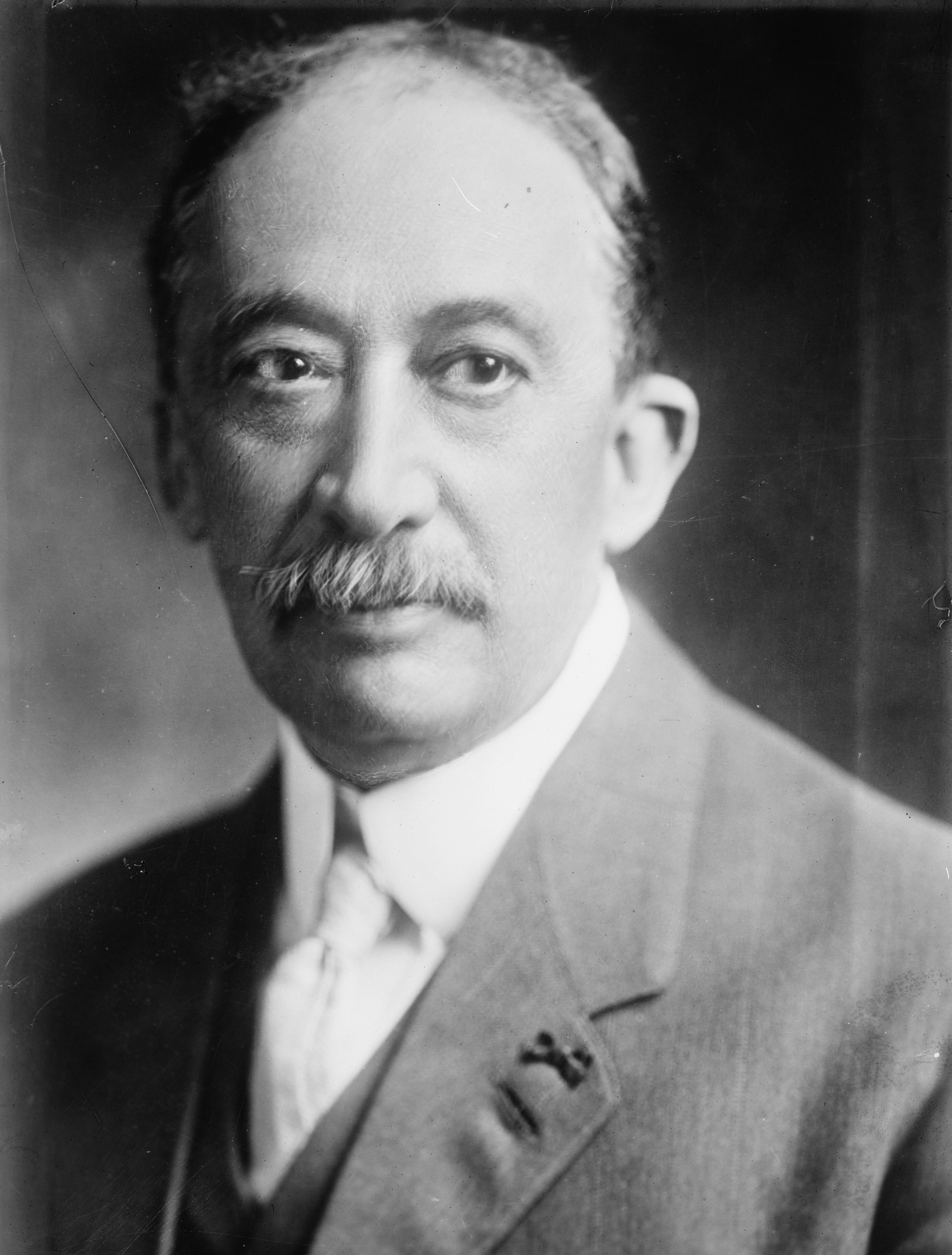
- Born: September 13, 1854; Fauquier County, Virginia, U.S.
- Died: April 22, 1932 (aged 77); Newport News, Virginia, U.S.
- Resting place: Rock Creek Cemetery
- Education: Washington and Lee University; Massachusetts Institute of Technology; George Washington University (MA)
- Occupations: Architect; historian
- Spouse: Mary Ella Chapman (m. 1876)
- Children: 2
- Relatives: Bedford Brown (grandfather)

Glenn Brown (September 13, 1854 – April 22, 1932) was an American architect and historian.

== Early life ==
Glenn Brown was born on September 13, 1854, in Fauquier County, Virginia, to Mary E. Simpson and Bedford Brown Jr. His grandfather was U.S. senator Bedford Brown. In 1855, the family moved to a plantation in Caswell County, North Carolina. He lived there until after the Civil War when the family moved to Alexandria, Virginia. He studied the classics at Washington and Lee University. He then studied medicine under his father. He learned mechanical drafting and patent drawing to earn extra money. By 1873, he was learning architecture in the office of Norris G. Starkweather. In 1875, he enrolled at the Massachusetts Institute of Technology and participated in a two-year concentrated architectural program. He attained a Master of Arts from George Washington University.

== Career ==
After Massachusetts Institute of Technology, Brown worked for the contracting firm Norcross Brothers that built from designs by architect Henry Hobson Richardson. He then worked as a clerk of the works for the Cheney Building in Hartford, Connecticut. In 1879, he moved to Washington, D.C., and worked for the government. He had an architectural firm with his son called Glenn Brown & Bedford Brown. He planned a few buildings in North Carolina early in his career, including thee two-story house of W. B. Carter called W. B. Carter House and collaborating with his cousin Willis E. Hall in designing the First National Bank of Winston and the Winston Town Hall in the Romanesque Revival style. He later worked as an architect for the U.S. Marines in Quantico from 1921 to 1924.

He wrote a two-volume History of the United States Capitol (1901 and 1904) and more than 100 articles. He also wrote "The Octagon", "Folio" and "Memories of Thirty Years". In 1899, he became secretary-treasurer of the American Institute of Architects. He served in that role until 1913 and advocated for the beautification of Washington, D.C. He supported the L'Enfant Plan for the city. During his tenure, the institute relocated its headquarters to the Octagon in Washington, D.C., developed the institute's national archive and library, and published the organization's first journal. He was an officer of the Federation of Arts and was an organizer of the Public Art League of America.

In 1927, Brown was elected into the National Academy of Design as an associate member. He was elected as a corresponding member of the Royal Institute of Architects of Great Britain, the Societe Central des Architects Francais the Societe d'Architects Belgiques, and the American Academy at Rome. He was a member of the Washington Society of Arts and Letters, the National Academy of Design and the Cosmos Club. He was a member of the purchasing committee of Avery Library at Columbia University.

== Works ==
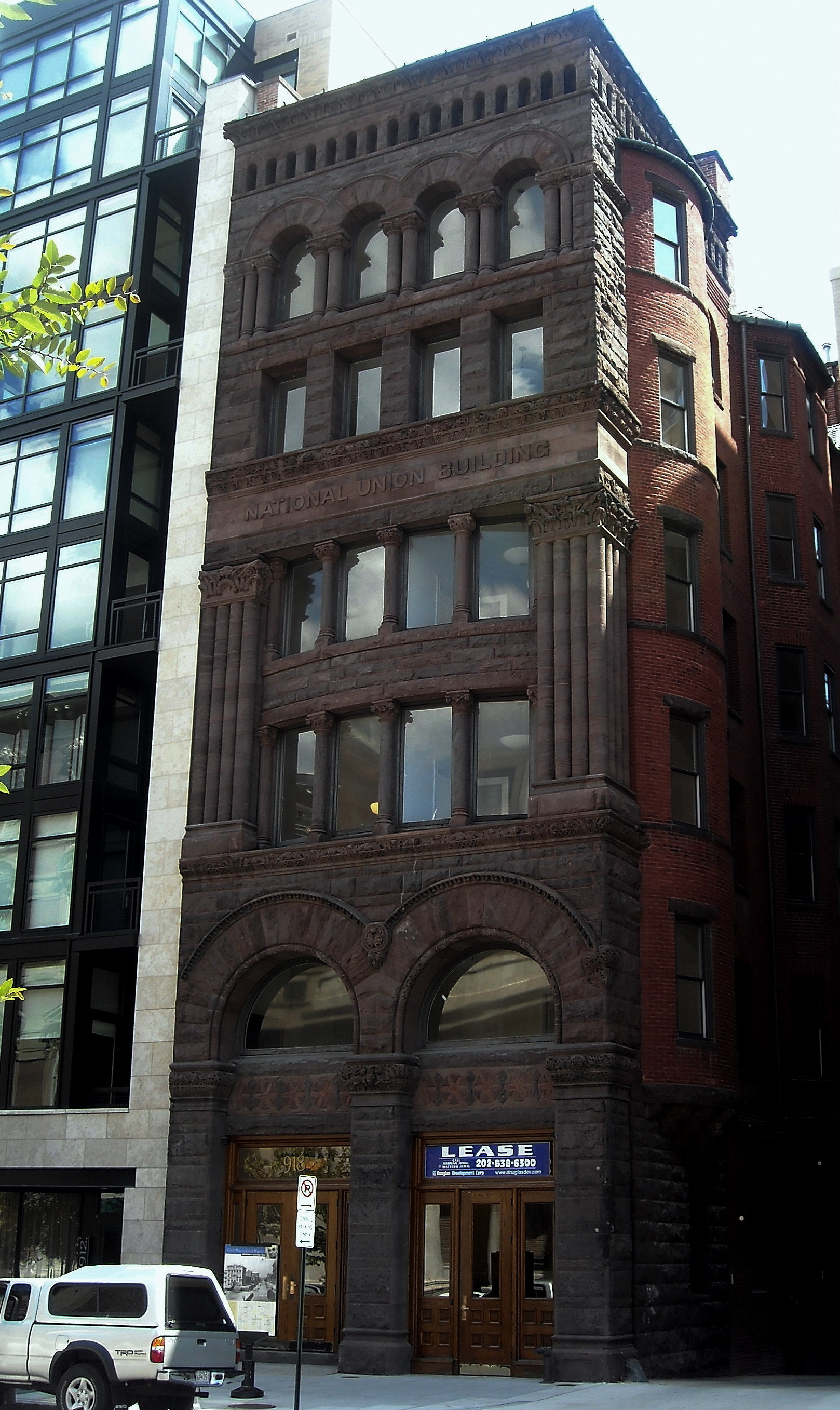
National Union Building

Several of his works are listed on the U.S. National Register of Historic Places.

His works included:

- National Insurance Building, F Street, Washington, D.C. (1890)
- Joseph Beale House, 2301 Massachusetts Ave., NW., Washington, D.C. (Brown, Glenn), NRHP-listed
- Dumbarton Bridge, Q St. over Rock Creek Park, NW., Washington, D.C. (Brown, Glenn & Bedford), NRHP-listed
- Alfred Nobel Memorial (Brown, Glenn & Bedford)
- Glenwood Cemetery Mortuary Chapel, 2219 Lincoln Rd., NE, Washington, D.C. (Brown, Glenn), NRHP-listed
- National Union Building, 918 F St., NW, Washington, D.C. (Brown, Glenn), NRHP-listed
- One or more works in Fourteenth Street Historic District, roughly bounded by S, 12th, N and 15th Sts., NW., Washington, D.C. (Brown, Glenn, et al.), NRHP-listed
- Renovation of Gunston Hall
- Renovation of Pohick Church

== Personal life ==
Brown married Mary Ella Chapman of Virginia on February 1, 1876. He had two sons, Bedford and Glenn Madison. He lived on I Street in Washington, D.C.

Brown died on April 22, 1932, at Elizabeth Buxton Hospital in Newport News, Virginia. He was buried in Rock Creek Cemetery.
