= Benjamin C. Grenup Monument =

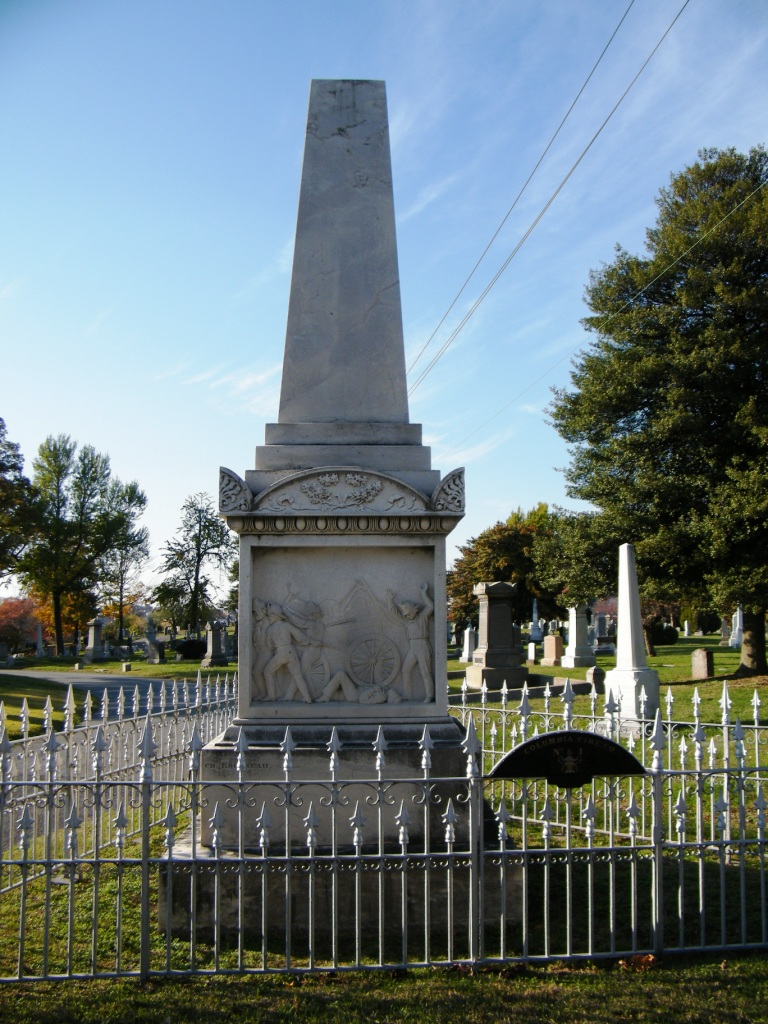
- Artist: Charles Rousseau (sculptor)
- Year: 1858
- Type: Marble
- Location: Washington, D.C.; 38°55′20″N 77°0′23″W
- Owner: Glenwood Cemetery

The Benjamin C. Grenup Monument is a public artwork by American artist Charles Rousseau, located at Glenwood Cemetery in Washington, D.C., United States. "Benjamin C. Grenup Monument" serves as the final resting place for firefighter Benjamin Grenup.

== Description ==
This marble obelisk is on top of a square base with three reliefs on it. The south side of the base has a relief of Benjamin Grenup at the time of his death. The relief shows Grenup being run over by a fire water wagon and his fellow firefighters reacting to the accidental death—one has his arms in the air while the other firefighters stop the wagon. The west side of the base has a relief of a fire hose and two nozzles. The east side has a relief of a fire axe, torch and spanner wrench tied together with a rope. Egg-and-dart motif along with garland and ribbons decorate the sculpture. The sculpture sits on a triangle plot surrounded by a fence. Fire hydrants sit at each of the three corners of the base.

The sculpture is signed on the base, south side: CH. ROUSSEAU. Sculptor.

The west side of the base is inscribed:

Monument
Committee.
C Kauffman.
W.P. Hicks.
P. Kraft.

The north side of the base is inscribed: BENJAMIN C. GRENUP

AGED 24 YEARS
KILLED IN THE DISCHARGE OF HIS DUTY
MAY 6: 1856
THIS MONUMENT IS ERECTED
BY
COLUMBIA ENGINE CO NO 1
TO PERPETUATE THE MEMORY AND NOBLE DEEDS
OF A
GALLANT FIREMAN
A TRUER NOBLER TRUSTIER HEART
MORE LOVING OR MORE LOYAL NEVER BEAT
WITHIN A HUMAN BREAST

The fence gate has signage reading:

COLUMBIA, FIRE, CO.
NO 1
J. H. MEAD, - MAKER.
C. St, BETWEEN 9 & 10 Sts
Washington.

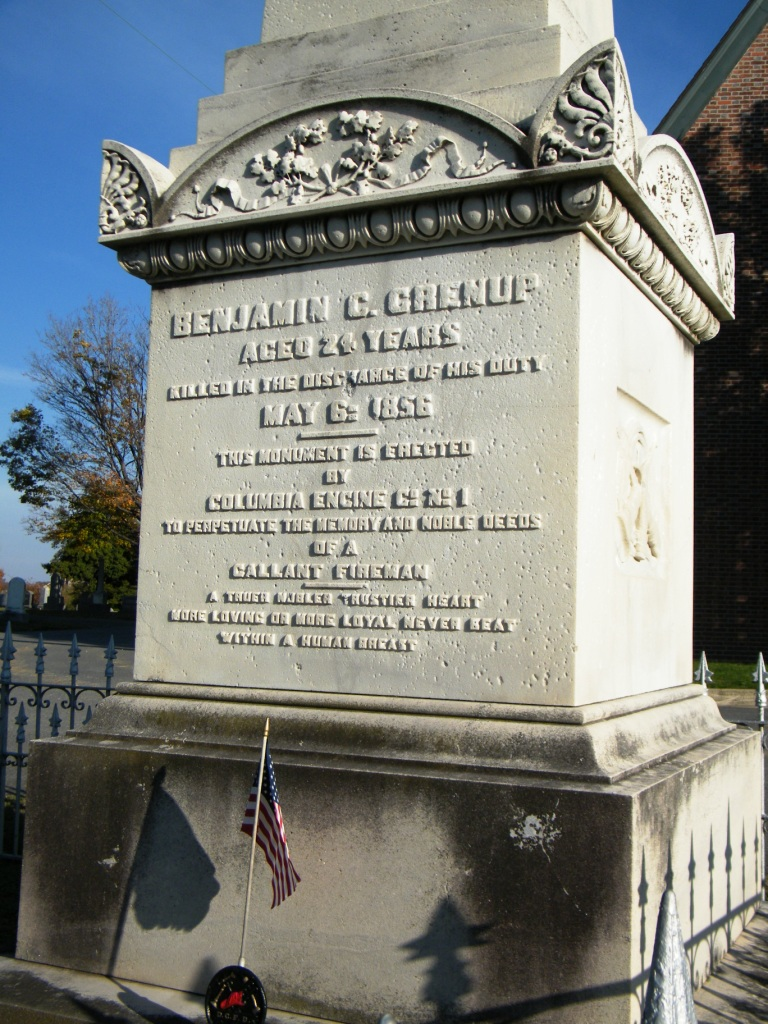
Front

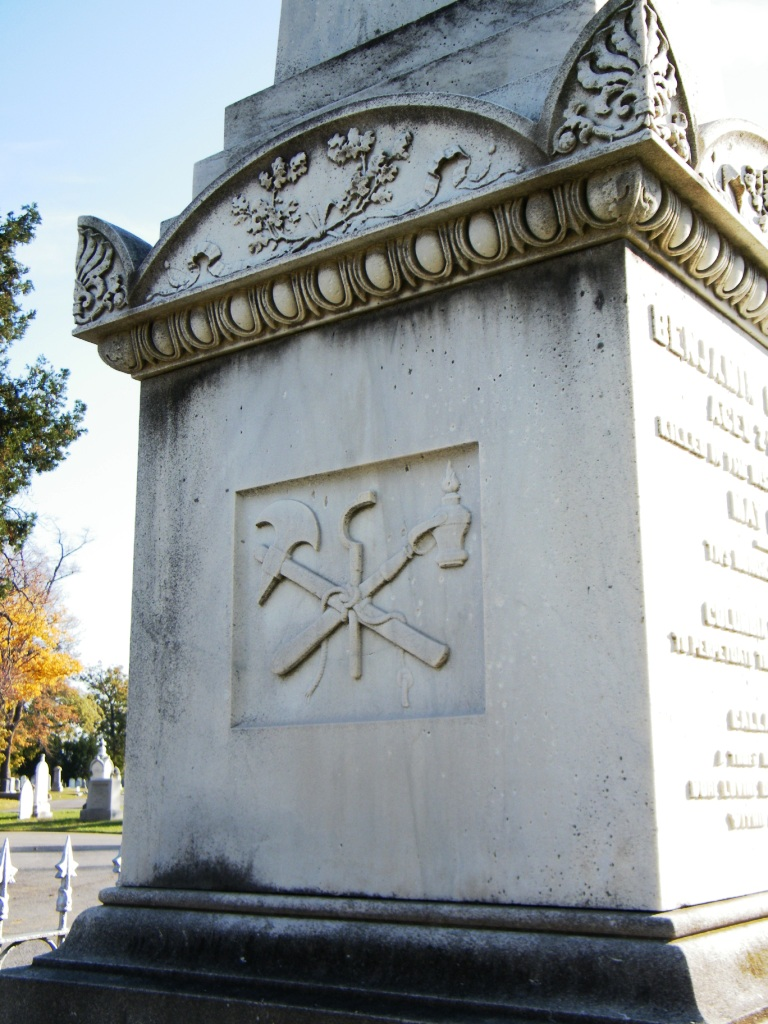
Proper left

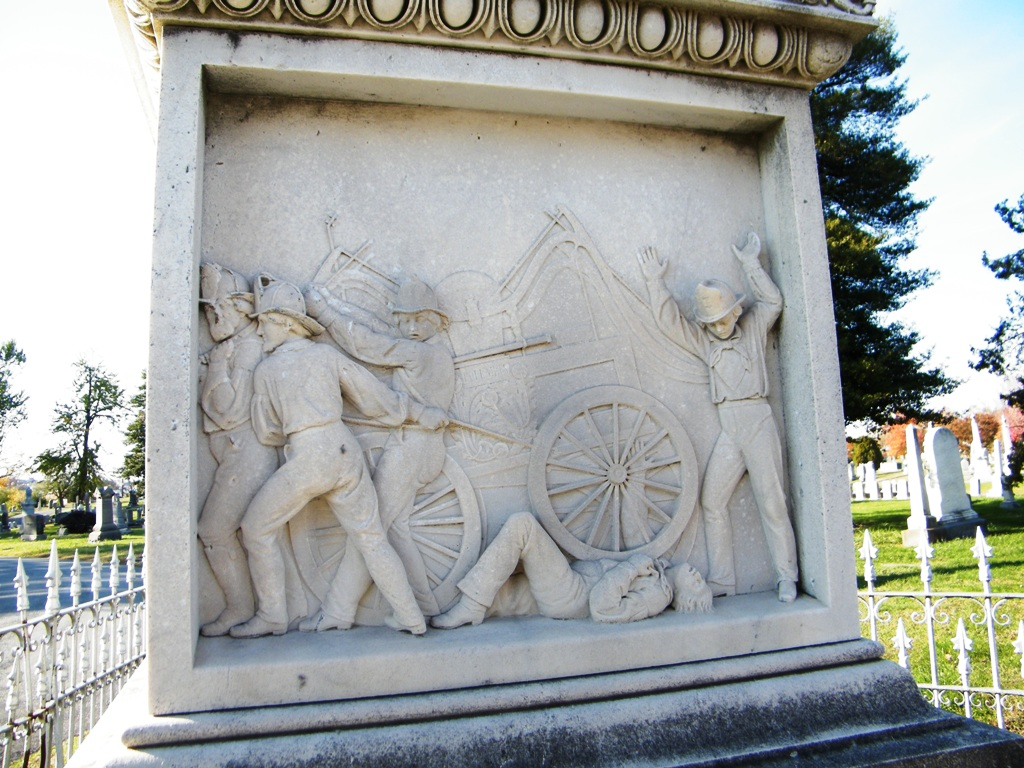
Back relief

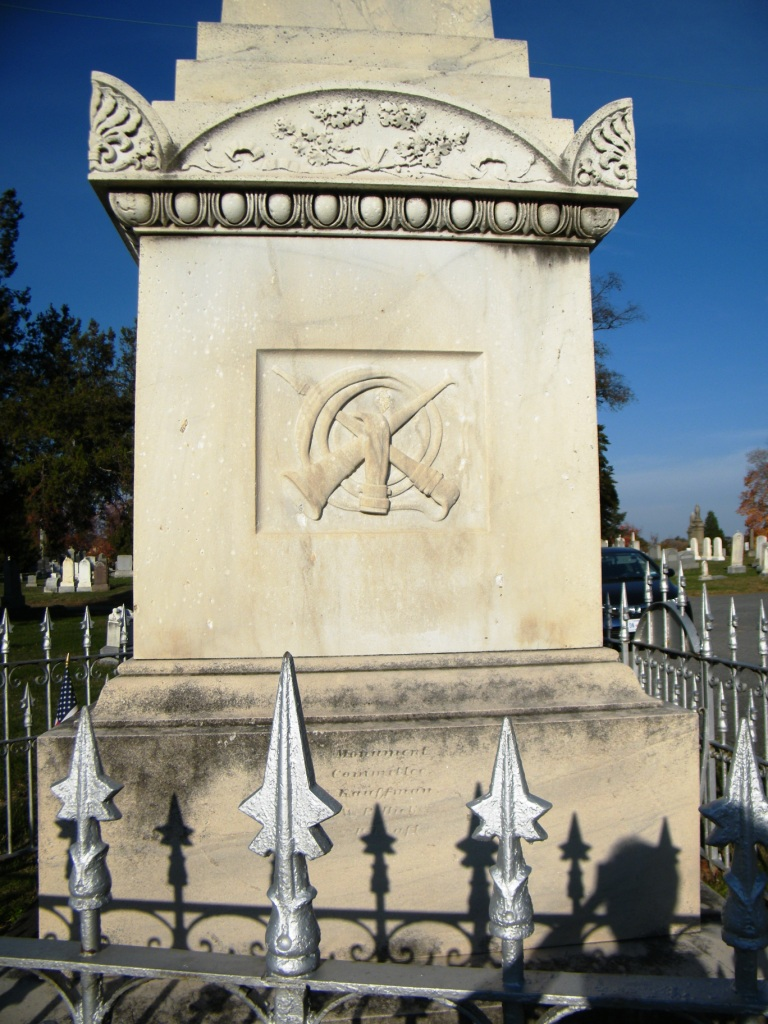
Proper right

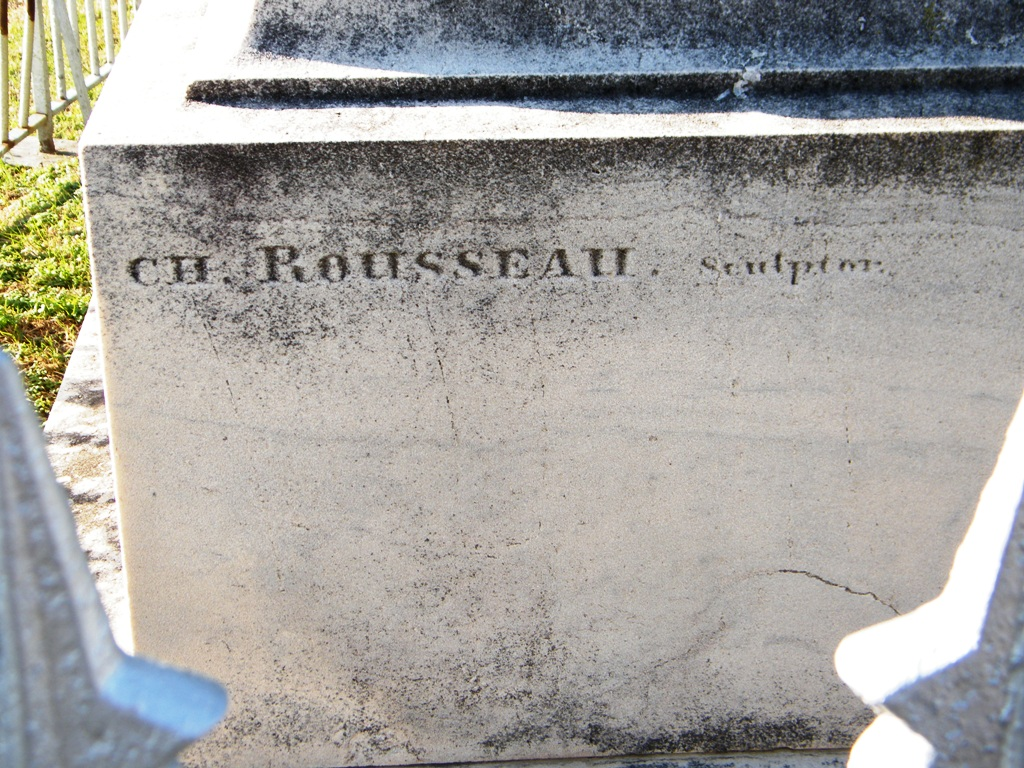
Signature

== Artist ==
Charles Rousseau (d. Washington, D.C. 1903) may have been born in Belgium and lived in Washington DC and designed many monuments and gravestones in the area including Congressional Cemetery. He may have received his education at the Royal Academies for Science and the Arts of Belgium. Very little documentation exists of his background.

== Information ==
Benjamin Grenup was one of the first firefighters killed in action in Washington, D.C. On May 6, 1856, the volunteer fireman was running with a hand engine, while pulling the engine he was run over en route to a call at Shreeve's Stable on 7th Street, NW. Grenup was part of Columbia Fire Company #1, now known as DCFD Engine Company #3.

== See also ==
- List of public art in Washington, D.C.
