= Victor S. Blundon Monument =

Artwork in Glenwood Cemetery, Washington, DC

- Artist: Unknown
- Year: 1936
- Type: Granite
- Dimensions: 150 cm × 210 cm × 30 cm (60 in × 84 in × 12 in)
- Location: Washington, D.C., United States; 38°55′28.57″N 77°0′22.86″W
- Owner: Glenwood Cemetery

The Victor S. Blundon Monument is a 1936 public artwork by an unknown artist, located at Glenwood Cemetery in Washington, D.C., United States. "Victor S. Blundon Monument" was surveyed as part of the Smithsonian Save Outdoor Sculpture! survey in 1994. It serves as the final resting place for the Blundon family.

== Description ==
This gravestone's focal point is a relief portrait of Victor S. Blundon sitting cross-legged on the ground next to his dog. Blundon wears a suit and tie and his left arm rests upon his left knee. His right arm is around his dog which sits next to him on his right.

The sculpture is inscribed in the front center:

VICTOR
BLUNDON

The proper left side of the relief is inscribed:

CAROLINE.A.HYAM
1874–1959
BESSIE.C.BEHRENS
1884–1956
CHARLES.A.SCHNEBEL
1846–1908
EMMA.A.SCHNEBEL
1856–1912

The proper right side of the relief is inscribed:

FRANCIS.A.BLUNDON
1867–1939
MARY.C.BLUNDON
1873–1941
VICTOR.S.BLUNDON
1896–1936
F.EDWARD BLUNDON
1894–1938

The back proper left side of the grave is inscribed:

ROBERT.B.BLUNDON
1869–1936
S.BEULAH.FINDLEY
1871–1939
GERTRUDE.W.BLUNDON
WIFE OF
ROBERT BROOKE
1885–1969

The back proper right side of the grave is inscribed:

MINNIE.A.ASQUITH
1881–1920

The center back of the grave is inscribed: BLUNDON

== Gallery ==
Proper Front

== Information ==
Charles Schnebel and his wife, Emma, were born in Prussia and owned a restaurant in Washington. They were the parents of Caroline Hyam and Mary Blundon.

Frances Blundon was born in Loudoun County, Virginia on April 14, 1867. His training as an apprentice and journeyman carpenter prepared him for a career in home building. Working as an independent builder starting in 1892 his company built approximately 700 homes in D.C. during the first ten years of his career. He often worked alongside his brother, Joseph, who lived with other members of the Blundon family in their Georgetown home. On January 5, 1893 he married Mary Schnebel (born in Virginia, August, 1873) and they gave birth to two sons: Francis Edward and Victor Sylvester. Both eventually became salesmen for the elder Blundon's company.

Frances Blundon built many houses in the D.C. area, primarily in the Northwest area of Washington in areas such as Bloomingdale. His brother, Robert Blundon, also worked in real estate sales, who lived with the family in the early 1900s. In their home in the 100 block of W Street, NW, they had a live-in African-American chauffeur named Frank Payner and an African-American live-in cook named Hattie Clement. This house is now owned by the Soul Saving Center Church of God. Frances Blundon's early career was with a construction firm with two other men called Blundon, O'Brian & Belt, Inc. Located at 1220 G. Street, NW, they specialized in real estate, insurance and loans.

Frances and Mary frequented steamship vacations traveling to locations such as Bermuda in 1926. Eventually, the family moved (along with their two unmarried sons) to a 50-acre farm on Georgia Avenue in Forest Glen, Maryland in 1918 and continued to live there into the 1930s. The farm sat on property once in the Getty family. This grave depicts Victor Blundon with his beloved Irish Setter.

== Condition ==
This sculpture was surveyed in 1994 for its condition and it was described as "well maintained."

== See also ==
- List of public art in Washington, D.C.
