= Maxwell Van Zandt Woodhull =

American soldier

Max Van Zandt Woodhull
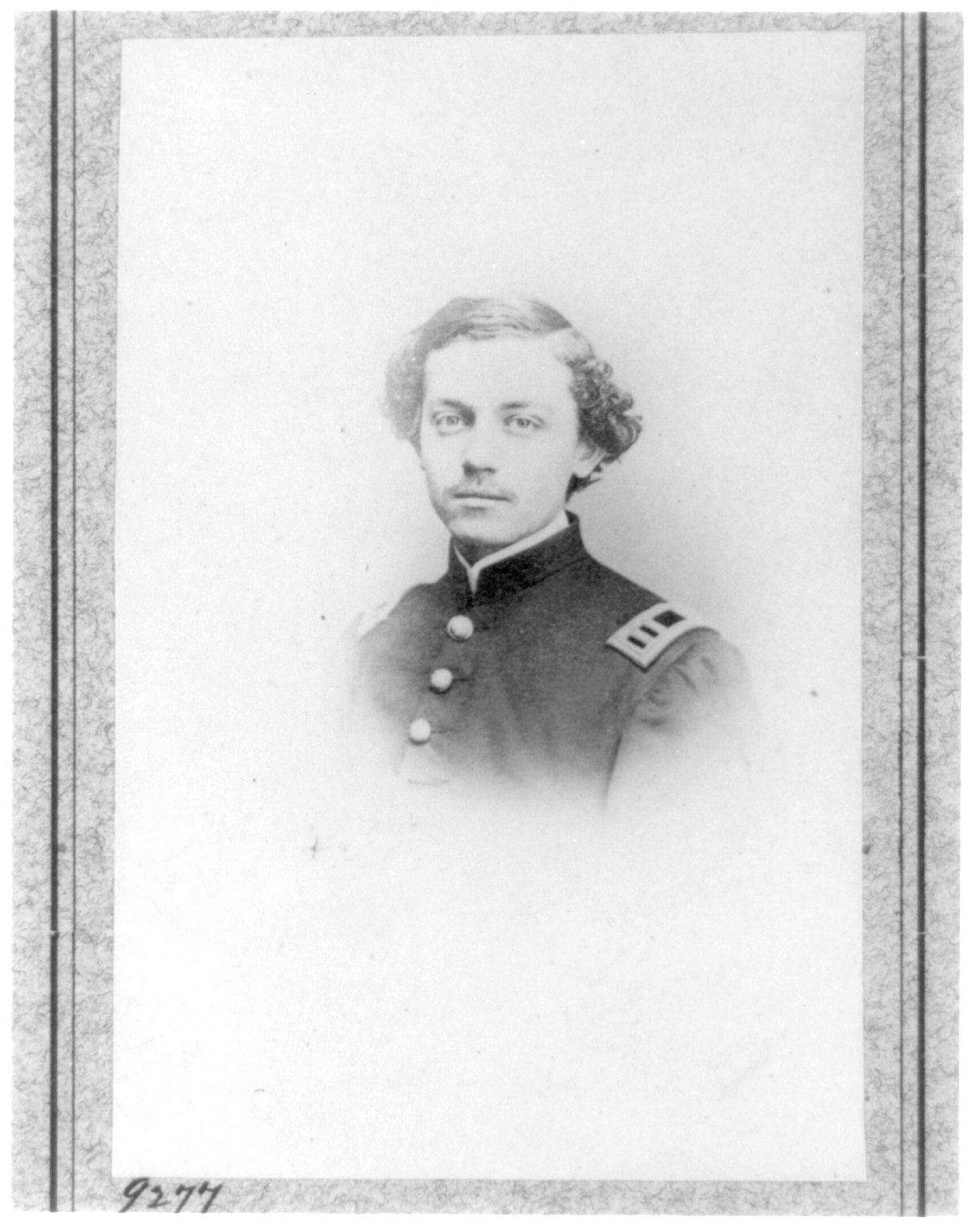
- Maxwell Van Zandt Woodhull in 1865
- Born: September 17, 1843; Washington, D.C., U.S.
- Died: July 25, 1921 (aged 77); Washington, D.C., U.S.
- Education: Miami University; Columbian Law School
- Military career
- Branch: Union Army
- Rank: Brevet Brigadier General
- Conflicts: American Civil War

Maxwell Van Zandt Woodhull (September 17, 1843 – July 25, 1921) was a Union Army officer during the American Civil War.

== Biography ==
Coat of Arms of Maxwell Woodhull

Woodhull was born in Washington, D.C., on September 17, 1843. He was the son of United States Navy officer Maxwell Woodhull who commanded the USS Cimarron and died from an accidental gun discharge during the Civil War. He was a graduate of Miami University and Columbian Law School. He was a lawyer before and after the Civil War.

Woodhull enlisted as a private on December 22, 1862. He was appointed captain and aide-de-camp to Major General Robert C. Schenck on March 11, 1863. He was appointed aide-de-camp to Major General Lew Wallace on March 12, 1864. He was appointed major and Assistant Adjutant General on June 30, 1864. He was appointed lieutenant colonel and Assistant Adjutant General of the XV Corps (Union Army), Army of the Tennessee, from February 17, 1865, to August 1, 1865. He later was appointed brevet colonel of volunteers, to rank from March 13, 1865.

On February 22, 1866, President Andrew Johnson nominated Woodhull for appointment to the grade of brevet brigadier general of volunteers, to rank from March 13, 1865, and the United States Senate confirmed the appointment on April 10, 1866. Woodhulll was mustered out of the volunteers on May 31, 1866.

Woodhull wrote West Point in Our Next War: The Only Way to Create and Maintain an Army (1915). Woodull was largely responsible for bringing George Washington University to its present location.

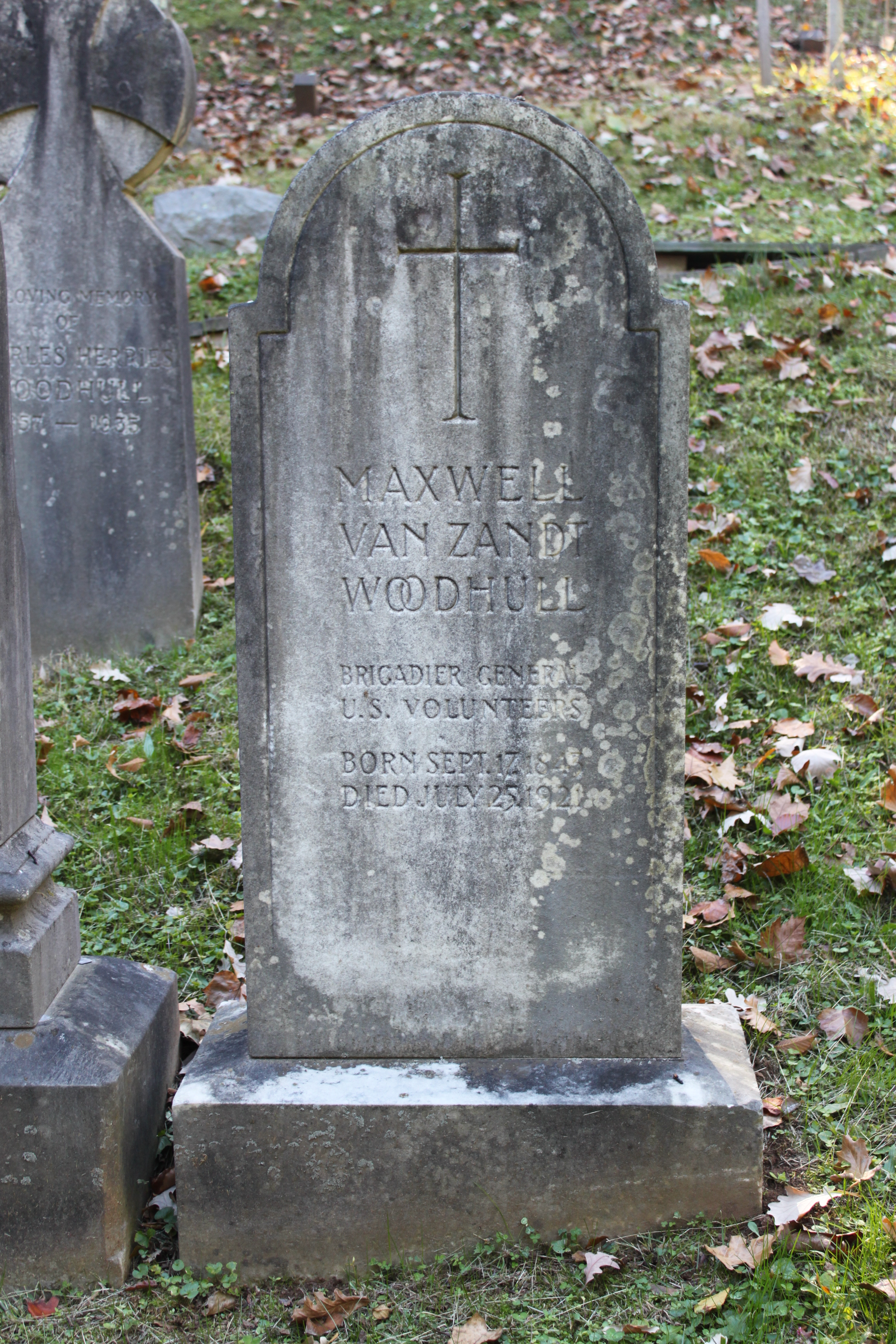
Grave of Woodhull at Oak Hill Cemetery

Maxwell Van Zandt Woodhull died July 25, 1921, at Washington, District of Columbia. He is buried at Oak Hill Cemetery (Washington, D.C.).
