= Margaret L. Bailey =

American newspaper publisher and poet (1812–1888)

- Born: Margaret Lucy Shands; December 12, 1812; Sussex County, Virginia, US
- Died: 1888 (aged 75–76)
- Resting place: Oak Hill Cemetery, Washington, D.C.
- Occupations: writer, poet, lyricist; newspaper editor, publisher
- Spouse: Gamaliel Bailey (m. 1833)
- Children: 12
- Writing career
- Subject: abolition

Margaret L. Bailey (née , Shands; December 12, 1812 – 1888) was an American anti-slavery writer, poet, lyricist, as well as newspaper editor and publisher. She served as editor of The Youth's Monthly Visitor, a children's magazine, and as the publisher of The National Era, an anti-slavery journal.

== Biography ==
Margaret Lucy Shands was born in Sussex County, Virginia, on December 12, 1812. She was a daughter of Thomas Shands. When she was about six years old, her family removed to Ohio, and settled in the vicinity of Cincinnati.

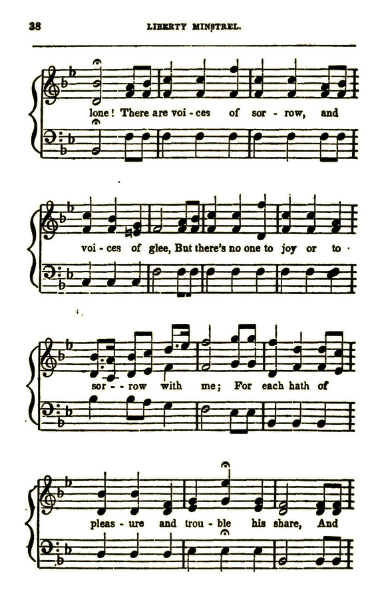
"The Blind Slave Boy" (1845). Words by Mrs. Dr. Bailey. Music arranged from Sweet Afton.

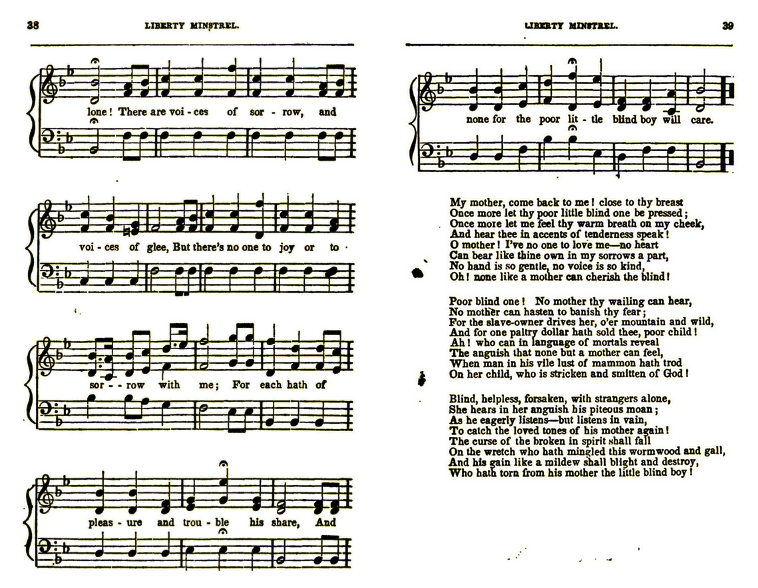
"The Blind Slave Boy", pp. 2-3

In 1833, she married Dr. Gamaliel Bailey, a physician in Cincinnati. Of the Bailey's 12 children, only half survived infancy.

In 1837, Dr. Bailey became the editor and proprietor of The Philanthropist, a well-known anti-slavery journal, which was merged into The Cincinnati Morning Herald, in the year 1843. In March 1844, Mrs. Bailey became the editor of The Youth's Monthly Visitor, a quarto paper for children, which rapidly became popular and attained a circulation of 3,000 copies. The Baileys removed from Cincinnati to Washington, D.C. in late 1846, for the purpose of Mr. Bailey becoming the editor of The National Era in 1847. At the same time, Mrs. Bailey transferred the publication of The Youth's Monthly Visitor to Washington, D.C., and continued it until 1852. There, the family home became a gathering place for large circle of literary, political, and social friends, as well as white antislavery activists. Her weekend salons were frequented by writers and abolitionists.

After Dr. Bailey's death in 1859, Mrs. Bailey served as the publisher of The National Era until the time of its suspension, February, 1860. She removed to Baltimore, Maryland after the following year.

Her poems appeared in the journals edited by Mrs. Bailey and her husband, and there was no collected edition of them. For eight or ten years after her husband's death, she stopped writing poetry. Her poems, "Duty and Reward", "The Pauper Child's Burial", "Memories", and "Endurance" appear in Coggeshall's, The Poets and Poetry of the West: With Biographical and Critical Notices (1860) They also appear in Griswold & Stoddard's The Female Poets of America (1878), as does "Life's Changes".

Bailey died in 1888. She and her husband are buried at Oak Hill Cemetery in Georgetown.

== Critical reception ==
According to Griswold & Stoddard (1878), The Youth's Monthly Visitor "was perhaps the first of its class every published in the U.S., and its content justify the critical opinion of Mr. William D. Gallagher, that Mrs. Bailey is one of the ablest women of the age."

She did not like the poems of her early life, though Rufus Wilmot Griswold, stated, "They have less individuality than her prose, but they are informed with fancy and a just understanding.".

== Duty and Reward ==
LABOR—wait! thy Master perished
Ere his task was done;
Count not lost thy fleeting moments,
Life hath but begun.

Labor! and the seed thou sowest
Water with thy tears;
God is faithful—he will give thee
Answer to thy prayers.

Wait in hope! though yet no verdure
Glad the longing eyes,
Thou shalt see the ripened harvest
Garnered in the skies.

Labor — wait! though midnight shadows
Gather round thee here,
And the storms above thee lowering
Fill thy heart with fear-

Wait in hope; the morning dawneth
When the night is gone,
And a peaceful rest awaits thee
When thy work is done.

== Selected works ==
- "National era. : To the subscribers of the Era: When the National era was suspended, last March, I hoped that arrangements could be made to resume its publication on the 1st of May.", 1860
- "The National era, Washington, D.C. Volume XIV. January, 1860. : The National era is a political, literary, and family newspaper. It is an uncompromising opponent of slavery and the slave power ... it has supported and will continue to support the Republican Party, so long as it shall be true to freedom", 1860
