= Oak Hill Cemetery (Washington, D.C.) =

Historic cemetery in Washington D.C.

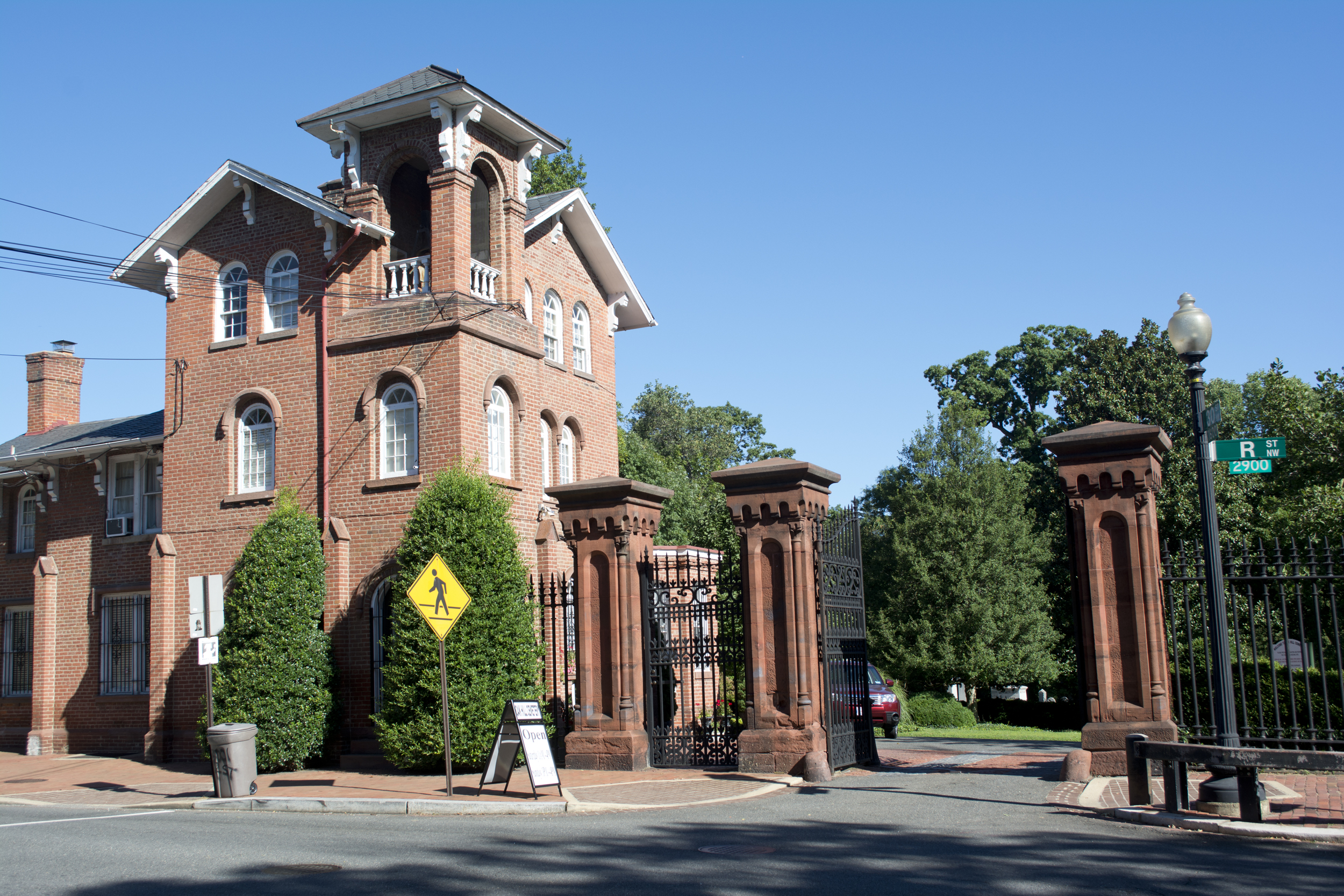
- Italianate gatehouse, Oak Hill Cemetery
- Interactive map of Oak Hill Cemetery

Details
- Established: 1848
- Location: 30th and R Streets, NW; Georgetown, Washington, D.C., U.S.
- Country: United States
- Coordinates: 38°54′46″N 77°03′33″W
- Type: private
- Size: 22 acres (8.9 ha)
- Website: www.oakhillcemeterydc.org
- The Political Graveyard: Oak Hill Cemetery

Oak Hill Cemetery is a historic 22-acre (8.9 ha) cemetery located in the Georgetown neighborhood of Washington, D.C., in the United States. It was founded in 1848 and completed in 1853, and is a prime example of a rural cemetery. Many famous politicians, business people, military people, diplomats, and philanthropists are buried at Oak Hill, and the cemetery has a number of Victorian-style memorials and monuments. Oak Hill has two structures which are listed on the National Register of Historic Places: the Oak Hill Cemetery Chapel and the Van Ness Mausoleum.

The cemetery's (temporary) interment of "Willie" Lincoln, deceased son of president Abraham Lincoln, was the inspiration for the Man Booker Prize-winning novel Lincoln in the Bardo by George Saunders.

== History ==
Oak Hill began in 1848 as part of the rural cemetery movement, directly inspired by the success of Mount Auburn Cemetery near Boston, Massachusetts, when William Wilson Corcoran (also founder of the Corcoran Gallery of Art) purchased 15 acres (6.1 ha) of land. He then organized the Cemetery Company to oversee Oak Hill; it was incorporated by act of Congress on March 3, 1849.

Oak Hill's chapel was built in 1849 by noted architect James Renwick, who also designed the Smithsonian Institution's Castle on Washington Mall and St. Patrick's Cathedral, New York. His one-story rectangular chapel measures 23 by 41 feet (7×12 m) and sits on the cemetery's highest ridge. It is built of blue gneiss, in Gothic Revival style, with exterior trim in the same red Seneca sandstone used for the Castle.

By 1851, landscape designer Captain George F. de la Roche finished laying out the winding paths and terraces descending into Rock Creek valley. When initial construction was completed in 1853, Corcoran had spent over $55,000 on the cemetery's landscaping and architecture.

On October 4, 2022, historic preservationist Paul K. Williams became the cemetery's 14th Superintendent in residence and COO of the Oak Hill Cemetery Historic Cemetery Foundation.

== Notable interments ==
- Dean Acheson
- Madeleine Albright
- Gamaliel Bailey
- Margaret Lucy Shands Bailey
- James G. Blaine (formerly interred)
- Ben Bradlee
- William P. Burch
- Adolf Cluss
- Lorenzo Dow
- Peggy Eaton
- Roberta Flack
- Katharine Graham
- Joseph Henry
- Herman Hollerith
- Willie Lincoln (formerly interred)
- Myrtilla Miner
- Francis G. Newlands
- Edwin P. Parker Jr.
- Paul J. Pelz
- Charles Anthony Schott
- Mark Shields
- E. D. E. N. Southworth
- Edwin M. Stanton
- Cornelius Stribling
- Cadmus M. Wilcox

== In popular culture ==
- The cemetery is the setting of the 2017 George Saunders novel Lincoln in the Bardo.
- The cemetery was a part of the plot in the David Baldacci novel The Camel Club.
- A tomb in the cemetery is described as the site of a dead drop in the John Le Carre novel The Perfect Spy.
- The cemetery was a part of the plot in the Brad Meltzer novel The Inner Circle
- The cemetery released a history book, "Oak Hill Cemetery" by Laura Lavelle (nee Hackfeld) with Arcadia Publishing on January 22, 2024.

== Photo gallery ==
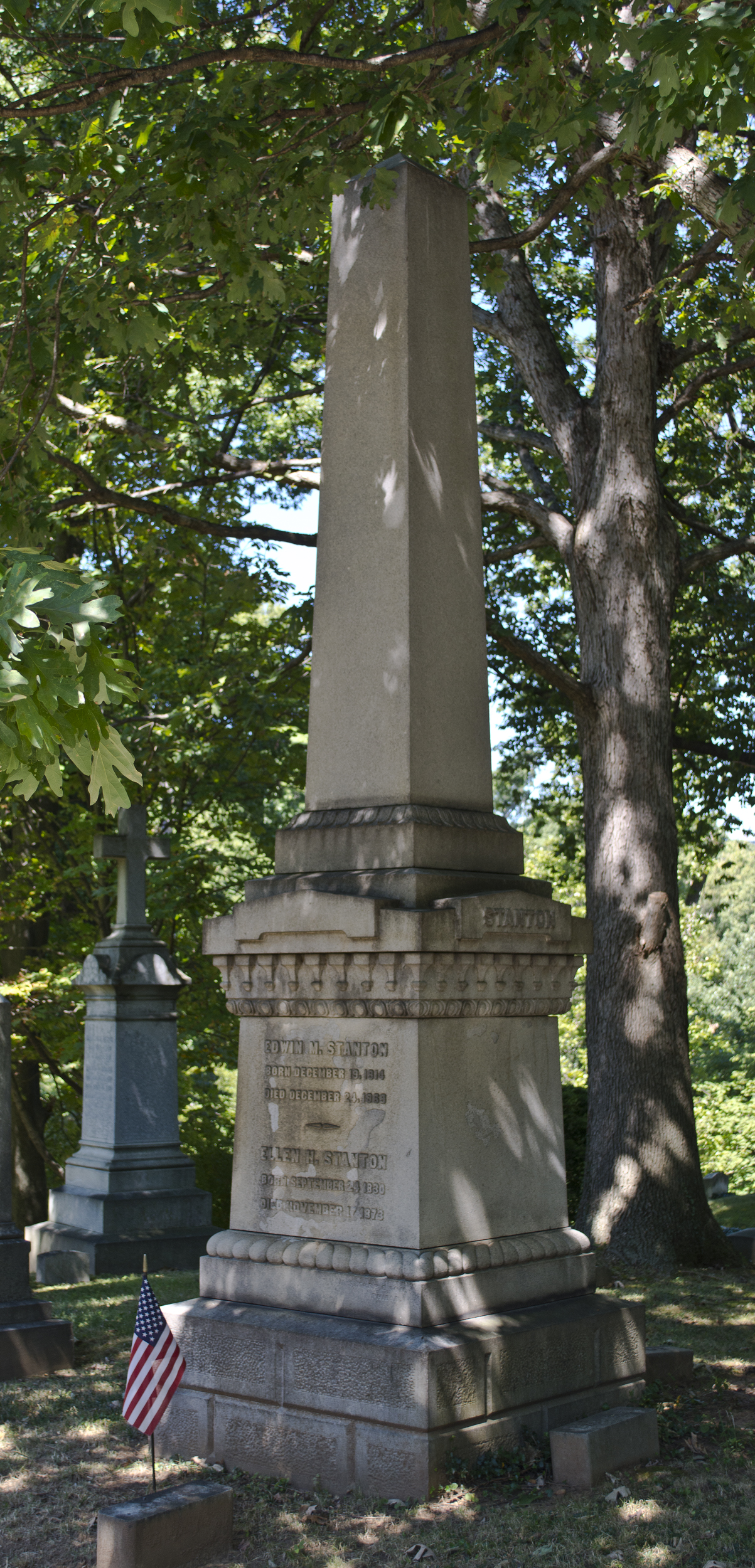
Memorial stone of Edwin M. Stanton, lawyer and politician

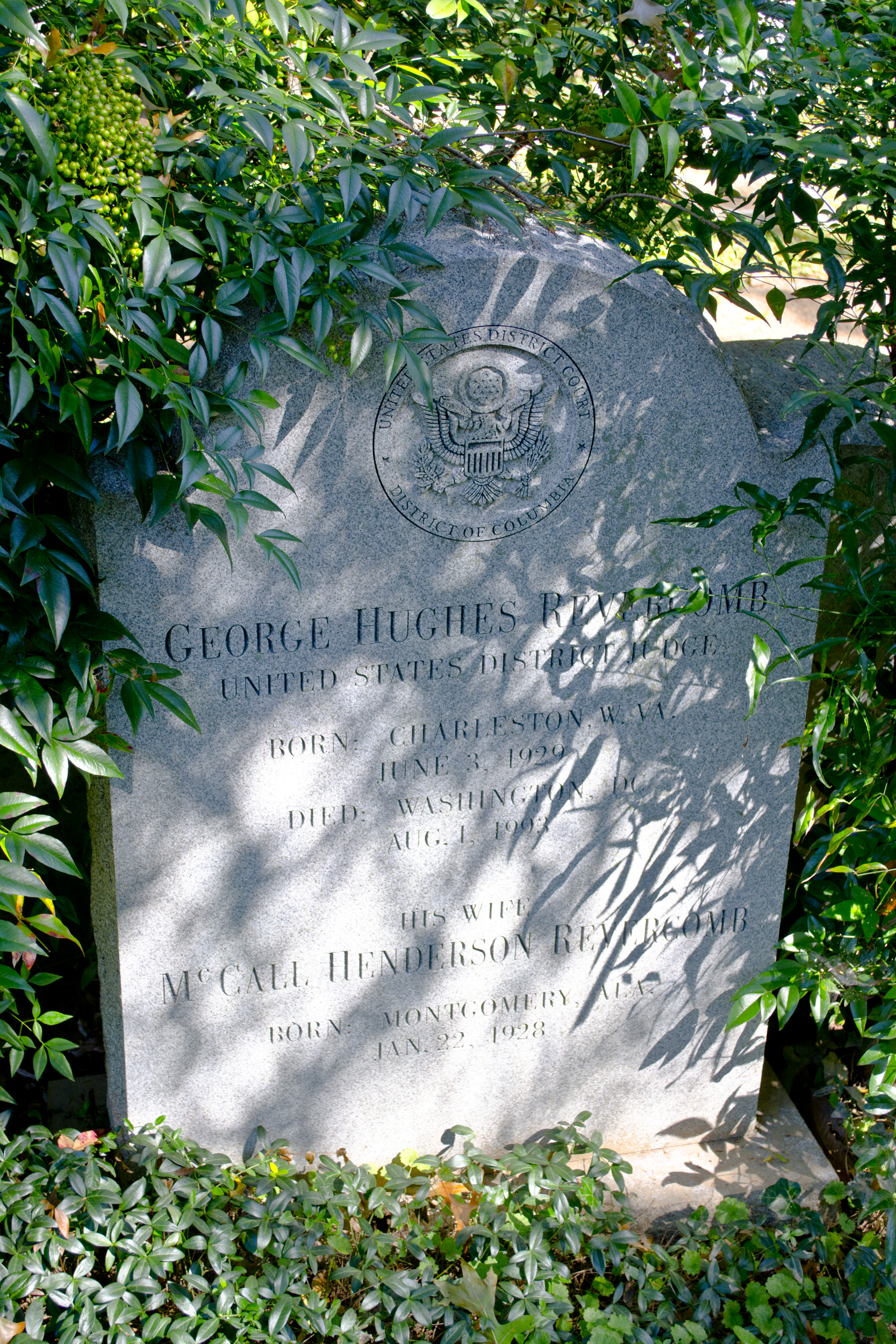
Memorial stone of George Hughes Revercomb, judge

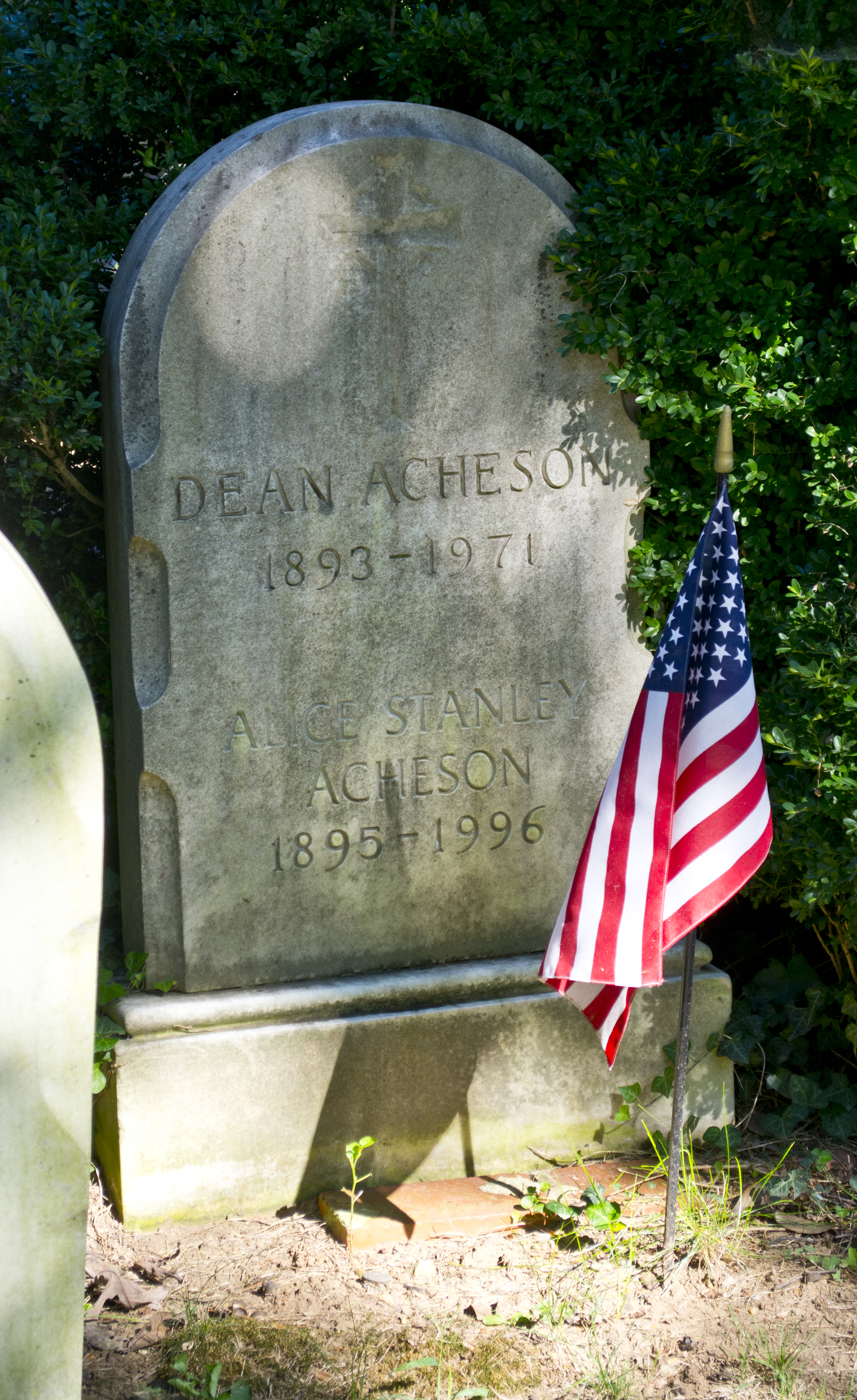
Memorial stone for Dean Acheson, lawyer, politician and former Secretary of State

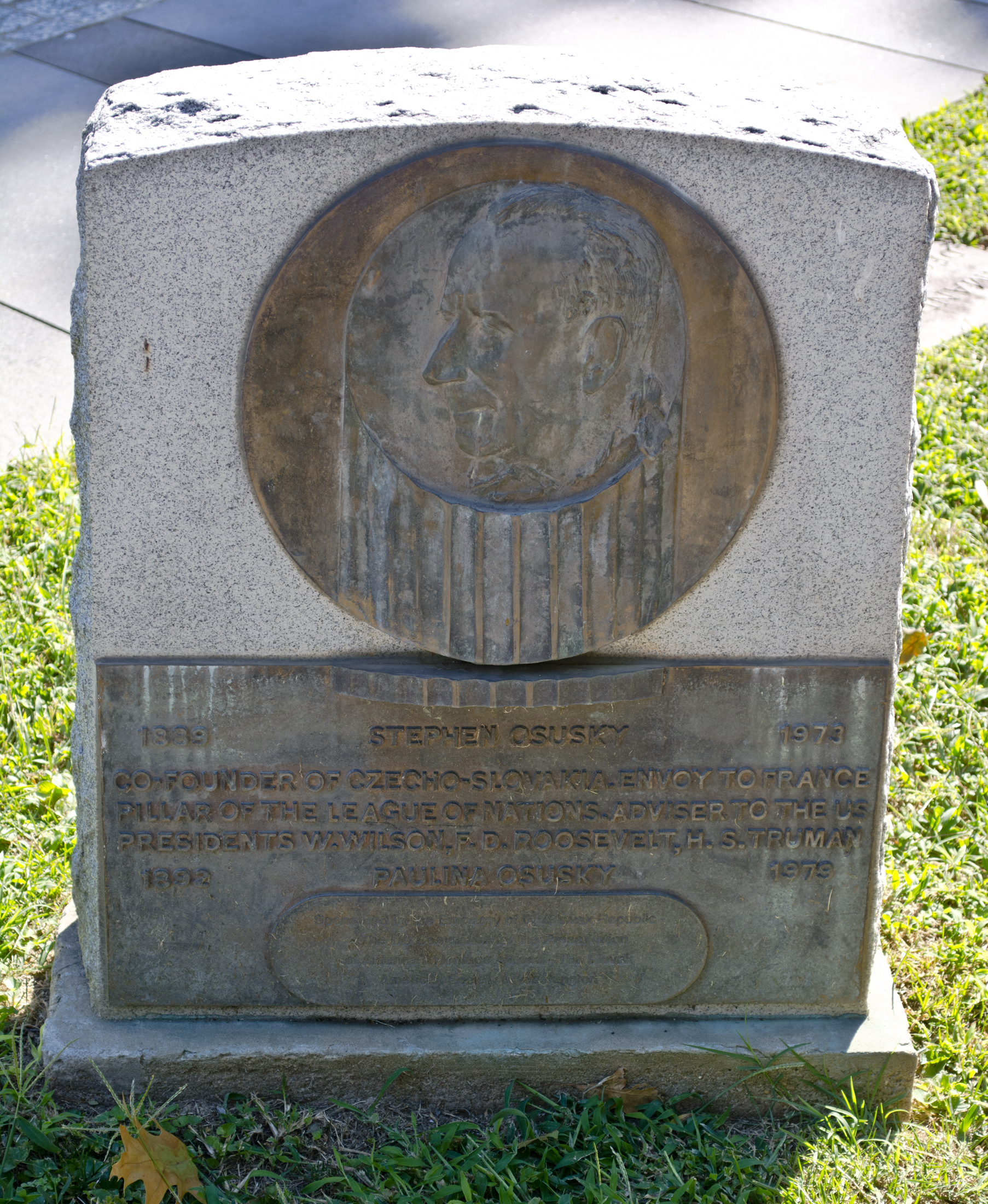
Memorial stone for Stefan Osusky, lawyer, diplomat, politician and co-founder of Czechoslovakia

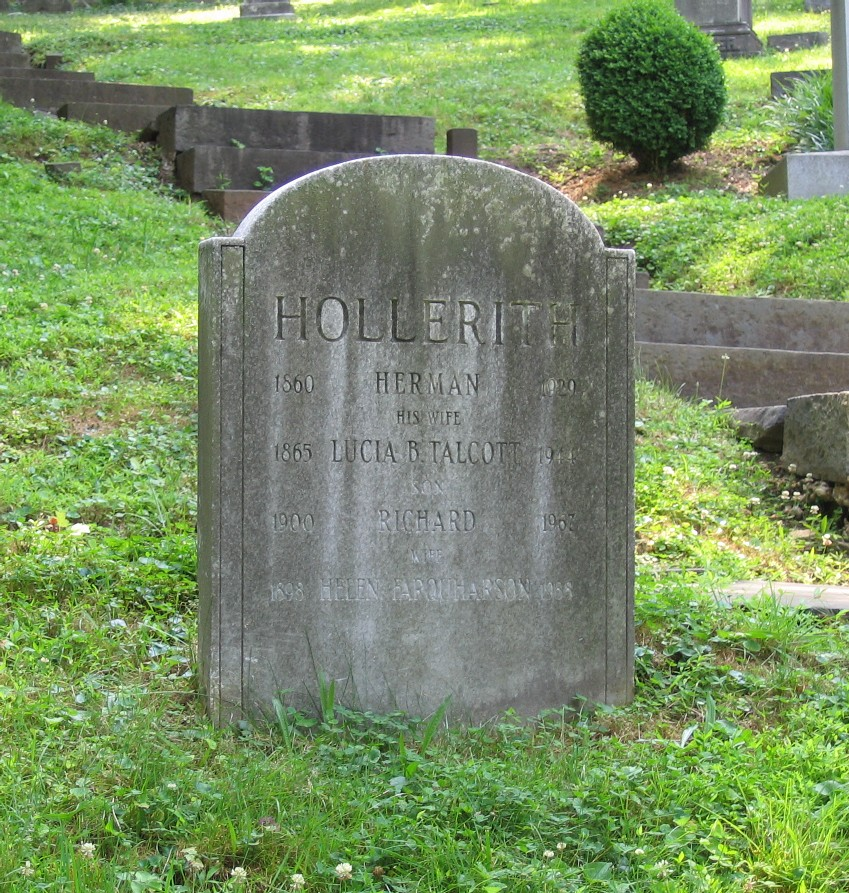
Memorial stone for Herman Hollerith, mathematician and inventor

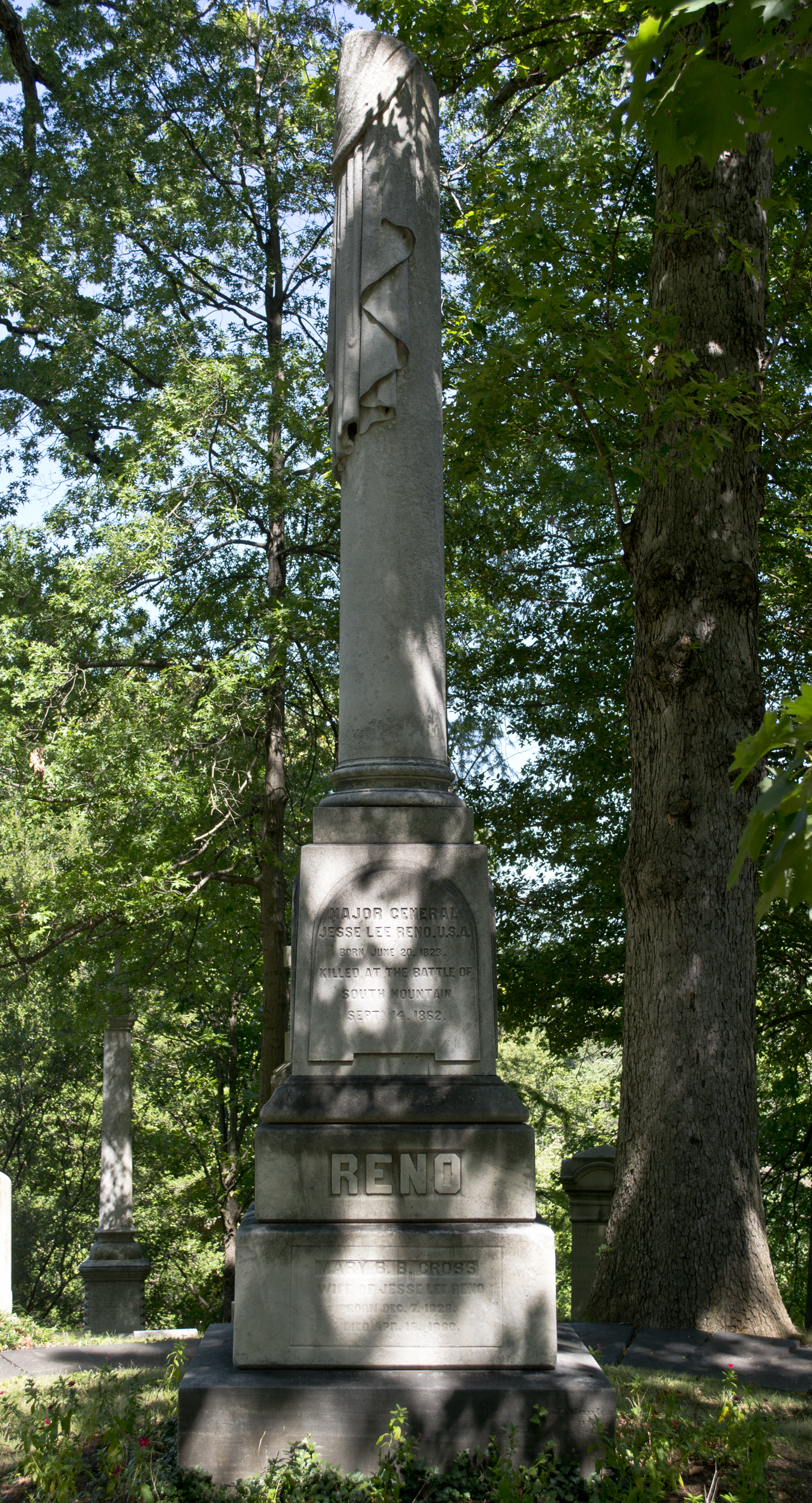
Memorial stone of Jesse L. Reno, general

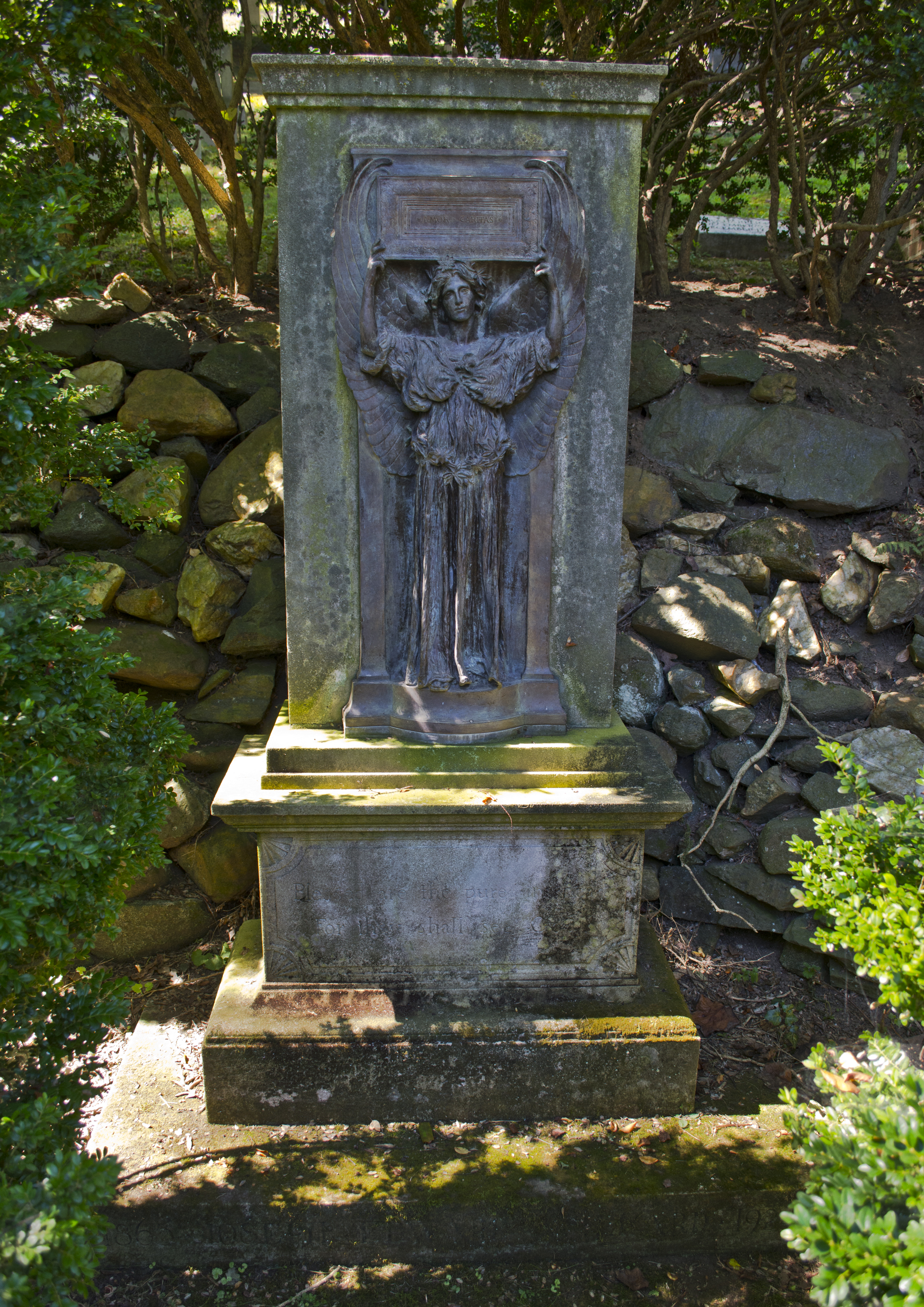
Memorial stone of Joseph Edward Willard, diplomat and politician

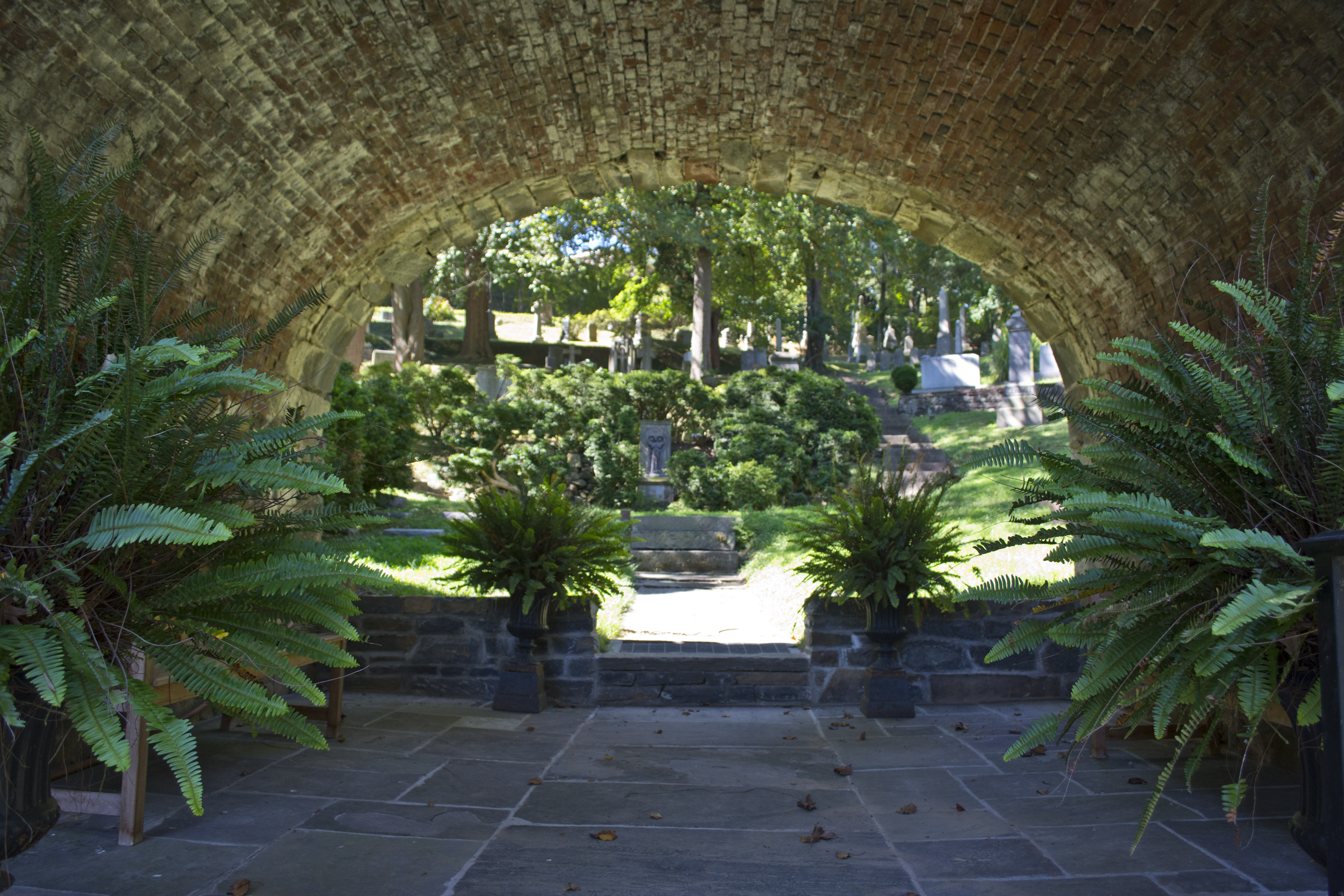

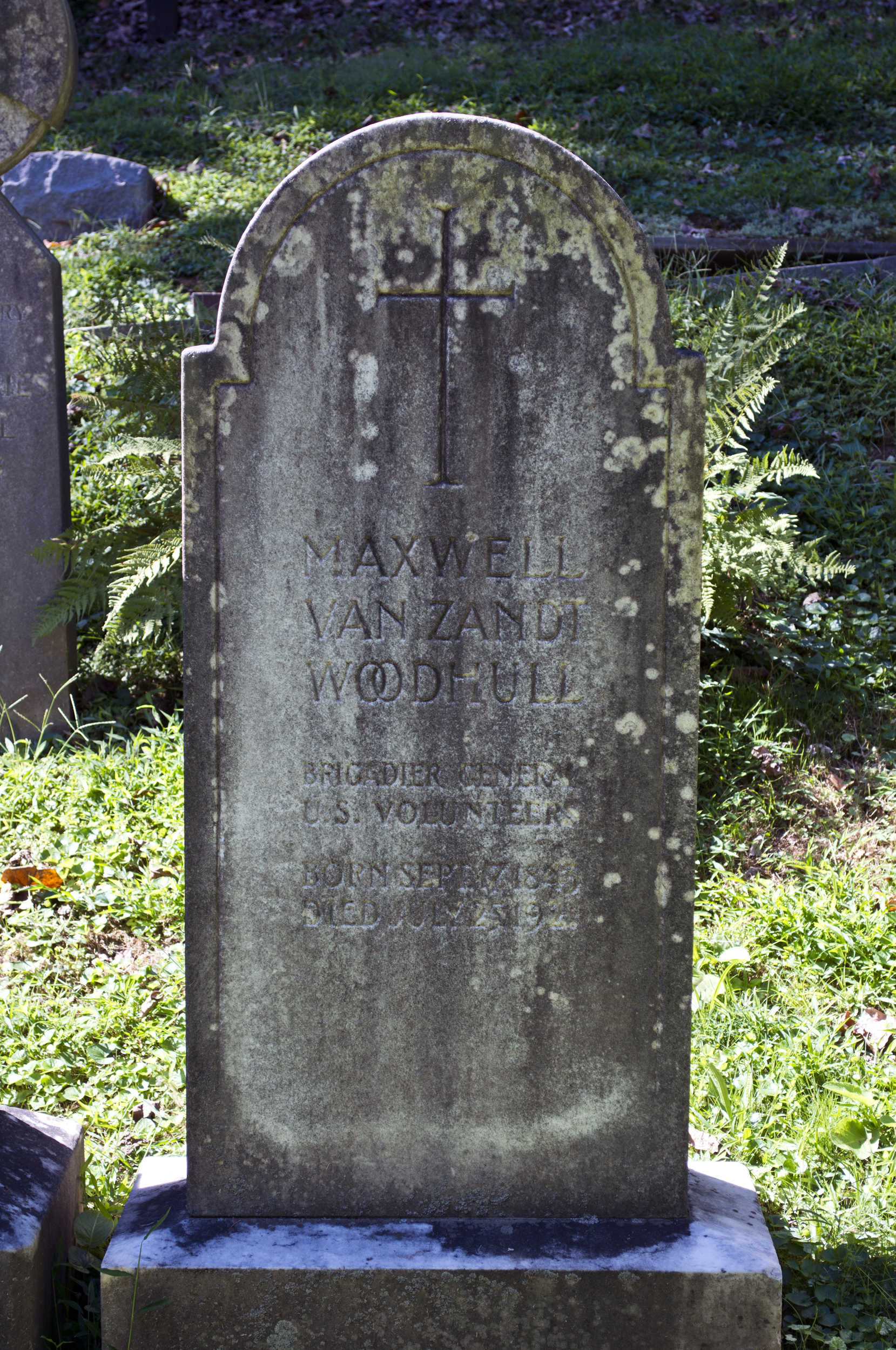
Memorial stone of Maxwell Van Zandt Woodhull, soldier

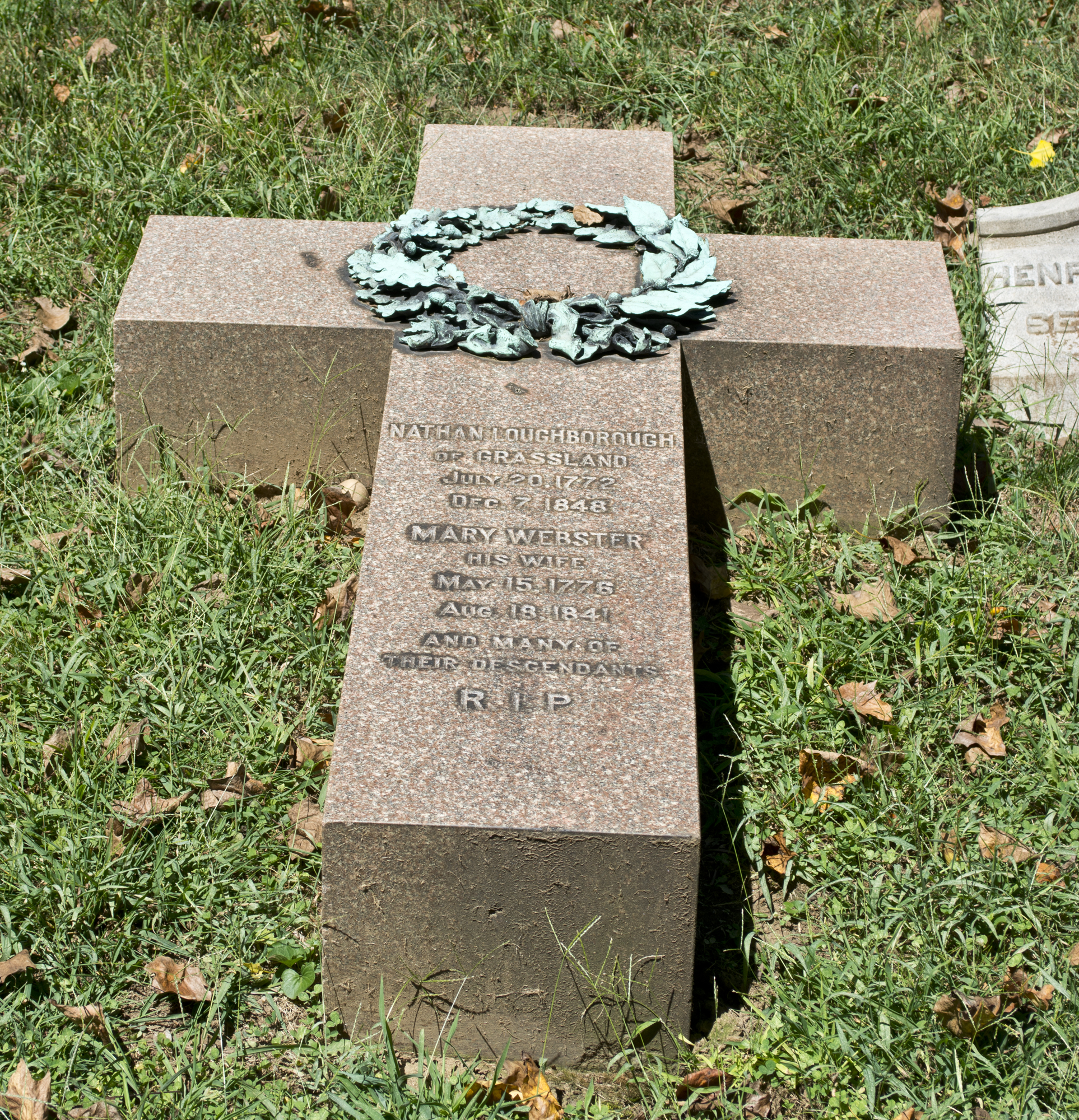
Memorial stone of Nathan Loughborough, Comptroller of the Treasury

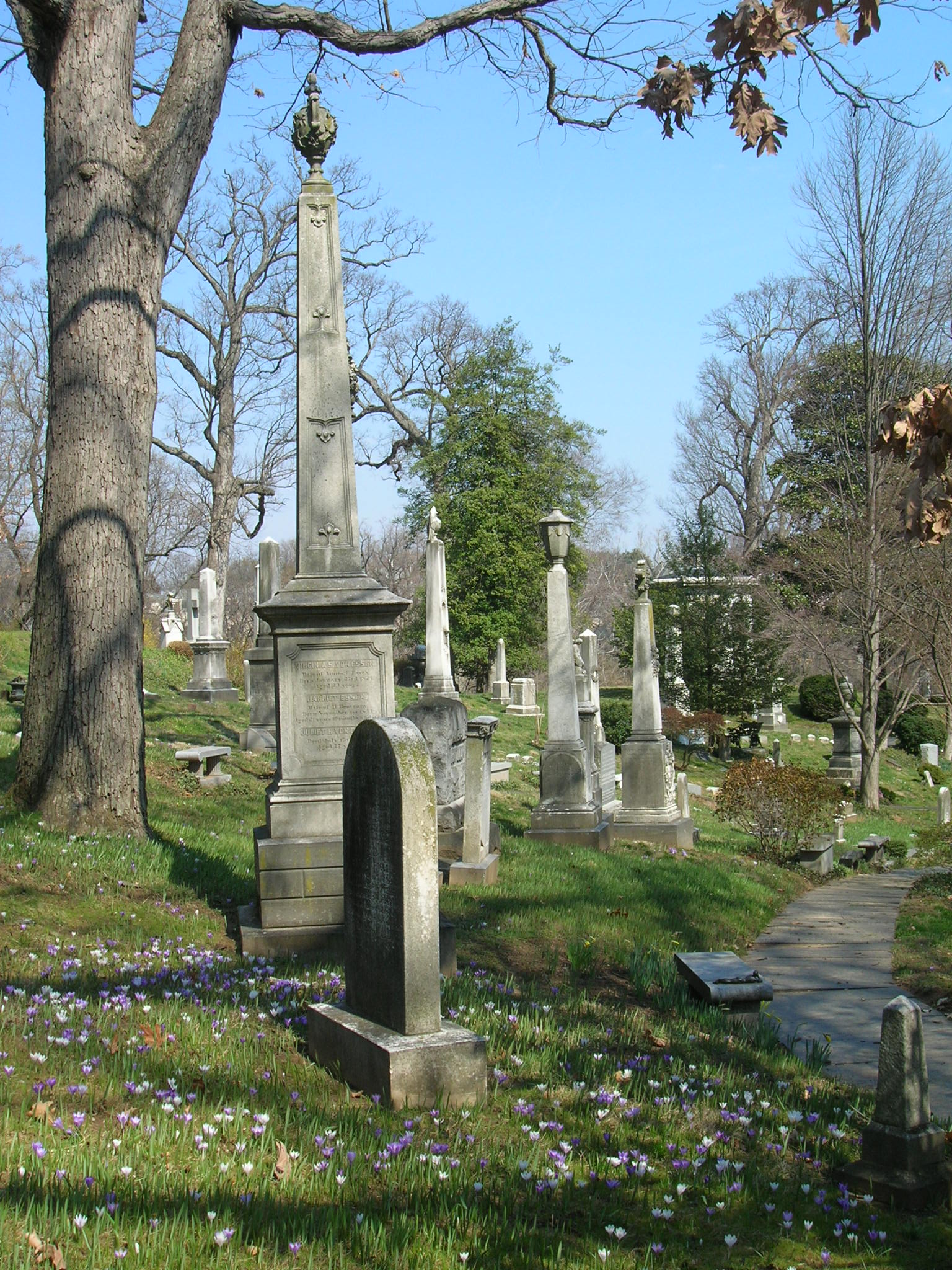

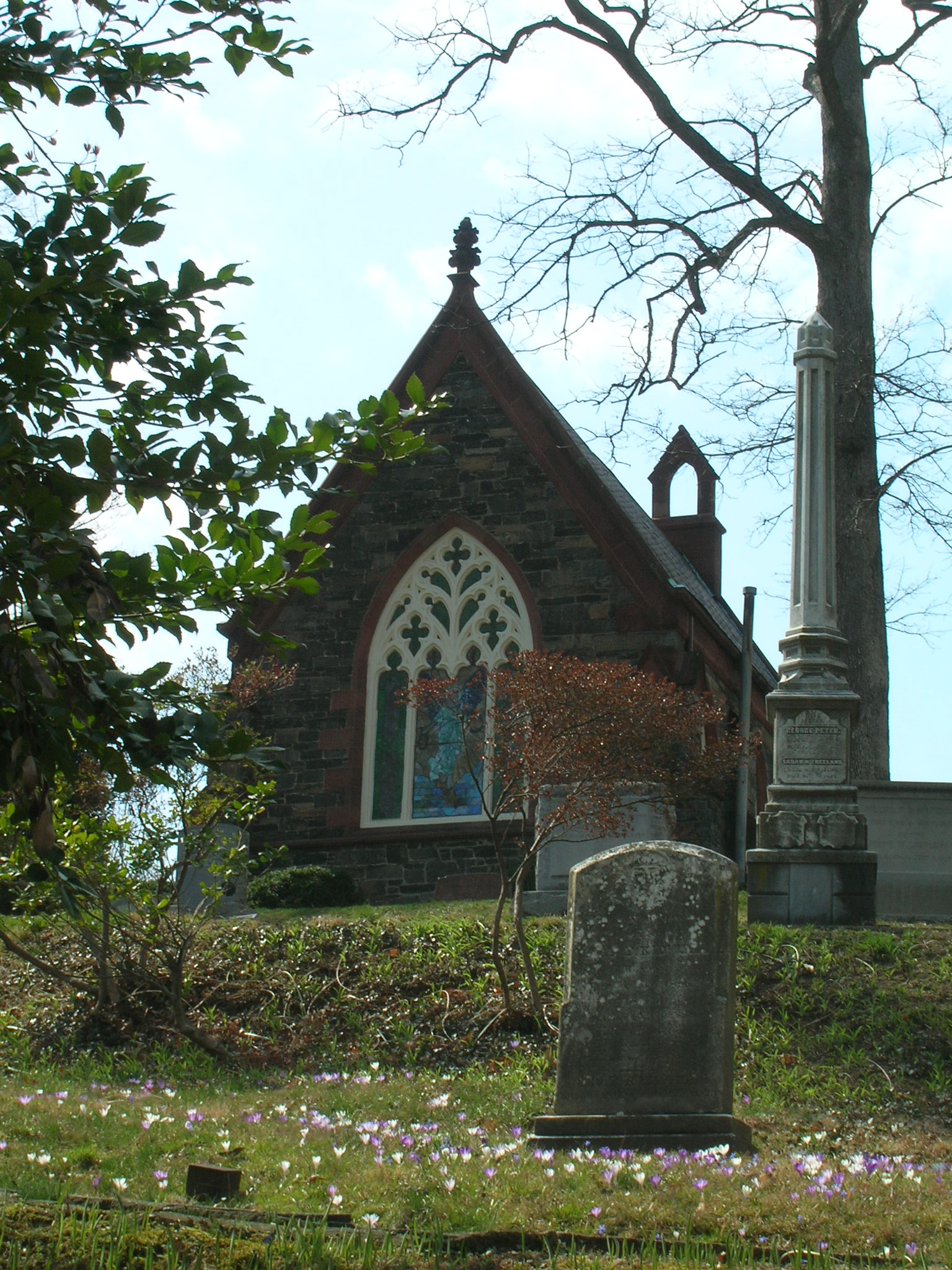

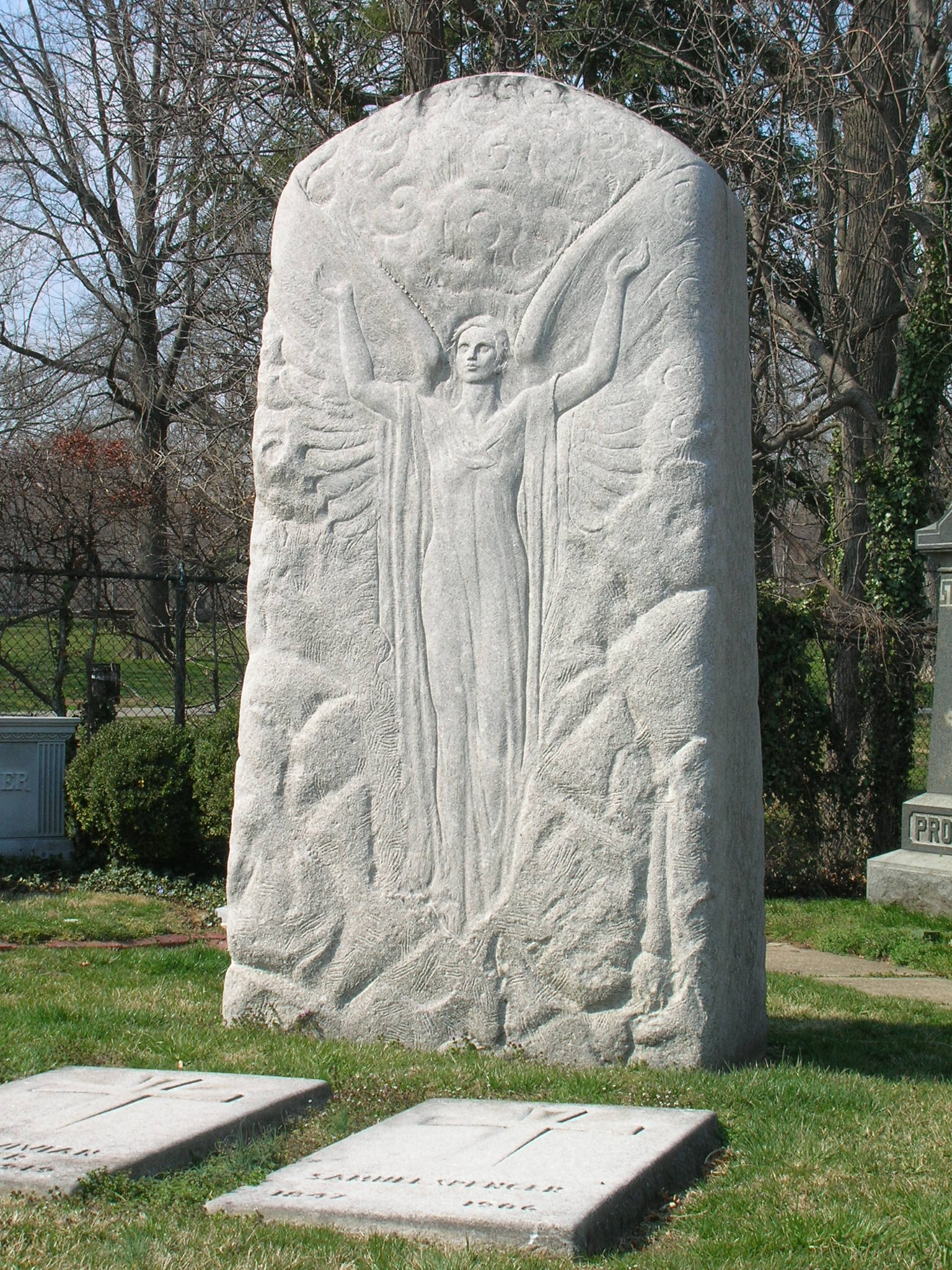

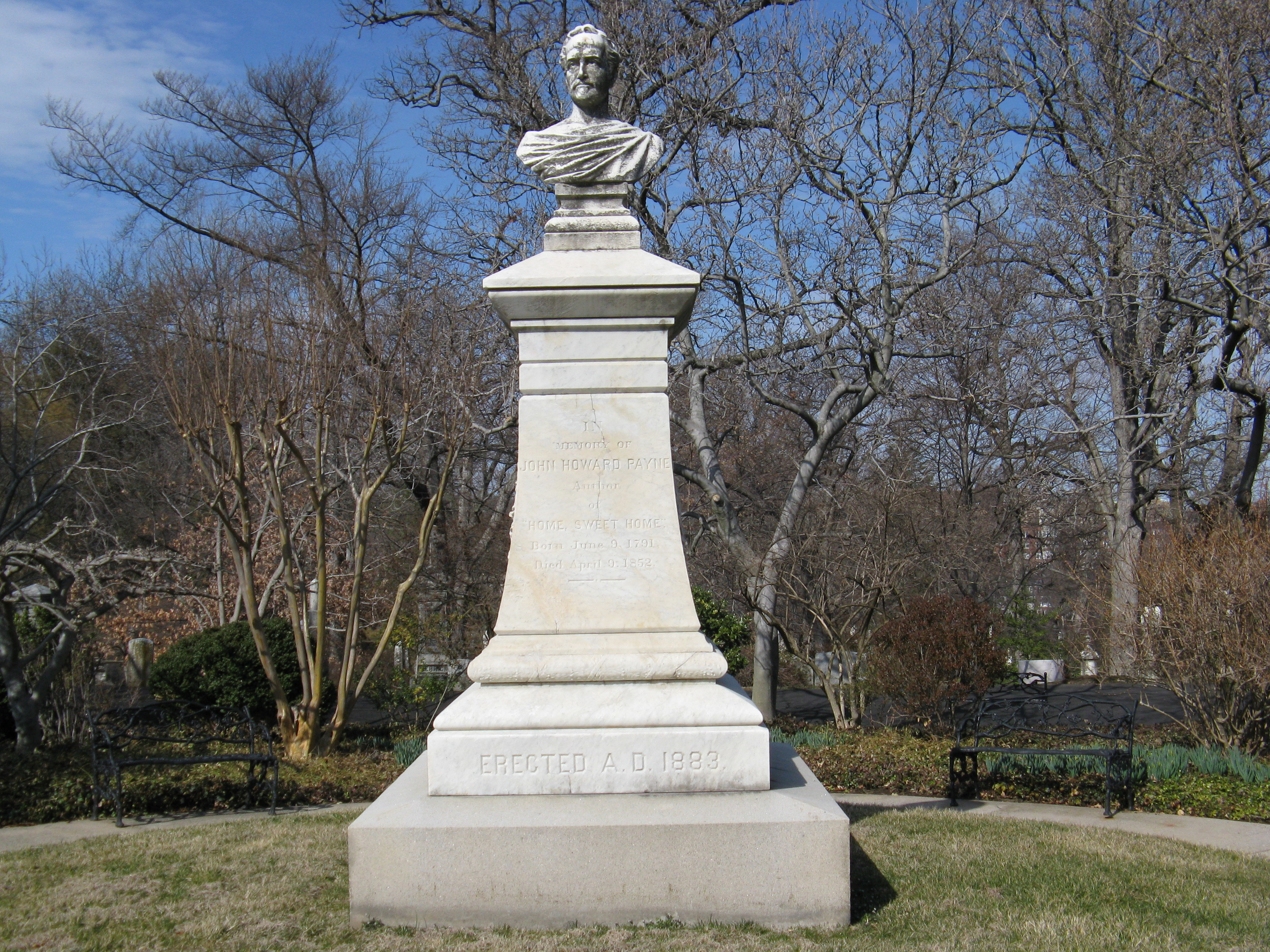
Memorial stone of John Howard Payne, poet, writer, playwright and actor

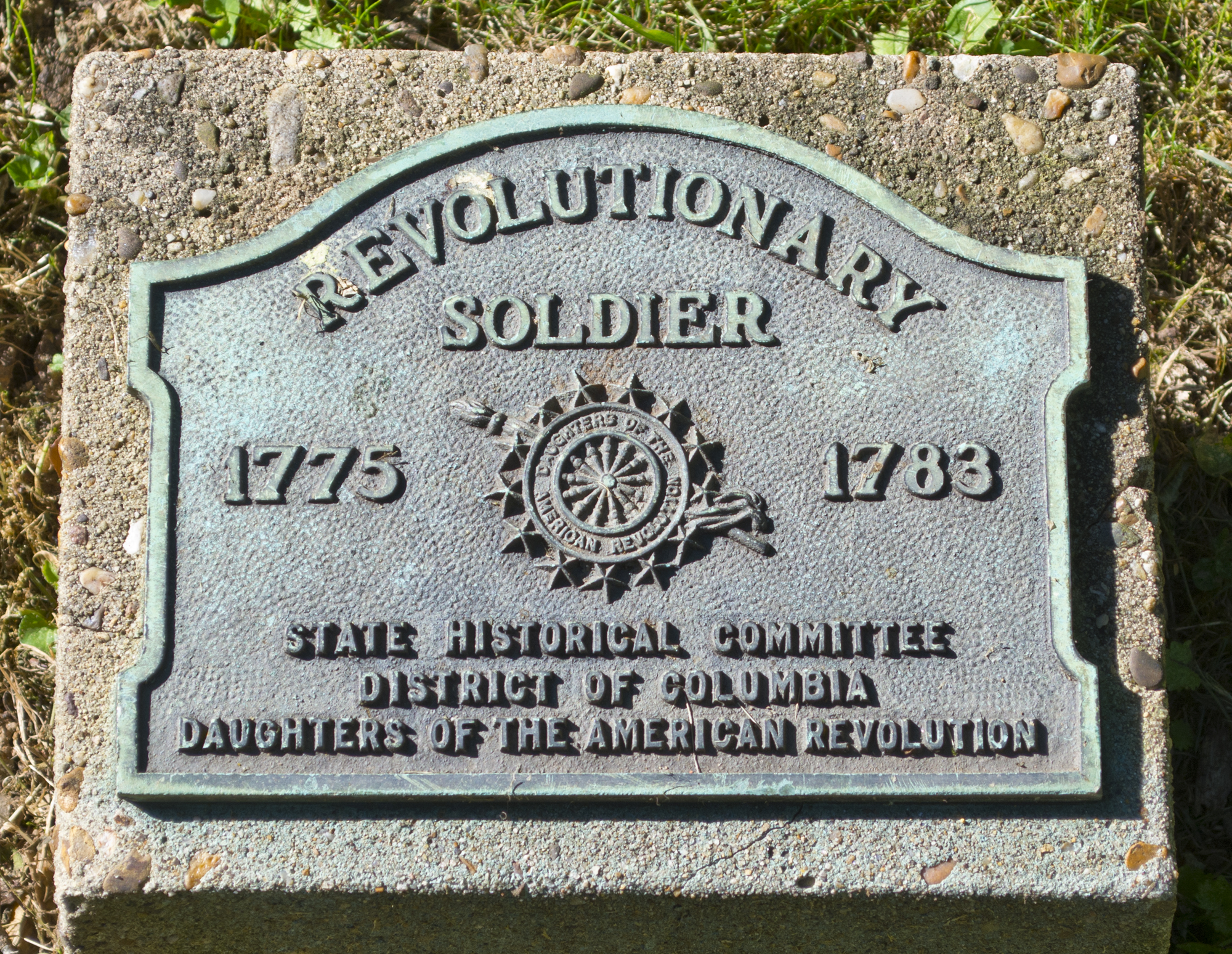
Unknown Revolutionary War soldier marker

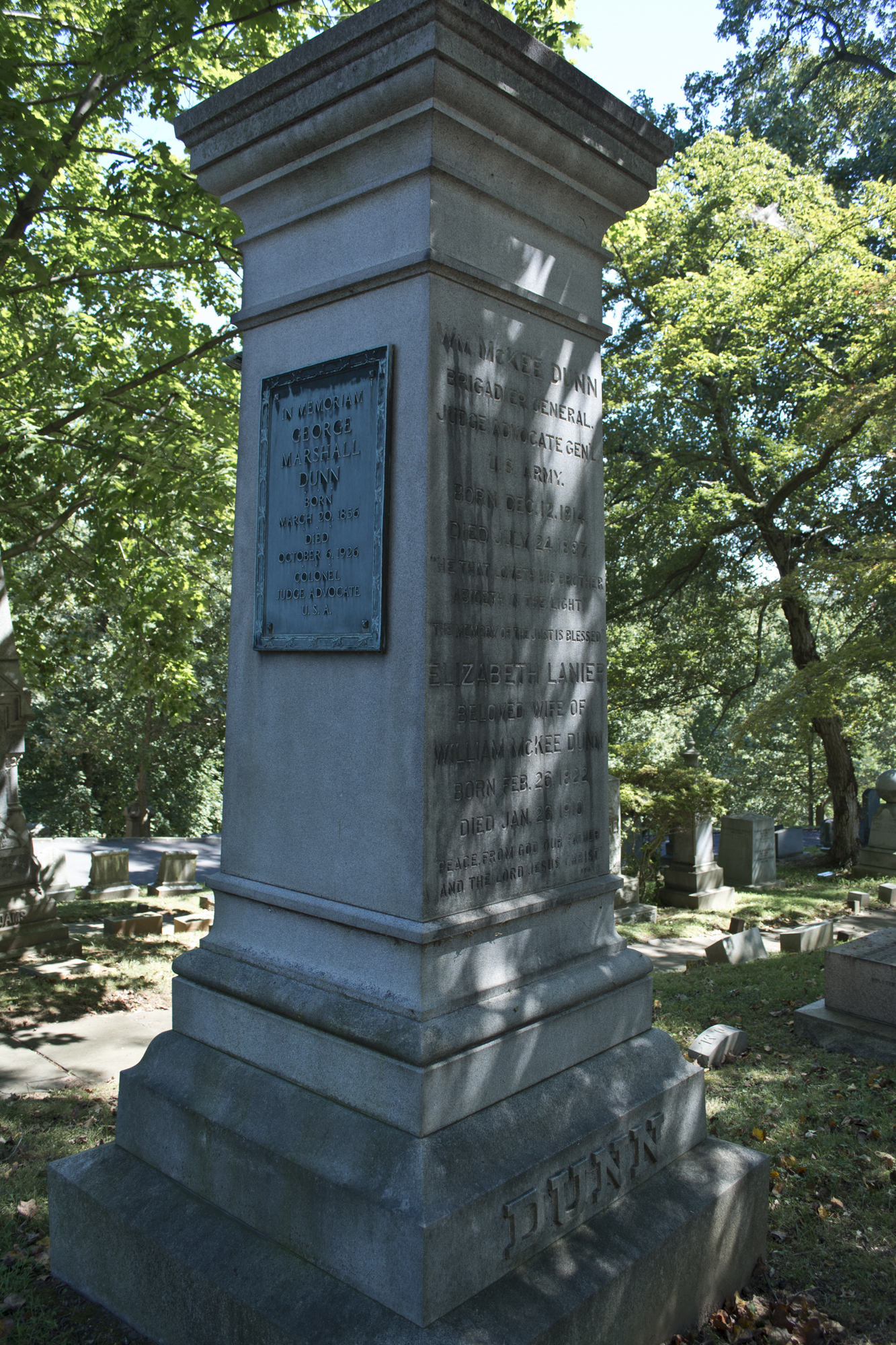
Memorial stone of William McKee Dunn, lawyer, judge and politician

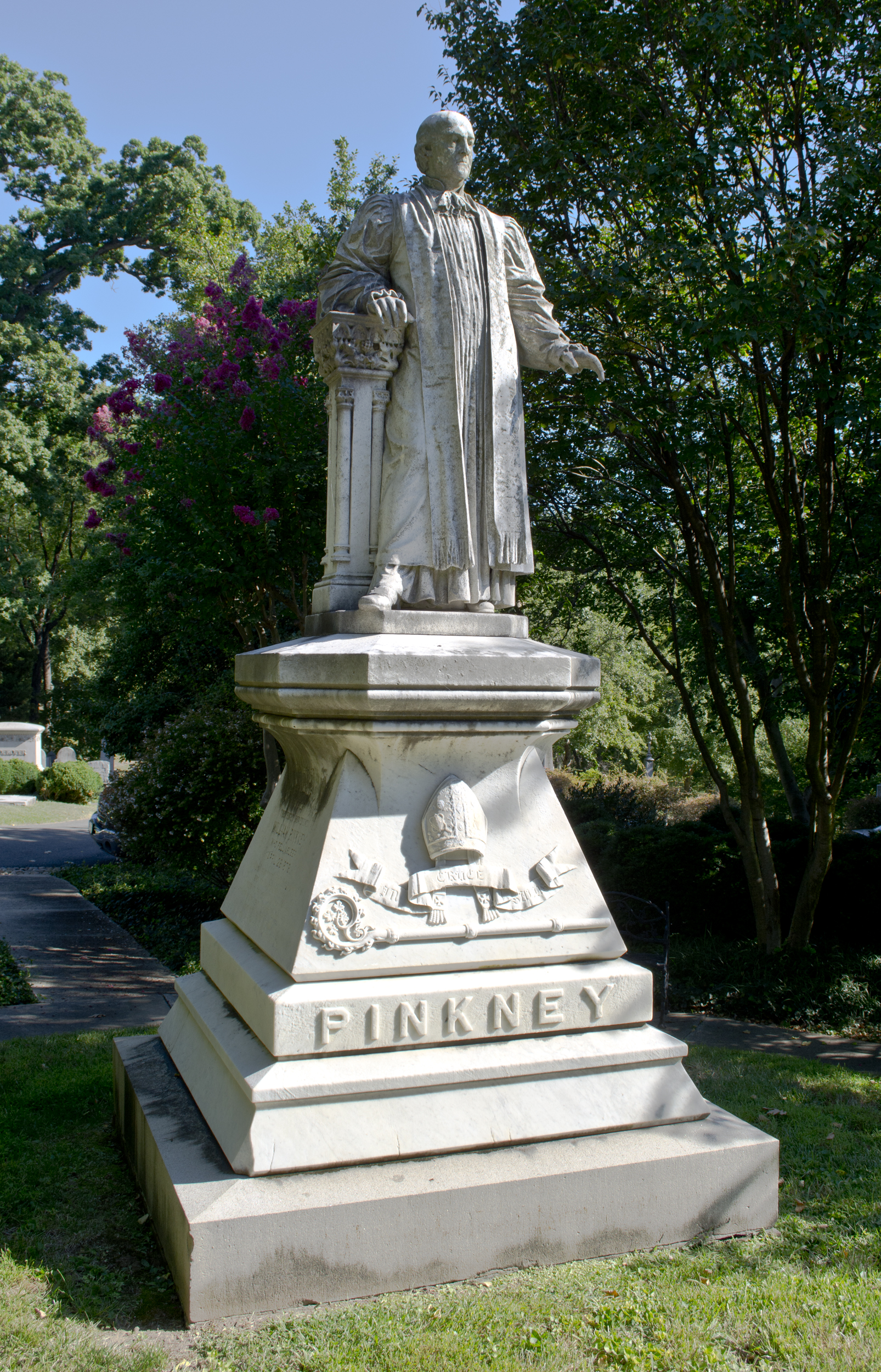
Memorial stone of William Pinkney, Episcopal Bishop of Maryland

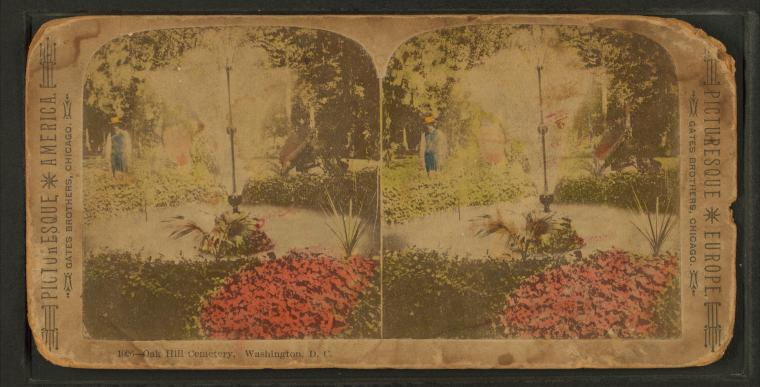

== See also ==
- List of burial places of justices of the Supreme Court of the United States

== Bibliography ==
- Dodge, Andrew R. (2005). Biographical Directory of the United States Congress: 1774–2005. Washington, D.C.: U.S. Government Printing Office. ISBN 9780160731761.
