= Gamaliel Bailey =

American abolitionist and journalist (1807–1859)

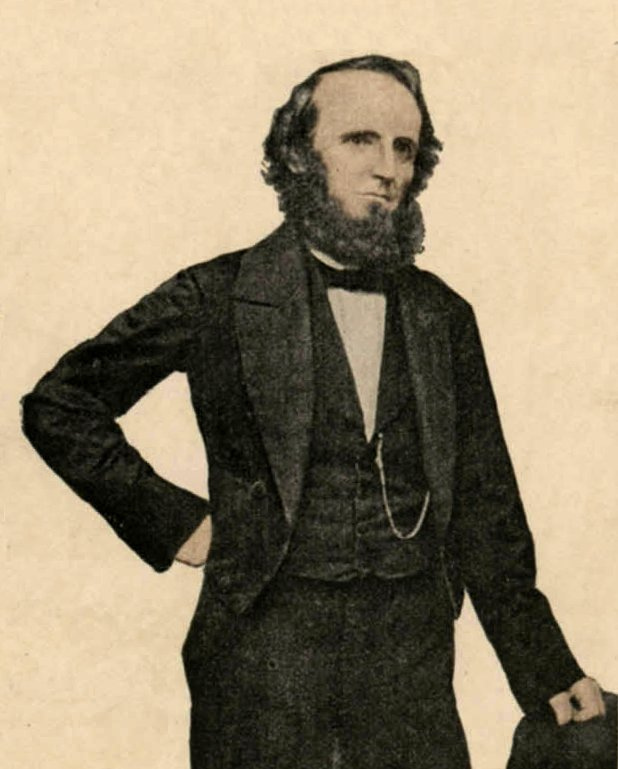
- Gamaliel Bailey in 1857
- Born: December 3, 1807; Mount Holly, New Jersey, U.S.
- Died: June 5, 1859 (aged 51)
- Education: Jefferson Medical College Philadelphia
- Occupations: Physician; publisher
- Known for: Abolitionist

Gamaliel Bailey (December 3, 1807 – June 5, 1859) was one of America's leading anti-slavery journalists whose newspaper National Era, based in the nation's capital, held a prominent voice in shaping the country's abolitionist movement and its visibility.

== Early life and education ==
Gamaliel Bailey was born in Mount Holly Township, New Jersey, in 1807, the son of a dedicated Methodist preacher. At the age of nine, he moved with his family to Philadelphia, where he received his education both at home and in local schools.

Bailey completed his medical degree at Jefferson Medical College in 1827, graduating at age twenty. He soon moved to Baltimore, where he served as editor of the Methodist Protestant, a short-lived journal of the Methodist Protestant reform movement.

== Early career and abolitionist work ==
In 1831, Bailey moved to Cincinnati, where he set up a medical practice. He also lectured on physiology at the Lane Theological Seminary.

He was present during the 1834 Lane Debates on Slavery, which ignited the abolitionist movement, drew outrage from school officials and the city, and led to a revolt of anti-slavery students who left for Oberlin College. He soon became an ardent convert to abolitionism.

In 1836, Bailey joined James G. Birney in the editorial control of The Philanthropist, the official newspaper of the Ohio Anti-Slavery Society. The following year he succeeded Birney as editor, and later sole proprietor. Anti-slavery tracts from The Philanthropist were reprinted as accessible pamphlets entitled Facts for the People. He directed the paper in publishing anti-slavery articles until 1847, in spite of threats and acts of violence. The printing office of The Philanthropist was wrecked three times by pro-slavery mobs. In 1843, Bailey evolved The Philanthropist into the Cincinnati Morning Herald, which he ran for three years.

== National Era and influence in Washington, D.C. ==
In 1847, he left Cincinnati and moved to Washington, DC to assumed control of the new abolitionist publication, The National Era. His offices were attacked by pro-slavery mobs; in 1848, he and his printers were under siege for three days as a mob held them hostage.

This paper had a considerable national circulation.

In 1851–1852, the paper published Harriet Beecher Stowe's Uncle Tom's Cabin as a weekly serial.

In December 1854, Bailey helped persuade Montgomery Blair to represent Dred Scott in his Supreme Court case pro bono, by agreeing to underwrite his expenses. By May 11, 1857, the Scott case had incurred $63.18 in court costs and $91.50 for the printing of briefs. Bailey asked the 75 Republican members of Congress to contribute $2.00 each, and covered the rest himself.

== Death and legacy ==
In 1859, Bailey died at the age of 51, at sea, aboard the steamship Arago, while en route to Europe.

His body was originally buried in Congressional Cemetery in Washington, D.C.

His wife, Margaret Lucy Shands Bailey, died in 1888 and was buried at Oak Hill Cemetery, across the city.

Their son, Marcellus Bailey, later had Bailey’s remains disinterred and reburied in an unmarked grave beside Margaret.

His great-granddaughter is the artist Fay Jones.

== Writings ==
- Bailey, Gamaliel (1838). "G. Bailey's Letter [to the convention of abolitionists]. Published according to order". Proceedings of the Indiana convention, assembled to organize a state anti-slavery society, held in Milton, Wayne Co., September 12th, 1838. Cincinnati. pp. 13–16.
