= Charles Anthony Schott =

German-American scientist

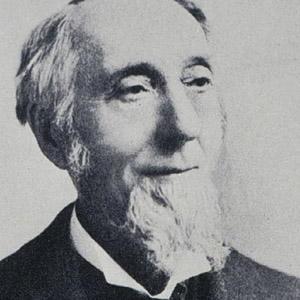
- Born: August 7, 1826; Mannheim, Baden, Germany
- Died: July 31, 1901 (aged 74); Washington, D.C.
- Resting place: Oak Hill Cemetery

Charles Anthony Schott (August 7, 1826 – July 31, 1901) was a German-American scientist.

== Biography ==
Charles Anthony Schott was born at Mannheim, Baden, Germany on August 7, 1826. In 1847 he was graduated from the Polytechnic School, at Karlsruhe. The following year he came to the United States and entered the United States Coast Survey. In 1853 he received his naturalization papers as an American citizen, and in 1856 he was promoted to the grade of an assistant in the service. Mr. Schott was a member of the Government parties that observed the total eclipse of the sun in August 1869, at Springfield, Illinois, and at Catania, Sicily, in December 1870.

In 1898, he was a delegate to the International Conference on Terrestrial Magnetism, which was held at Bristol, England. Mr. Schott was a member of many scientific societies, among them the American Philosophical Society (1863), National Academy of Sciences, Washington Academy of Sciences, and the American Association for the Advancement of Science. He was also the author of many papers on hydrography, geodesy, tides, and meteorology, and physics of the globe in Smithsonian Institution publications. The French Academy conferred on him its highest honor – a medal for his researches in terrestrial magnetism.

He died at his home in Washington, D.C., on July 31, 1901, and was buried at Oak Hill Cemetery.
