= The National Era =

Abolitionist newspaper in Washington, DC

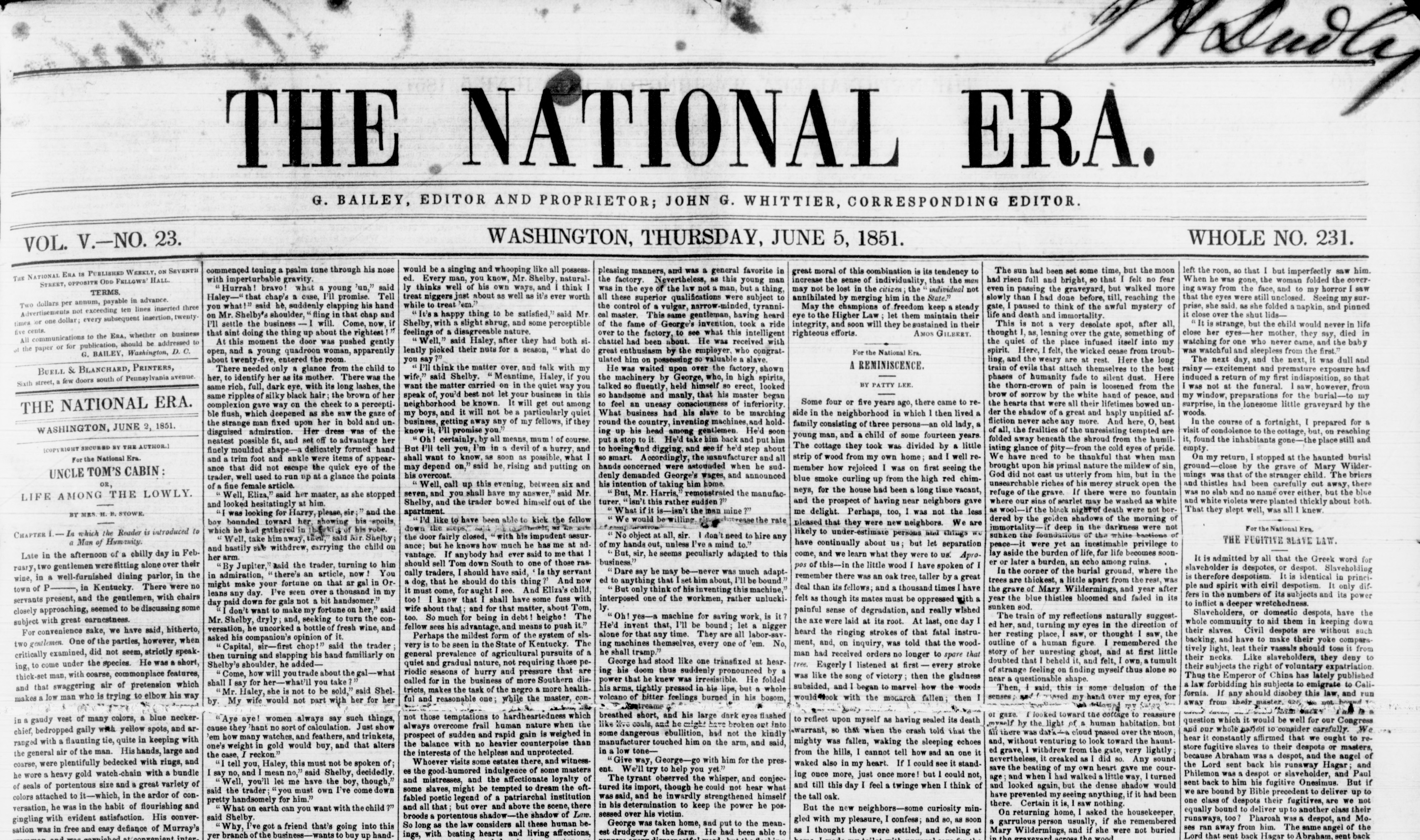
The National Era (June 5, 1851)

The National Era was an abolitionist newspaper published weekly in Washington, D.C., from 1847 to 1860. Gamaliel Bailey was its editor in its first year. The National Era Prospectus stated in 1847:

While due attention will be paid to Current Events, Congressional Proceedings, General Politics and Literature, the great aim of the paper will be a complete discussion of the Question of Slavery, and an exhibition of the Duties of the Citizen in relation to it; especially will it explain and advocate the leading Principles and Measures of the Liberty Party, seeking to do this, not in the spirit of the Party, but in the love of Truth—not for the triumph of Party, but for the establishment of Truth.

Each number contained four pages of seven (later eight) columns each. The National Era was noted for its large size and unique type. For subscribers in the United Kingdom, the price of the newspaper was three dollars per year. In 1854, The National Era was published daily, during the Session of Congress.

== Subscription and rates of advertising ==
According to the terms of subscription of The National Era, there was many options for one to subscribe. The publication was published every Thursday. A subscriber could buy at the following rates:

- One copy a week for a year = $2.00
- Three copies for a year = $5.00
- Five copies for a year = $8.00
- Ten copies for a year = $15.00
- One copy for six months = $1.00
- Ten copies for six months = $8.00

Subscribers could also make a club, consisting of 5 or 10 people, to receive a discount on subscriptions.

The rates of advertising stood at ten cents a line, and five cents for every other line. According to Bailey, ten words make up a line. Bailey required the payment in advance.

== Historical Context and Influence ==
The National Era was written and published during a tumultuous time. This was at the peak of divisions over the issue of slavery in the United States. The Compromise of 1850 and the Fugitive Slave Act made these pressures worse. These laws drew attention to issues regular people weren't paying attention to. Because of this, newspapers were heavily relied on for sharing ideas and influencing people's perceptions of slavery.

The National Era was so unique because the main focus wasn't on politics. The newspaper included fiction stories and other works of literature. These stories became crucial for helping readers see slavery in a more understandable way. Most people in the North had little to no experience with slavery directly, so it could feel a little distant to them. These works changed that by showing what life was like for enslaved people and helping readers connect with the topic instead of just reading about it as something happening somewhere in the world.

== Formatting and work choices ==
The formatting of The National Era was four large pages, and had seven columns on each page. These pages were laid side by side, in order to attract readers of every walk of life: women, children, and men. Most papers put poetry and fiction on the last few pages, but The National Era did not.

Poetry and fiction was incorporated into different sections of the paper, breaking up news and political debates. There was no clearly labeled column for works such as Uncle Tom's Cabin.

The poetry and stories found in the paper gave readers an easy way to digest issues that happened. Most abolitionist papers, the fictional part of the paper only plays a minor role in slavery. The National Era avoided the subject until Stowe started to publish in the paper.

== Notable contributors ==
It featured the works of John Greenleaf Whittier, who served as associate editor, and the first publication, as a serial, of Harriet Beecher Stowe's Uncle Tom's Cabin (1851). It was also the setting for the first publication of Nathaniel Hawthorne's "The Great Stone Face". In 1859, after Mr. Bailey's decease, his wife, Margaret Lucy Shands Bailey, served as publisher until the time of its suspension, February 1860. Before the death of Gamaliel Bailey, Sarah Jane Lippincott, formerly Grace Greenwood, was an editorial assistant and reporter for The National Era, for where she got her start. Lippincott went on to be an accomplished author, who attributed much of her success to The National Era. Lippincott reported for The National Era all across the United States and even spanning Europe.

== "Annual Letter" ==
Each year The National Era was published, Bailey published an "Annual Letter." The letter was published in November in each year, with the goal to be that the subscribers renew their subscriptions for the following year. In 1851, Bailey noted that the goal of The National Era was to not only be a paper of high literary tone, but a paper where human rights were advocated for.

== National Era faces backlash ==
The National Era faced backlash in a publication of the Radical Abolitionist, in regards to a statement made counter-acting Reverdy Johnson, during the Dred Scott v. Sandford case. Johnson said before the Supreme Court that the Constitution allows for people to be owned as property. The National Era then came out to argue this claim, disputing any support from the Constitution of slavery.

The Radical Abolitionist wrote, focusing on critiquing the statement of the National Era. The Radical Abolitionist says that the Constitution does not say anything about slavery, and encourages The National Era to consider the full scope of their statement.

== "The Soft Answer" ==
Bailey's idea of "The Soft Answer" emphasizes the power of carefully chosen language to resolve conflict and influence society. This idea is illustrated clearly in Timothy Shay Arthur's story "The Soft Answer," in which a tense business dispute between two former friends is resolved not through confrontation, but a calm mollifying letter. Instead of responding to the situation with anger, the main character is persuaded to adopt a more appeasing tone, which ultimately led to the reconciliation. That idea suggested a gradualist approach to abolish slavery. This idea of gradual steps to get two sides to agree is something that many felt that the North and South could use to abolish slavery and integrate the African Americans into society.

Bailey argued that social change does not happen all at once, but gradually through the transformation of individual thoughts and attitudes. He believed that by influencing individuals, publications like The National Era could help shape society as a whole. Rather than supporting violent action, Bailey promoted "sober" and open discussion grounded in facts and good reasoning. He believed this method could reduce prejudice over time.

Additionally, Bailey placed significant value on the way in which things are being said and the tone used when saying them. Both Arthur's story and Bailey's own writing suggest that the way something is being said is just as important as what is being said. Calm language and rational thinking was used as a tool for controlling emotional responses and allows for thoughtfulness when speaking about difficult issues like slavery.

However, writers in The National Era began to recognize that emotion also played a necessary role. Later works suggested that feelings such as sympathy could help prepare readers to accept modern arguments. As a result, sentiment became interconnected with emotional storytelling helping to support Bailey's original vision of gradual reform through thoughtful communication.

== Legacy ==
The National Era’s impact lives on well after its publication ended. A newspaper of this influence helped show that literature and reporting work as partners to get its message across and bring attention to serious issues. The National Era is well known for its publication of Uncle Tom’s Cabin, a highly influential book about slavery that is still being discussed to this day.

The paper also emphasized writing as a tool for reform. The National Era structured a new way of thinking for society.

== See also ==
- Abolitionist publications
