= Donald Trump photo op at St. John's Church =

2020 controversial presidential photo op

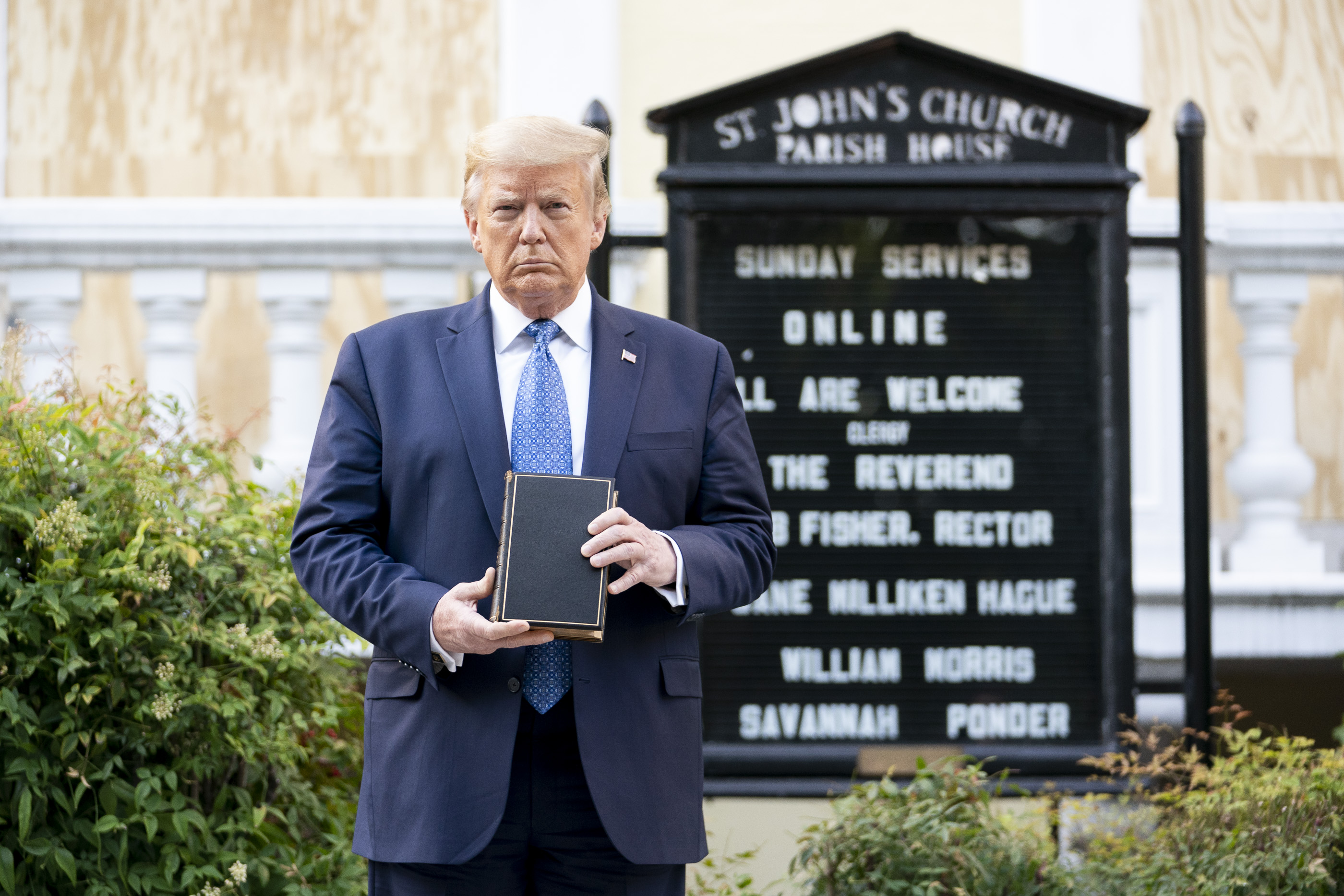
- President Donald Trump holding a Bible in front of Ashburton House, the parish house of St. John's Episcopal Church
- Date: June 1, 2020
- Time: 7:06–7:11 p.m. EDT
- Venue: Lafayette Square, St. John's Episcopal Church, and Ashburton House
- Location: 38.9003°N 77.0358°W
- Target: Protesters in and around Lafayette Square
- Filmed by: News media, protesters, bystanders
- Participants: U.S. government, news media and protesters

On June 1, 2020, amid the George Floyd protests in Washington, D.C., law enforcement officers used tear gas and other riot control tactics to forcefully clear peaceful protesters from Lafayette Square, creating a path for President Donald Trump and senior administration officials to walk from the White House to St. John's Episcopal Church. Trump held a Bible and posed for a photo op in front of Ashburton House (the church's parish house), which had been defaced by graffiti and damaged by a fire set during protests the night before.

The clearing of demonstrators from Lafayette Square was widely condemned as excessive force and an affront to the First Amendment right to freedom of assembly. Just before visiting the church, Trump delivered a speech in which he urged the governors of U.S. states to quell violent protests by using the National Guard to "dominate the streets," or he would otherwise "deploy the United States military and quickly solve the problem."

Former military leaders, current religious leaders, and elected officials from both major political parties condemned Trump for the event, though some of Trump's fellow Republicans defended the actions. The event was described by The New York Times as "a burst of violence unlike any seen in the shadow of the White House in generations" and possibly one of the defining moments of the Trump presidency. Civil liberties groups filed a federal lawsuit against Trump, U.S. attorney general William Barr, and other federal officials, alleging they violated protesters' constitutional rights. General Mark A. Milley, Chairman of the Joint Chiefs of Staff, later apologized for his role in the photo op.

A June 2021 Interior Department Inspector General review of U.S. Park Police actions found that Park Police did not clear protesters from Lafayette Park for Trump's visit to St. John's Church but as part of a plan to erect fencing. The Park Police incident commander was reportedly stunned when Barr informed him of Trump's impending visit. That report also confirmed the use of tear gas by D.C. Metropolitan Police, revealed Park Police did not request deployment of Bureau of Prisons to the park, and reported that it was not known why U.S. Secret Service had deployed ahead of schedule, advancing on protesters before the Park Police had a chance to warn protesters to disperse. The report also indicated that Park Police commanders could not identify who gave the order to deploy.

== Background ==
On May 25, 2020, George Floyd, a 46-year-old black man, was murdered by white Minneapolis police officer Derek Chauvin, who kept his knee on Floyd's neck for over nine minutes during an arrest. Video of the killing triggered widespread protests and riots across the United States, including protests in Washington D.C., where more than sixty Secret Service agents were injured, and eleven were transported to the hospital from May 29 to 31, 2020.

=== "Law and order" ===
During his presidential campaign, Trump declared himself "the law and order candidate", alluding to a political theme popularized in the late 1960s by George Wallace, Richard Nixon and then-Governor of California Ronald Reagan. He reiterated the theme in his inaugural address: "This American carnage stops right here and stops right now". Following days of domestic unrest in May, Trump returned to the law-and-order message.

On the night of May 28, Trump posted to Twitter, "These THUGS are dishonoring the memory of George Floyd, and I won't let that happen. Just spoke to [Minnesota] Governor Tim Walz and told him that the Military is with him all the way. Any difficulty and we will assume control but, when the looting starts, the shooting starts. Thank you!" The tweet was flagged by Twitter for "glorifying violence". Trump later said he was not advocating violence, noting that the tweet could be read as either a threat or a statement of fact and that the tweet was "spoken as a fact, not as a statement". In a later interview, he stated that he intended for the tweet to be read as "a combination of both". On May 31, Trump tweeted: "LAW & ORDER".

On June 1, invocation of the Insurrection Act to deploy active-duty military forces was discussed in a 10:30 a.m. meeting in the Oval Office and favored by Vice President Mike Pence but opposed by Attorney General William Barr, Chairman of the Joint Chiefs of Staff Mark Milley, and Defense Secretary Mark Esper. Trump stated that the violence made him look "weak" and requested ten-thousand active duty troops be brought to Washington. A senior Pentagon official recalled that Trump said, "We need to get control of the streets. We need 10,000 troops up here [in Washington]. I want it right now." Trump shouted, "None of you have any backbone to stand up to the violence," and asked Milley why soldiers could not shoot protesters. "Can't you just shoot them. Just shoot them in the legs or something." Barr stated that the Insurrection Act was a "break-the-glass-in-case-of-emergency" option and "really not necessary in this situation". Rather, local law enforcement and the National Guard could be used to make a show of force and dominate the streets. Barr indicated he would bring in more federal officers. Esper promised additional National Guardsmen: "We will deploy additional Guard units—five thousand personnel if necessary—into D.C."

Feeling that the local police response had been inadequate, Trump expressed interest in applying the 1973 Home Rule Act to assert temporary federal control of the D.C. Police force. Barr discussed the issue just before 2 p.m. with MPD's chief of police Peter Newsham at the FBI's Strategic Information and Operations Center. Barr recalled telling the chief of police that as long as he could "count on [Newsham] being responsive to federal needs," Barr would not recommend that the government take control of MPD.

On an 11:00 a.m. conference call with U.S. state governors from the White House Situation Room, Trump said, "You have to dominate, if you don't dominate you're wasting your time. They're going to run over you. You're going to look like a bunch of jerks. You have to dominate." Attorney General Barr added that "law enforcement response is not going to work unless we dominate the streets." Defense Secretary Mark Esper said on the call, "we need to dominate the battlespace. You have deep resources in the guard." Secretary Esper was later criticized for using military terms in relation to civil unrest.

Later on June 1, White House aides drafted a proclamation to invoke the act. The Insurrection Act had last been invoked in 1992 at California's request in response to the Rodney King riots, and also been used during the Civil rights movement to enforce school integration and desegregation.

In his Rose Garden speech on June 1 just prior to the photo op, Trump declared, "I am your president of law and order."

=== Bunker visit and reactions ===
On May 29, hundreds of protesters gathered outside the White House. Shortly after 7:00 p.m., multiple protesters crossed temporary barricades near the Treasury Department, about 350 feet (110 m) from the East Wing. The Secret Service placed the White House on lockdown and recommended that Trump and his family move to the Presidential Emergency Operations Center, an underground bunker, which they did. Trump spent almost an hour in the bunker.

The specific security measure was kept secret until reported by The New York Times on May 31. Media coverage reportedly enraged Trump, who felt it gave the impression he was hiding during the protests. In a meeting with Alyssa Farah Griffin and Bill Barr, Trump called for the staffer who leaked the story to be executed. On social media, critics derided Trump as a "coward" with the moniker "Bunker Boy". Trump said he was in the bunker "for a tiny, little short period of time… much more for an inspection" rather than because of any imminent danger. This accounting of events was later contradicted by Attorney General William Barr, who said the May 29 protests "were so bad that the Secret Service recommended that the President go down to the bunker". Trump's displeasure over the coverage reportedly led to his decision to stage a photo op at St. John's Church.

=== Ashburton House fire ===
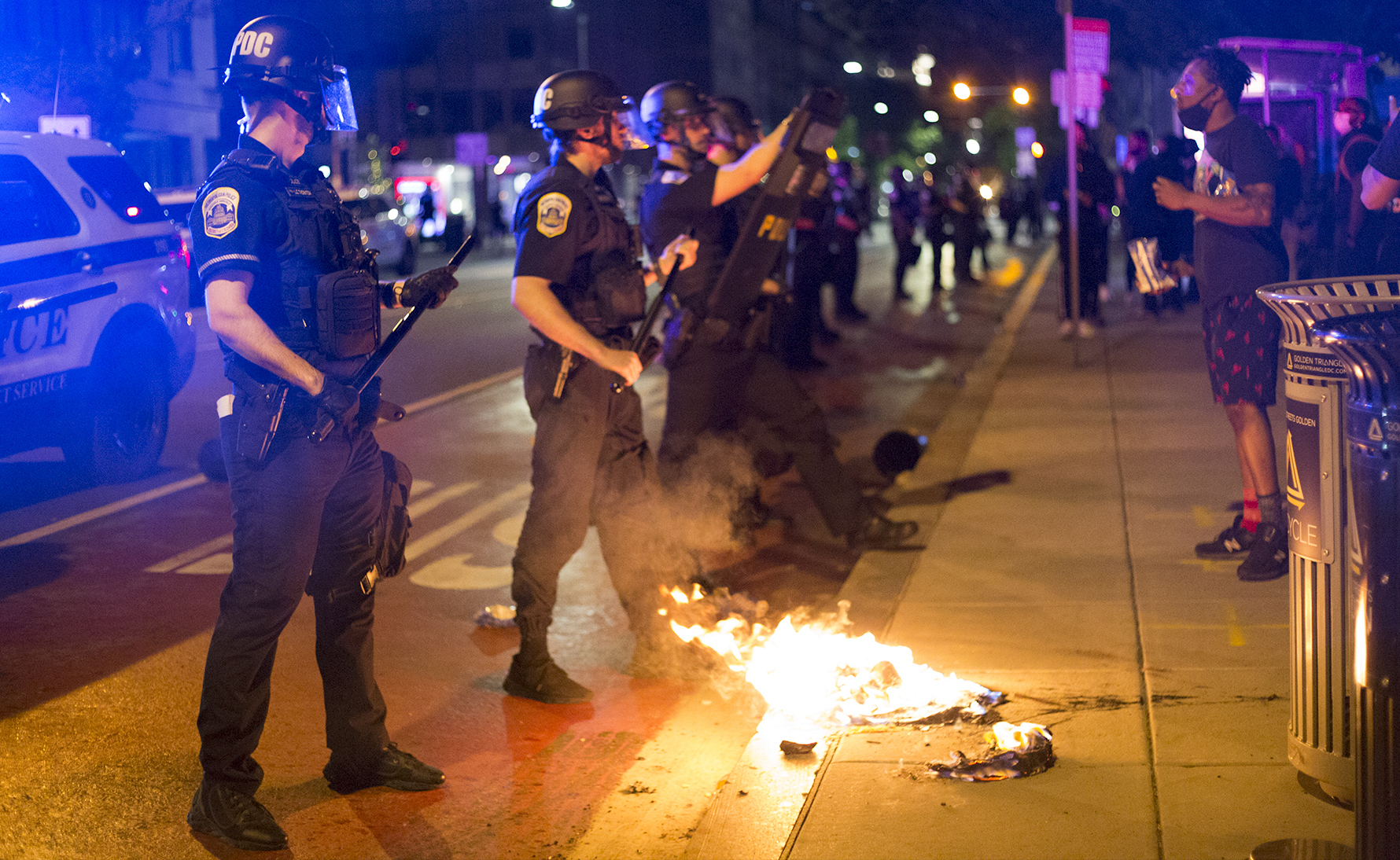
Police form line in the street during protests in D.C. on the night of May 31.

Several fires were lit during protests in Washington on the night of May 31, including one in the basement of Ashburton House, the parish house of St. John's Episcopal Church. The fire was isolated to the church nursery and quickly extinguished by firefighters. According to the church's rector, Reverend Rob Fisher, during the protests "a fire was lit in the nursery, in the basement of Ashburton House". Fisher wrote that the fire was small, wrecking the nursery room but leaving the rest of the church and parish house untouched, except by graffiti which had been quickly fixed. Trump later claimed that "the church was badly hurt" and retweeted a false claim that the church "was firebombed by terrorists".

=== Security perimeter ===
Following violent protests in D.C. on May 29, planning began on an expansion of the White House security perimeter. On May 30, the National Park Service closed Lafayette Park and installed bike-rack fencing along the north side of the park. Discussions began between the U.S. Park Police and Secret Service to establish a more secure perimeter that would include anti-scale fencing.

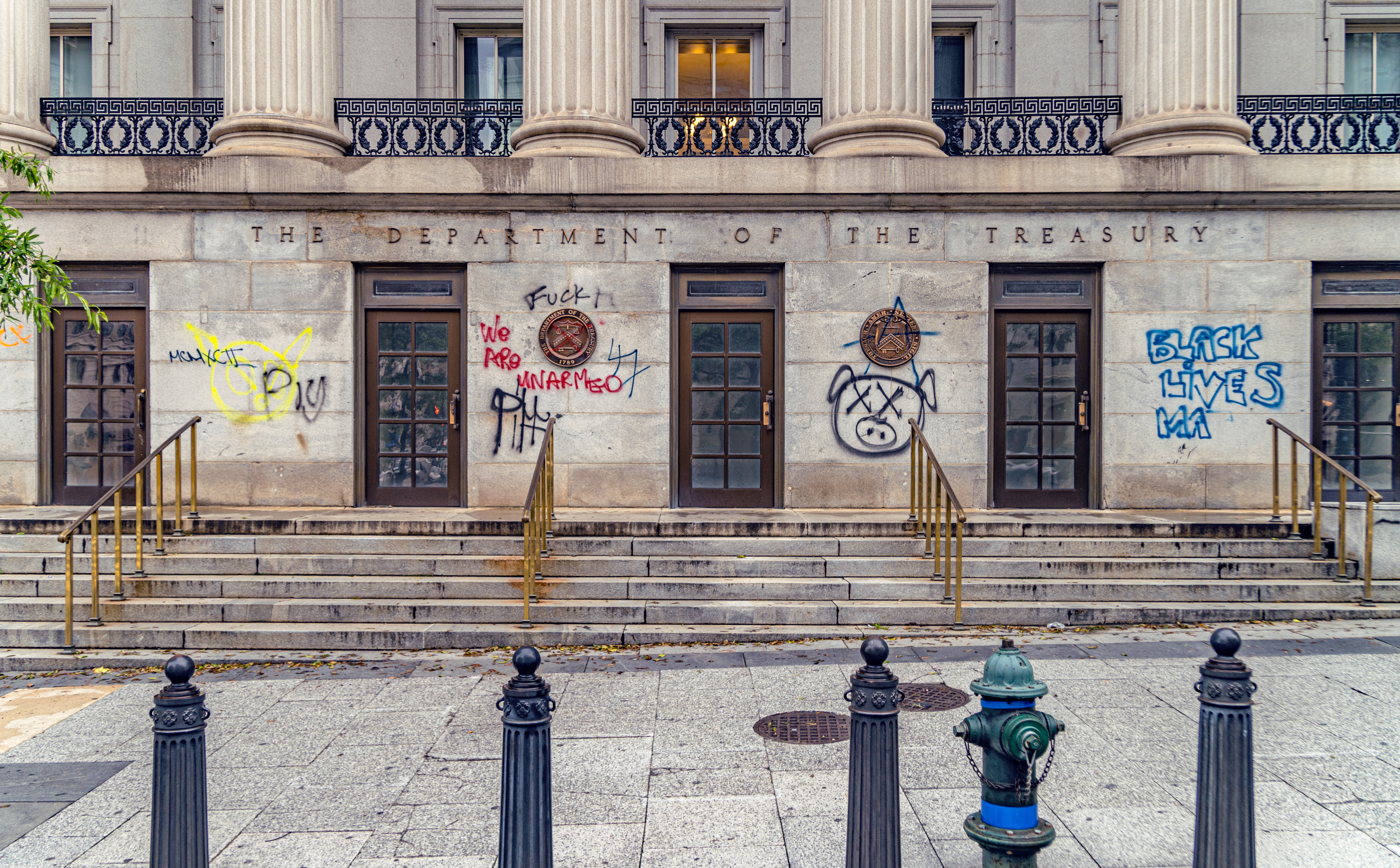
Graffiti on the exterior of the Treasury Department

According to a Justice Department spokesman, "Trump directed Barr to 'lead federal law enforcement efforts to assist in the restoration of order to the District of Columbia'." On May 31, Barr ordered the Federal Bureau of Investigation (FBI) to deploy its Hostage Rescue Team to the streets by midnight. The federal response resulted in all Homeland Security Investigations agents in the area being told just before noon on June 1 to prepare to assist with handling protests. All the federal officers newly stationed to D.C. had volunteered for the opportunity, said the president of the Federal Law Enforcement Officers Association.

During the overnight demonstrations on May 31, fires were lit in the basement of St. John's parish house, the Park Service's restroom in Lafayette Park, and at the nearby AFL–CIO building. On June 1, the decision was made to install anti-scale fencing at the park. Although the decision to extend the perimeter to allow for fence installation had been made that morning, it had not been carried out by the afternoon, surprising Barr, who had entered Lafayette Park to check on conditions. He then ordered the perimeter expanded. A member of the D.C. National Guard reported he had personally informed Barr that the crowd was peaceful.

=== Photo op preparations ===
According to The New York Times, on the morning of June 1, Trump's advisors told him that allowing protesters and unrest on the streets of the capital was not symbolically acceptable. In the book I Alone Can Fix It, Carol Leonnig and Philip Rucker say it was the president's daughter Ivanka Trump who came up with the idea that her father should give a "law and order" speech in the Rose Garden, then walk to St. John's Church. She was joined by her husband and Senior Advisor to the President Jared Kushner, White House Chief of Staff Mark Meadows, and Counselor to the President Hope Hicks in promoting the idea. Ivanka suggested that he "walk to the church, go inside, say a prayer". Hicks advised him to do more, such as reading from scripture or visiting with faith leaders. Trump reportedly vetoed those ideas, saying he would simply hold up a Bible.

== Timeline ==
1 White House Rose Garden
2 Lafayette Square
3 St. John's Episcopal Church
4 Ashburton House

On May 30, U.S. Park Police (USPP) and U.S. Secret Service decide to "establish a more secure perimeter around Lafayette Park and discussed procuring an antiscale fence", according to the Interior OIG report.

Occurring on June 1, all times given in Eastern Time:

- 12:00 p.m.: Secret Service tells a fencing contractor to proceed with installing fencing at Lafayette Park, according to the Interior OIG report.
- 4:50 p.m.: Secret Service informs the USPP incident commander that Trump would make an unscheduled visit to Lafayette Park later in the day, according to the USPP acting chief.
- 5:05 p.m.: A convoy of nine trucks carrying uniformed National Guard troops enters the White House complex.
- 5:30 p.m.: By this time, three trucks holding fencing material have arrived at the area.
- 5:50 p.m.: The Park Police incident commander informs the Park Police Horse Mounted Patrol unit, the Park Police civil disturbance unit, and the Arlington County Police Department civil disturbance unit to prepare to deploy to H Street.
- 6:04 p.m.: White House communications office notifies reporters about a "6:15 news briefing in the Rose Garden". USPP incident commander drafts park dispersal warning.
- 6:08 p.m.: Law enforcement and military personnel begin massing before protesters at the north side of Lafayette Park. They include members of the Uniformed Secret Service, D.C. National Guard, and Park Police.
- 6:08 p.m.: Attorney General William Barr is seen in Lafayette Park reviewing protesters and law enforcement.
- 6:10 p.m.: Around this time, Barr speaks to the Park Police operations commander. According to the Interior Inspector General report, the Park Police operations commander stated that Barr "asked him why the crowd was still on H Street and said he thought they would be gone by that point", to which the Park Police operations commander said that Park Police "were getting into position to move the crowd". Barr proceeds to ask: "Are these people still going to be here when POTUS comes out?" The Park Police operations commander said he replied: "Are you freaking kidding me?"
- 6:12 p.m.: The Metropolitan Police Department assistant chief asks the Park Police incident commander to delay the clearing operation until 7 p.m., when the curfew would take effect but the Park Police incident commander refused.
- 6:15 p.m.: General Mark Milley, Chairman of the Joint Chiefs of Staff, appears in the park behind the police barricade.
- 6:16 p.m.: Secret Service, contrary to the operational plan, begin moving into H Street prior to any dispersal orders being given to the crowd. The early deployment increased tension between law enforcement and the protesters. They meet significant resistance and eggs and bottles were thrown. They use pepper spray in response. Some security personnel kneel to put on gas masks. This is misinterpreted by some protesters as a sign of solidarity; they start cheering. A D.C. police channel announces that "CS gas", a type of tear gas, may soon be deployed.
- 6:17 p.m.: Before Park Police initiated their plan to warn protesters to disperse, agents of the Secret Service advance on protesters at the northeast corner of the park at H Street and Madison Place. After briefly occupying the intersection, they fall back. The Secret Service officer responsible for the early deployment apologized but offered no explanation for the change in timing.
- 6:21 p.m.: A person on a law enforcement communications channel says, "John, can you just confirm when you have all the grenadiers and shields with you."
- 6:22 p.m.: Barr and Milley leave Lafayette Square.
- 6:23 p.m.: Park Police make the first of three announcements directing protesters to leave. The announcement (Note: "Attention. This is [the incident commander] with the United States Park Police. For safety and security reasons, Lafayette Park and H Street are closed to pedestrians. You are ordered to depart the area immediately.") is largely unintelligible even to protesters at the front of the crowd. Two additional announcements were made at 6:26 p.m. and 6:28 p.m. About 1 minute before the final warning was completed, Park Police units deployed contrary to the operational plan. Park Police commanders could not identify who gave the order to deploy.
- 6:26 p.m.: D.C. Police radio announces that police action is about to take place and that D.C. Police are to hold their positions on 16th Street.
- 6:28 p.m.: Park Police notify Arlington County Police via radio that "level one's been activated", referring to a policing tactic to quell violent unrest by charging crowds to disperse them without making physical contact. Police and National Guard military police, wearing gas masks and riot gear advance to the barricade on the North side of Lafayette Park. At least one protester throws water bottles and is reprimanded by another protester. The Secret Service and Park Police begin to push protesters at the northeast corner of the park up Vermont Avenue as Park Police mounted on horses appear behind them.
- 6:32 p.m.: Arlington Police radio says, "Moving forward to the intersection, forward to the intersection. Go, go, go," in reference to the largest group of protesters on H Street. The protesters retreat, evacuating H Street between 16th Street NW and Vermont Ave in front of the advancing security forces. Police with riot shields enter the patio of St. John's Episcopal Church and physically push out a group of clergy and volunteers, leaving the police in control of the front of St John's Church.
- 6:34 p.m.: Arlington Police radio says, "We're gonna take 16th Street on this next surge."
- 6:35 p.m.: Park police on H Street rush protesters at the intersection of H Street and 16th Street. A chemical grenade is rolled at the feet of protesters.
- 6:36 p.m.: Park police push protesters west on H Street past 16th Street. Video records several members of the Park Police SWAT team and the Bureau of Prisons Special Operations Response Team firing pepper balls at the fleeing crowd. The Washington Post reported that a member of the Park Police SWAT team threw a stingball grenade containing rubber pellets into the crowd.
- 6:39 p.m.: A Park Police SWAT officer rolls a white smoke grenade into the crowd.
- 6:42 p.m.: Arlington Police radio says, "We are going all the way to I Street. Copy, I Street." A line of mounted Park Police officers moves forward to disperse the crowd.
- 6:43 p.m.: Trump begins speaking in the White House Rose Garden.
- About 6:45 p.m.: Protesters are forced south along 17th Street. Several CS gas grenades are deployed by the Metropolitan Police Department on 17th Street between H Street and Pennsylvania Avenue.
- 6:50 p.m.: Trump concludes his speech, saying, "Thank you very much, and now I am going to pay my respects to a very, very special place."
- 7:00 p.m.: The curfew previously announced by D.C. Mayor Muriel Bowser goes into effect.
- 7:01 p.m.: The president begins walking with a group of White House officials and a security detail from the White House complex to St. John's Church.
- 7:06 p.m.: Trump arrives at the Parish House of St. John's Church, where he spends several minutes posing for photographs on the church grounds, first alone and then with his entourage.
- 7:11 p.m.: Trump and his entourage leave the church grounds.
- 7:18 p.m.: Trump and his entourage arrive back at the White House.
- 7:30 p.m.: Construction begins on new eight-foot (2.4 m) black fence around Lafayette Park and along 17th Street at Pennsylvania Avenue restricting public access.
- 10:00 p.m.: Helicopters disperse crowds that had reformed in violation of the curfew.

== Clearing Lafayette Square and St. John's ==
External videos
- Timeline of events, The Washington Post
- Full video of protest, Reuters

Minutes before a speech by Trump in the White House Rose Garden, hundreds of officers in riot gear rapidly advanced on the protesters at the direction of Attorney General William Barr. Officers used chemical irritants (Note: The Metropolitan Police Department (MPD) deployed CS gas on 17th Street. The U.S. Park Police (USPP) did not use CS gas, but acknowledged using smoke canisters and pepper balls. Pepper balls are projectiles classified by the CDC as a type of tear gas. Video of the event appears to show a USPP officer throwing a sting ball grenade. One such grenade containing OC gas was later recovered. USPP has not denied using the device as denials were specific to "CS and CN" gas and "OC Skat Shells".) (including tear gas and pepper balls), sting ball grenades, flash grenades, smoke canisters, rubber bullets, riot shields, and batons to disperse the crowd.

Dispersing protesters ahead of President Trump's visit to St. John's Church (in Spanish)

A number of law enforcement agencies were involved, including the U.S. Park Police (USPP), U.S. Secret Service, Metropolitan Police Department (MPD), D.C. National Guard, Federal Bureau of Prisons, Arlington County Police Department (ACPD), U.S. Marshals, Drug Enforcement Administration (DEA), Federal Bureau of Investigation (FBI), and Bureau of Alcohol, Tobacco, Firearms and Explosives (ATF). National Guard members were present but did not participate in clearing protesters.

At 6:16 p.m., before any dispersal orders were given to protesters, the Secret Service entered H Street from Madison Place and began pushing back protesters. The Secret Service later apologized for this but did not explain why it had happened. USPP and ACPD officers began clearing the area around 6:28 p.m., a half hour ahead of the previously announced 7:00 p.m. city curfew, prior to completing dispersal warnings to the crowd, and despite specific requests from the D.C. Police Assistant Chief to delay the operation.

Police were pushing clergy and church volunteers off the patio of St. John's Church by 6:30 p.m. Police on foot and mounted police on horses began moving the crowd west along H Street, towards Connecticut Avenue by 6:35 p.m.

U.S. Park Police issued a statement claiming that "at approximately 6:33 p.m., violent protestors on H Street NW began throwing projectiles including bricks, frozen water bottles, and caustic liquids." The claim was disputed by multiple reporters and video taken at the scene. No U.S. Park Police officers reported injuries on June 1, 2020, until after the operation to disperse began, with one officer suffering a facial laceration and another who was kicked in the groin. An Army National Guard major who testified later said that "demonstrators were behaving peacefully". "More than a half-dozen officials from federal law enforcement, D.C. public safety agencies and the National Guard who were familiar with planning for protests" told The Washington Post that "they had no warning that U.S. Park Police, the agency that commanded the operation, planned to move the perimeter — and protesters — before a 7:00 p.m. citywide curfew, or that force would be used."

A Washington Post review of videos taken at the scene did not find evidence of these items being thrown. Some protesters threw eggs, candy, and water bottles at police. Journalists who were on the scene also reported that the demonstration was peaceful. Jonathan Allen of NBC News wrote: "no one was threatening the police. It was an entirely peaceful protest, the kind that occurs in Washington without incident, seemingly every day." A CNN team recorded no projectiles thrown at police, reporting that, as police began to clear the square, "demonstrators were hit by projectiles and began to cough and choke." Garrett Haake of NBC News wrote, "there was no object-throwing before the mounted park police moved in."

During a live report for the Australian morning show Sunrise, journalist Amelia Brace and cameraman Timothy Myers were assaulted by a charging police line. Brace was clubbed with a police baton and Myers was hit in the chest with the edge of a riot shield and then punched, as they covered protests near the White House. Brace said she and Myers were also shot by rubber bullets. Brace said at the time: "You heard us yelling there that we were media but they don't care, they are being indiscriminate at the moment." In response, the Australian Prime Minister Scott Morrison announced Australia would launch an investigation into the incident.

Reverend Gini Gerbasi, the rector of St. John's Episcopal Church, Georgetown, said that despite some tense moments the crowd was calm and peaceful until the police advanced. She had helped organize more than twenty priests and lay volunteers to provide water, food, and hand sanitizer as a "peaceful presence in support of protesters". They were packing up before the 7:00 p.m. curfew when armed riot police entered the churchyard and expelled them. Gerbasi found herself coughing from tear gas, while other people around her were hit with non-lethal projectiles, and they were forced from the churchyard by police carrying riot shields.

== White House speech ==
External videos
- Donald Trump speech on FOX News
- Donald Trump speech on NBC

While law enforcement continued to clear protesters from nearby streets and with smoke still drifting in the air, Trump emerged to give a speech in the White House Rose Garden, where he said, "I am your president of law and order and an ally of all peaceful protesters." Law enforcement munitions could be heard in the background during the speech. Some news networks showed the speech and the police actions simultaneously, in a split screen described as "surreal".

Regarding violent protests in the United States, Trump urged state governors to use the National Guard "in sufficient numbers that we dominate the streets". If cities or states fail to respond adequately, he said he would "deploy the United States military and quickly solve the problem for them". Regarding D.C., Trump stated, "As we speak, I am dispatching thousands and thousands of heavily armed soldiers, military personnel, and law enforcement officers to stop the rioting, looting, vandalism, assaults, and the wanton destruction of property."

Trump concluded his speech by saying: "Now I am going to pay my respects to a very, very special place."

== Participants ==
External videos
- Walk to St. John's Church, C-SPAN

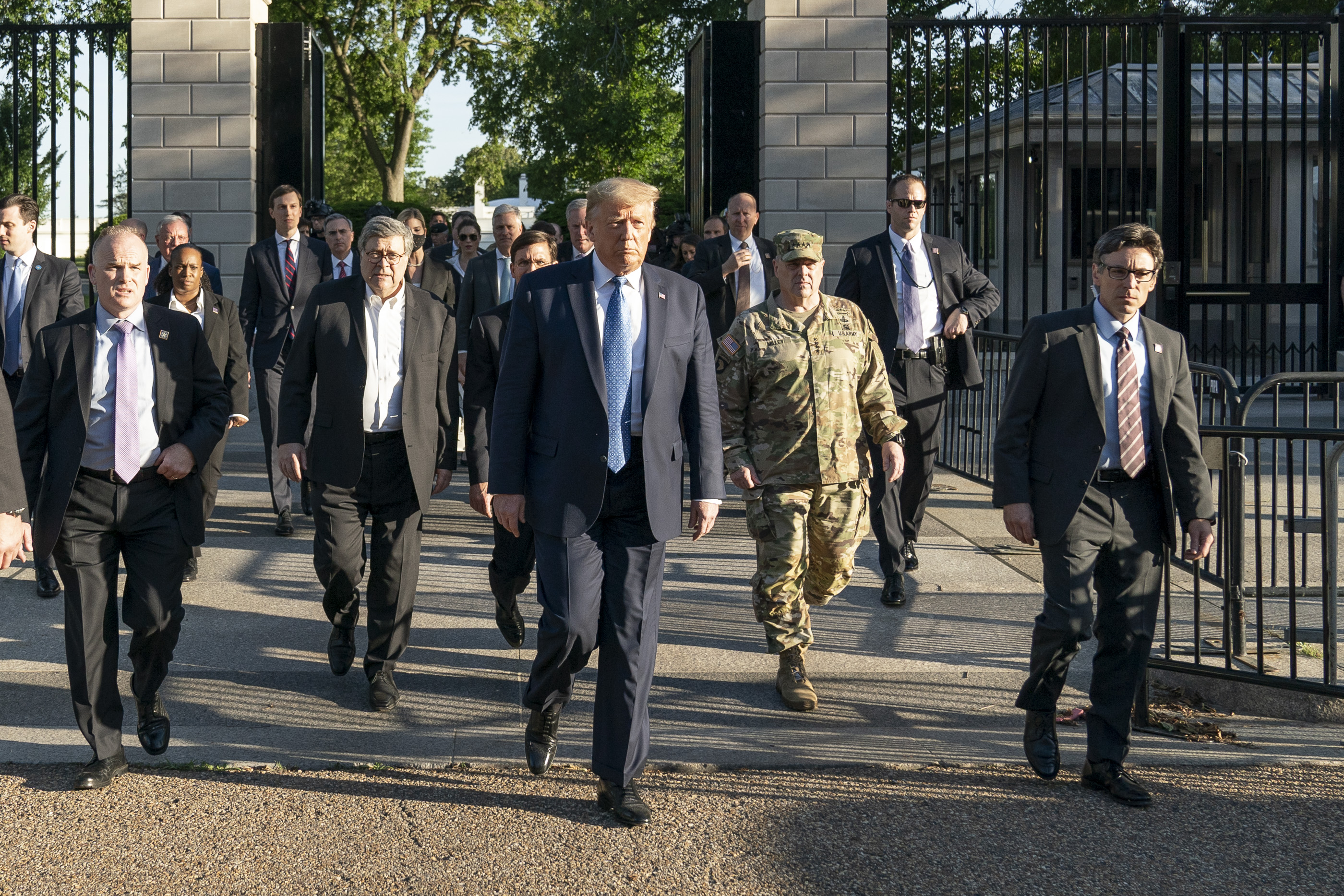

Flanked by Secret Service agents, the president walked with a group of senior officials and advisors from the White House complex to St. John's Church. The group included:

- William Barr,
  Attorney General
- Pat Cipollone,
  Counsel
- Mark Esper,
  Defense Secretary
- Alyssa Farah,
  Director of Strategic Communications
- Hope Hicks,
  Counselor to the President
- Keith Kellogg,
  National Security Advisor to the VP
- Jared Kushner,
  Senior Advisor
- Nick Luna,
  Assistant to the President
- Derek Lyons,
  Staff Secretary
- Kayleigh McEnany,
  Press Secretary
- Mark Meadows,
  Chief of Staff
- Stephen Miller,
  Senior Advisor
- Mark Milley,
  Chairman of the Joint Chiefs of Staff
- Robert O'Brien,
  National Security Advisor
- Anthony M. Ornato,
  Deputy Chief of Staff
- Dan Scavino,
  Deputy Chief of Staff
- Ivanka Trump,
  Senior Advisor

== Appearance at the church ==
External videos
- Trump at St. John's Church, NBC

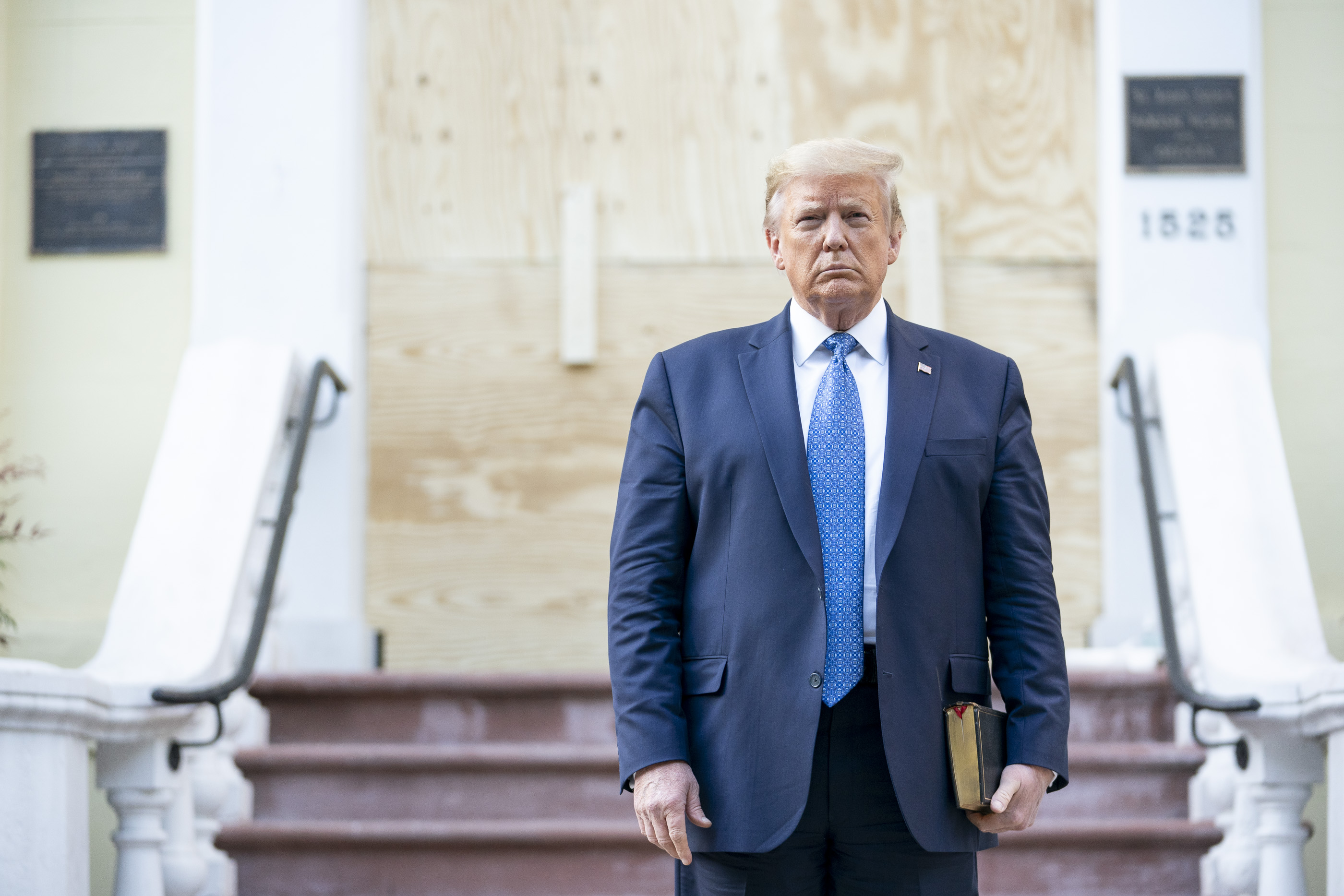
President Trump at the door of Ashburton House, St. John's Church Parish House, June 1, 2020

Following a five-minute walk from the White House, Trump arrived at St. John's Church at 7:06 p.m. His daughter, Ivanka, handed him a Bible which she carried there in her handbag. Trump turned the Bible over, and held it aloft as he stood in front of Ashburton House beside the church noticeboard. A reporter asked "Is that your Bible?" and Trump replied, "It's a Bible." Trump made no formal remarks. When asked if he had any thoughts, Trump said, "We have a great country. That's my thoughts. Greatest country in the world. We will make it greater. We will make it even greater. It won't take long. It's not going to take long. You see what's going on. You see it coming back."

Trump first posed alone with the Bible, while standing in front of the church's noticeboard, which stated: "All are welcome". He then spent "several minutes posing for photos alone and with other officials", including Barr, O'Brien, Meadows, Esper, and McEnany. The New York Times reported that Trump "made no pretense of any intent other than posing for photographs—he held up the Bible carried by his daughter, then gathered a few top advisers next to him in a line". The entire group then departed the church grounds at 7:11 p.m. and returned to the White House at 7:18 p.m.

Trump did not enter the church during this appearance. It was his third visit to the church since being elected president. There were viral social media claims and news reports that Trump had held the Bible upside down during the photo op, but these were untrue. However, the Bible version Trump held up was a Revised Standard Version, which is not endorsed by some evangelical Christians (a large portion of Trump's political base), due in part to translations like that in Isaiah 7:14, where Hebrew: עַלְמָה, romanized: almah is rendered "young woman" rather than "virgin" — which to evangelicals questions the prophecy of the miracle of the Incarnation.

== Aftermath ==
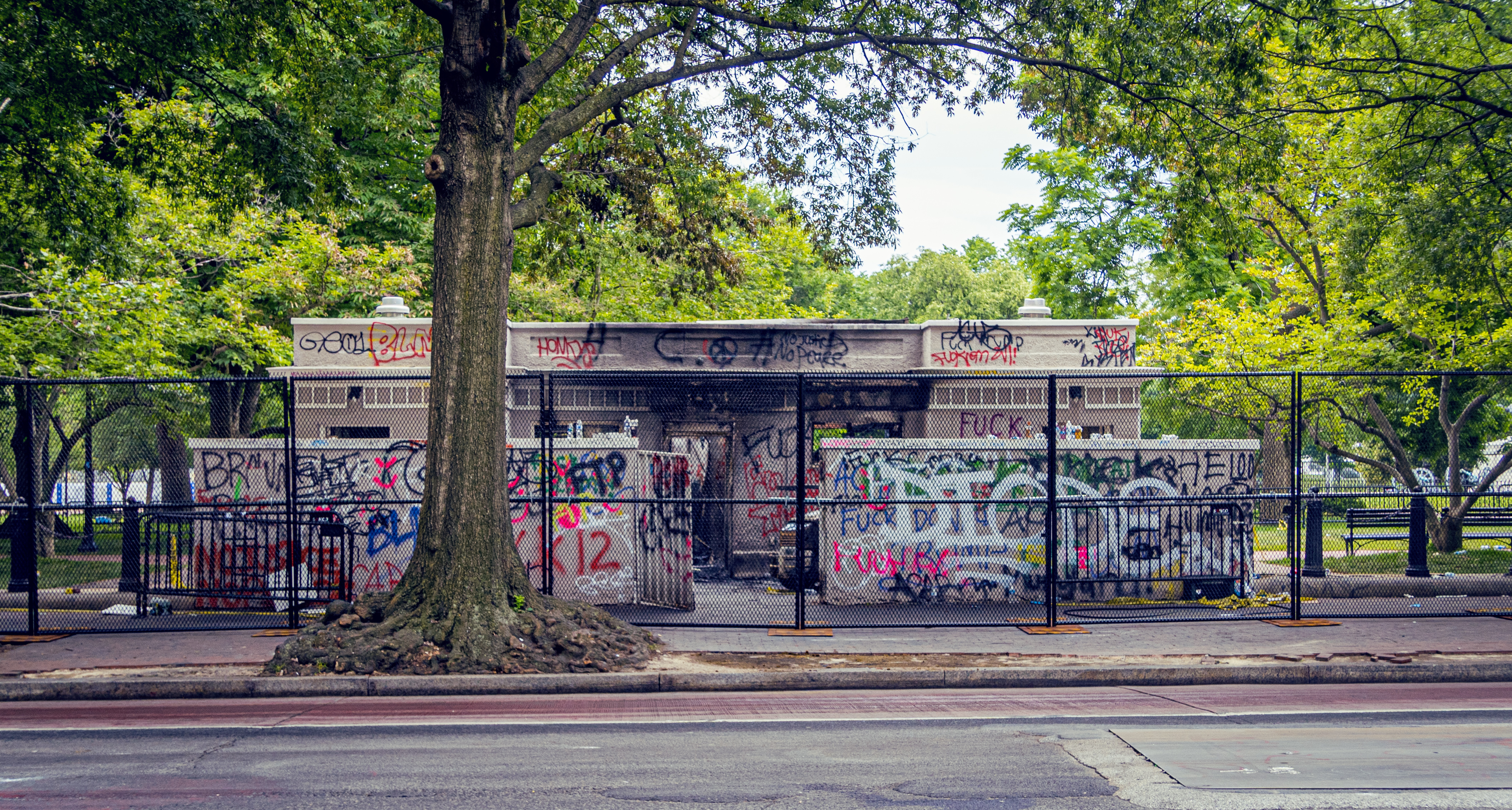
Tall fence on northern edge of Lafayette Square, erected on June 2, with restroom damaged on May 31

The following morning, June 2, a tall fence was put up on the northern edge of Lafayette Square, and by June 4 "all entrances to Lafayette Park, the Ellipse and other open spaces around the White House" had been blocked off with fencing and concrete barriers.

=== Subsequent demonstrations ===
A crowd of demonstrators triple the size of the previous day peacefully demonstrated the next day.

By the afternoon of June 3, protesters "found themselves pushed almost a full street farther back from the White House" with two large military vehicles across 16th Street NW entirely blocking Lafayette Square and rows of officers with riot gear and crowd-control munitions stationed in front of the vehicles.

On June 11, temporary fencing around Lafayette Park was dismantled and the park reopened. On June 24, the fencing was put up again and stayed up until May 2021.

=== Active-duty military ===
In his June 1 speech, Trump encouraged governors to use the National Guard in sufficient numbers to "dominate the streets" and promised to "deploy the military" if necessary to restore order.

On June 1 and 2, about 1,700 active-duty U.S. military troops from Fort Bragg, Fort Drum, and Fort Riley were positioned at military installations in the capital area including Fort Belvoir and Fort Myer in Virginia and Joint Base Andrews in Maryland. No active-duty forces were deployed inside Washington, D.C.

At a Pentagon press conference on June 3, Defense Secretary Mark Esper declared his opposition to using active-duty military to quell domestic unrest: "The option to use active-duty forces in a law enforcement role should only be used as a matter of last resort, and only in the most urgent and dire of situations. We are not in one of those situations now. I do not support invoking the Insurrection Act." Esper faced criticism earlier in the week for using the term "dominate the battlespace" in reference to how National Guard resources could be used.

On June 3, Army Secretary Ryan McCarthy ordered the return of some active duty troops to their home bases. The order was overturned by Esper after a White House meeting later that day. But the following day, Esper ordered the move to proceed and 700 troops from the 82nd Airborne were sent back to North Carolina. By June 5, the Pentagon had ordered all active-duty military to return to their home bases.

The active duty troops stationed in the capital area complemented roughly 5,400 guardsmen from D.C. and 11 other states, including Florida, Idaho, Indiana, Maryland, Missouri, Mississippi, New Jersey, Ohio, South Carolina, Tennessee, and Utah. Governors of Virginia, New York, Pennsylvania, and Delaware declined requests to send National Guard troops from their states to the District of Columbia.

=== Use of tear gas and tools for crowd dispersal ===
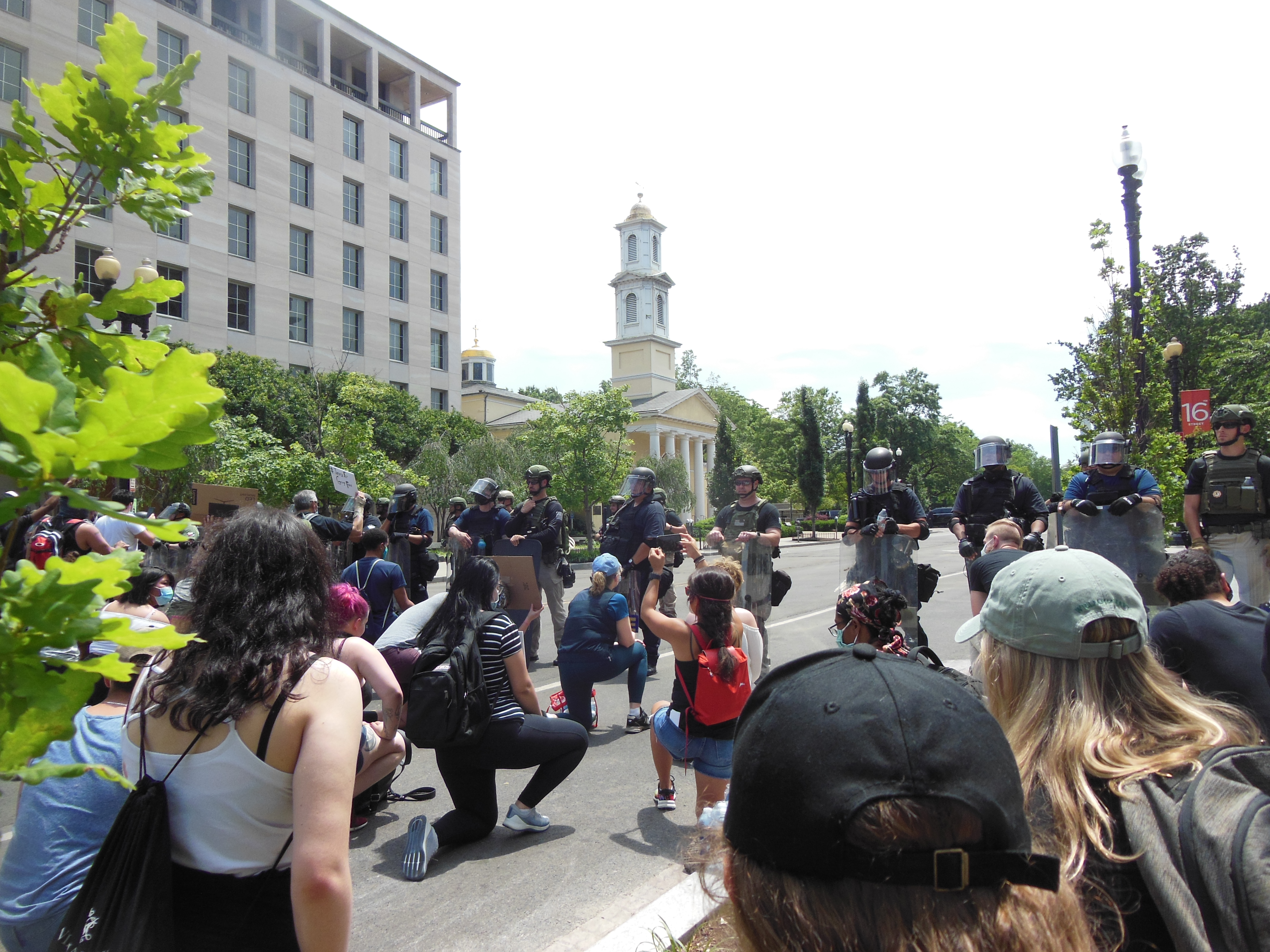
Federal law enforcement cordon extended north along 16th St NW past the church, June 3.

Numerous eyewitness accounts and news reporters indicated that tear gas was used to disperse protesters in Lafayette Square.

WUSA9 reporters on scene "witnessed canisters venting out green-colored gas" and then collected several spent canisters. According to WUSA9, the canisters "were not from a previous day", because they "were in the middle of the street undisturbed, and in one case, still slightly warm to the touch", and also because the WUSA9 journalists were the first people on the scene "immediately after" the police departed. The canisters were labelled SPEDE-HEAT CS and SKAT SHELL OC. WUSA9 reporters also recovered a fragment of a Stinger OC Grenade, which releases OC gas and blasts rubber pellets out in a 50-foot (15.2 m) radius. OC is short for oleoresin capsicum, a chemical irritant found in peppers, which activates the TRPV1 pain receptor and produces tears in humans. CS gas, which is commonly known as tear gas, activates the TRPA1 receptor and is more toxic than OC, but similarly it also produces tears in humans.

A video of the event shows at least one law enforcement officer with an OC canister strapped to his vest. Video of the officers' advance shows a law enforcement officer throwing at protesters an object that The Washington Post identified as a sting-ball grenade.

Despite this evidence, U.S. Park Police officials said, "USPP officers and other assisting law enforcement partners did not use tear gas or OC Skat Shells to close the area at Lafayette Park", adding that they only used "pepper balls" and "smoke canisters". But in a June 5 interview, U.S. Park Police spokesperson Sgt. Eduardo Delgado called it a "mistake" to insist "tear gas" was not used, as the pepper balls used by Park Police would also cause tears. Delgado said the initial decision to deny that "tear gas" was used was due to Park Police assuming "people would think [of] CS or CN", which are two common examples of tear gas. In sworn Congressional testimony on July 28, Monohan reiterated that CS gas was not used but when asked about the use of other "chemical agents", Monohan noted the USPP's use of sting ball grenades, which can contain chemical irritants. One such grenade containing OC gas was recovered at the scene.

Attorney General William Barr and officials with several law enforcement agencies also denied using tear gas. In an interview with CBS News, Barr reiterated "there was no tear gas used" on June 1. "The tear gas was used Sunday [May 31] when they had to clear H Street to allow the fire department to come in to save St. John's Church. That's when tear gas was used."

Donald Trump's presidential campaign demanded news outlets retract reports of "tear gas" use. Trump called the reports "fake" and said "they didn't use tear gas."

Fact checkers from the Associated Press, CNN, FactCheck.org, and Politifact reported on this issue. The specific compound which the Park Police denied using is CS, a traditional tear gas. "Tear gas", however, is a broad term for a group of chemicals known for being riot control agents, e.g. PAVA in the pepper balls that USPP acknowledge using. The sources for this broad definition are the U.S. Centers for Disease Control (CDC), Scientific American, and the Handbook of Toxicology of Chemical Warfare Agents. Thus the fact checkers reported that the difference between pepper spray and traditional tear gas compounds is only semantics, because the practical effect is the same: chemically irritated eyes, throats, and other areas.

On June 13, 2020, U.S. Secret Service officials issued a correction stating that one employee had used OC spray "in response to an assaultive individual".

In June 2021, after initially refusing to confirm whether it had used tear gas munitions, the Metropolitan Police Department (MPD) admitted in court filings (in a litigation brought by protesters and the ACLU) that the MPD had used tear gas against protesters on June 1. An MPD lawyer asserted that the department's use of tear gas was reasonable and that because the MPD "did not target specific protesters" the department did not violate the constitutional rights of any individual. In a report issued by the Office of the Inspector General for the Department of the Interior, MPD confirmed that it used CS gas on 17th Street. The use of the chemical irritant surprised the Park Police, as the Park Police incident commander had not authorized the use of CS gas.

=== Australian response to attack on Australian journalists ===
While dispersing demonstrators, two U.S. Park Police officers attacked a news crew from Seven Network, a major Australian media outlet. Cameraman Timothy Myers was hit with a riot shield and punched by police, while a different officer attempted to attack reporter Amelia Brace with a baton as she fled. Both Myers and Brace were also shot with rubber bullets and attacked with tear gas. The police actions were criticized by both Australian Prime Minister Scott Morrison and Opposition Leader Anthony Albanese. Morrison said the event was "troubling" and directed the Australian Embassy to investigate and to express "strong concerns" to U.S. authorities. The Media, Entertainment and Arts Alliance, which represents Australian journalists, submitted a letter to the U.S. Ambassador to Australia protesting the attack. A Network Seven spokesman said the attack against Myers and Brace was "nothing short of wanton thuggery". U.S. Park Police officials said the officers had been assigned to administrative duties pending investigation of the attack. According to the Government Accountability Office, in a report to Congressional requesters, the incident was referred to the OIG and an investigation was ongoing as of August 2021. Since then, no relevant report has appeared on the OIG website.

== Investigations and hearings ==
=== Helicopters and subsequent investigation ===
Pentagon officials directed National Guard helicopters to use a "persistent presence" to disperse protesters. Helicopters, including a twin-engine UH-60 Black Hawk and UH-72 Lakota, were observed in a very low-flying show of force over protesters who gathered later in the evening. Experts said that the maneuvers, including rotor wash that sends debris flying, presented risks to the pilots, the crew, and persons on the ground. The Washington Post reported that "one helicopter buzzed protesters from a height nearly level with three- and four-story buildings in the Chinatown area, ripping tree limbs away [and the] rotor wash hurled glass from broken windows like shrapnel." FAA flight data showed that one helicopter hovered below 100 feet (30 m) near a crowd by Capital One Arena. The use of a helicopter with Red Cross markings for a law enforcement action was also criticized. Misuse of the Red Cross symbol is prohibited by the First Geneva Convention.

In June 2020, the commander of the District of Columbia National Guard, Major General William J. Walker, announced an investigation into the use of the medevac helicopter. The crew of the UH-72 was grounded during the investigation.

A report by the U.S. Department of Defense Inspector General issued on January 22, 2021, found that aircrews lacked clear orders to guide them on their mission, with some helicopter crews believing that their mission was to observe, and others believing their mission was to deter and disperse the crowd. The report found no law prohibiting the use of the medevac helicopter. The Army said that an unspecified number of personnel had been given "administrative discipline" for "performance shortcomings" (but not misconduct). The report recommended improved planning, training, and oversight of the use of aircraft during civil unrest. Although Walker, the D.C. National Guard commander, initially concluded that the use of a medical helicopter was inappropriate, the subsequent higher-level review concluded that there was no law prohibiting it. The Army said that it has changed its policy, noting that since the June 2020 incident, no Army helicopters had been deployed to public events in the capital.

=== Lawsuits ===
Observers raised concerns that the police action violated rights guaranteed by the First Amendment to the United States Constitution, which reads, "Congress shall make no law respecting an establishment of religion, or prohibiting the free exercise thereof; or abridging the freedom of speech, or of the press; or the right of the people peaceably to assemble, and to petition the Government for a redress of grievances."

Three days after protesters were forcibly removed from Lafayette Square, a group of protesters and Black Lives Matter D.C., represented by the American Civil Liberties Union (ACLU) and Lawyers' Committee for Civil Rights Under Law, filed a federal lawsuit against Trump and Barr, claiming they conspired to violate, and did violate, their constitutional rights under the First and Fourth Amendments. Other officials, including Defense Secretary Mark Esper and Secret Service Director James M. Murray, were also named as defendants. A second lawsuit, filed by three protesters in June 2020 against law enforcement and Trump administration officials asserting that June 1 events represented a "gross abuse of executive power" that violated their First, Fourth and Fifth Amendment rights.

In May 2021, lawyers for the Justice Department asked the district court to dismiss four lawsuits against Trump, Barr, and other officials, claiming immunity "from civil lawsuits over police actions taken to protect a president and to secure his movements" and citing a 2004 Supreme Court decision that upheld qualified immunity for two Secret Service officers who had moved protesters away from the president—applied in the case of Barr. The government argued that the security of a president's movements was a "paramount" interest. The attorneys for the plaintiffs opposed the motions, arguing that security was "the latest in a series of 'shifting explanations' after-the-fact" and that acceptance of the argument would "authorize brutality with impunity."

In June 2021, U.S. District Judge Dabney L. Friedrich, a Trump appointee, issued an order in the four cases. The order narrowed the case, dismissing most claims against Trump, Barr, and Gregory T. Monahan (who was at the time of the Lafayette Square incident the acting chief of the Park Police). Friedrich ruled that Trump, Barr, and Monahan, as federal officials, had qualified immunity from civil suits from damages, and that Black Lives Matter D.C. (one of the plaintiffs) could not show it was directly injured by the defendants' conduct. Friedrich also ruled that the plaintiffs' civil-rights and civil-conspiracy claims against the federal officials were "too speculative" to proceed. Friedrich allowed the other claims to go forward, including plaintiffs' claims against D.C. police and Arlington County police, and the plaintiffs' challenges to federal restrictions on First Amendment activity at Lafayette Square. The ACLU criticized the partial dismissals, and is appealing.

=== Congressional hearings ===
Congress investigated the tactics used in clearing of the park. The House Natural Resource Committee held hearings on June 29, July 28, and July 29, 2020. The House Armed Services Committee held a hearing of the full committee on July 9, 2020.

The full House Natural Resource Committee heard testimony from a protester, journalist, church leader, and law professor Jonathan Turley of George Washington University Law School on June 29, 2020. Turley noted in his testimony that the Park Police had argued they were creating a perimeter to establish a new fence line on H Street but protesters were pushed back to I Street, "which is beyond the fence line". He notes this "would warrant congressional review ... of how far those protesters were pushed back and why".

The U.S. Park Police stated on July 7 that "the radio recorder was not working and did not record any transmissions" during the June 1 sweep of protesters, meaning that there is no audio record of Park Police communication. Rep. Raúl Grijalva, chairman of the House Natural Resources Committee, stated, "For the official audio record of that day to now turn up missing has every appearance of a coverup."

At a July 9, 2020, hearing of the House Armed Services Committee on Department of Defense involvement in domestic law enforcement, Esper testified that it was "still unclear" who gave the order to clear D.C. protesters but that "National Guard personnel were not engaged in clearing protesters in Lafayette Square"; and that Guard forces present "maintained a static role" rather than advancing against the demonstrators. Esper testified that the Guard had lent riot gear (including shields labeled "MILITARY POLICE") to other agencies.

Major Adam D. DeMarco of the D.C. National Guard testifies that the actions taken in Lafayette Square would have violated the Geneva Convention if done in Iraq.

The House Natural Resources Committee held its second hearing on July 28, 2020. Gregory T. Monahan, Acting Chief of the U.S. Park Police, testified that USPP officers "acted with tremendous restraint in the face of severe violence" and that the decision to clear the park was entirely unrelated to the President's planned visit. He reasserted that the clearing of Lafayette Square was unrelated to Trump's visit, and "his officers were under assault from projectiles again that day." Adam D. DeMarco, Major, D.C. National Guard testified that law enforcement used excessive force when clearing protesters from Lafayette Square and described the use of force as "an unnecessary escalation" and the events as "deeply disturbing". "From what I could observe, the demonstrators were behaving peacefully, exercising their First Amendment rights." DeMarco had not expected that Lafayette Square would be cleared prior to the 7:00 p.m. curfew and that he had been told tear gas would not be used but recognized its use. DeMarco stated that he was "30 yards [27 m] away from the officer giving the warnings [to clear the area] and about 20 yards [18 m] away from the front line of demonstrators" and that he could barely hear the warnings.

In his written response to the committee's follow-up questions, DeMarco said the Department of Defense's lead military police officer for the District of Columbia region had sought to use an Active Denial System or "heat ray", or a Long Range Acoustic Device, to clear the protesters from Lafayette Square, but was informed that the National Guard possessed neither device.

== Inspectors General ==
=== Department of the Interior ===
The June 2021 report by the Interior Department's Inspector General

On June 22, 2020, following requests from several members of Congress and Interior Secretary David Bernhardt, the Office of Inspector General (OIG) for the U.S. Department of the Interior, led by Inspector General Mark Greenblatt, launched a review of Park Police actions.

On June 9, 2021, the Interior OIG published the report on their review. According to the report, "[m]ost of the officers there were under Park Police direction (except the Secret Service) but the inspector general only 'sought interviews and information from individuals outside of the USPP when doing so would provide us with information about the agency's USPP's activities. Accordingly, we did not seek to interview Attorney General William Barr, White House personnel, Federal Bureau of Prisons (BOP) officers, [D.C. Metropolitan Police (MPD)] personnel, or Secret Service personnel regarding their independent decisions that did not involve the USPP.'" The IG also did not investigate "individual uses of force by USPP officers" because there were pending investigations and lawsuits on this topic.

The report concluded that the Park Police's plan to clear Lafayette Square and surrounding areas was lawful and consistent with policy, but made no conclusions on whether implementation of the plan at the time it was executed was a good decision.

The report concluded that the clearing of H street by the Park Police was part of a plan to install "antiscale fencing" and that these plans were made before Barr arrived on the scene and before Trump walked over to the church, and that the Park Police had only learned of Trump's plans to leave the White House when Barr urged them to speed up the timeline for clearing the park.

The report noted that "contrary to the operational plan", U.S. Secret Service began advancing on protesters before the Park Police had a chance to warn them to disperse. The report describes that a "Secret Service lieutenant later apologized for the early entry onto H Street during the operation but did not explain why it occurred". Some Park Police officers speculated that it may have occurred due to miscommunication or because they didn't have a shared radio channel. Since the OIG did not interview Secret Service personnel, they "cannot assess whether the Attorney General's visit to the park or any planned movement of the President influenced the Secret Service's actions, including its early deployment on to H Street". The report also concluded the Park Police began their clearing operation prior to completing dispersal orders, that commanders could not identify who gave the order to deploy, and that they were surprised that radio transmissions were not recorded as expected. A subsequent report issued in 2022 by the OIG concluded that USPP violated Department of Interior policy for years that requires all law enforcement radio communications be recorded. Conflicting information was received by investigators, but they found the analog recording system's hard drive was corrupted in 2018 and a new digital recording system was not configured to record all channels for “unknown reasons“.

The report concluded that although the Park Police used a Long Range Acoustic Device, borrowed from the DC MPD, to warn protesters to disperse three times, the warnings were not loud enough for all present to hear and were not completed before Park Police and Secret Service entered the street to begin the operation. The report cites multiple law enforcement officers as saying that "they either did not hear the warnings [for protesters to disperse] or could not clearly hear the information conveyed in the warnings". The report cites that the warnings did not inform protesters on which exit route to take to avoid the police's clearing operation.

Investigators found that there was poor communication and coordination among the various law enforcement agencies involved, which could have led to "confusion during the operation" and deviations from the operational plan. The report notes that Park Police did not use a shared radio channel with the Secret Service.

The report established that Park Police did not launch CS gas (tear gas) into the crowd, but that Bureau of Prisons forces "may have fired pepper balls into the crowd, contrary to the USPP incident commander's instructions" and that D.C. Metropolitan Police officers, who were not involved in the initial advance of police against the crowd, launched CS gas at demonstrators as they moved away from the park toward 17th Street. The report further noted that "the USPP acting chief of police and the USPP incident commander told us they did not request the [Bureau of Prisons]'s assistance and did not know who dispatched them to Lafayette Park on June 1".

=== Department of Justice ===
On July 23, 2020, Michael Horowitz, the U.S. Justice Department Inspector General, announced that his office was investigating the role of DOJ law enforcement personnel in responding to protests in Washington during the previous two months, "examining the training and instruction that was provided to the DOJ law enforcement personnel; compliance with applicable identification requirements, rules of engagement, and legal authorities; and adherence to DOJ policies regarding the use of less-lethal munitions, chemical agents, and other uses of force". He added that his office's Lafayette Square investigation would coordinate with the Interior Department OIG office. No report has been issued. The investigation appears on a list of ongoing reviews on the department's website, as of May 2024.

=== Department of Homeland Security ===
In 2020, Joseph V. Cuffari, the Trump-appointed Department of Homeland Security Inspector General, declined recommendations from DHS career staff and members of Congress to conduct an investigation into the clearing of Lafayette Square. As a result of his decision, "a variety of unanswered questions remain surrounding the Secret Service's adherence to its own use-of-force and related policies. Because Cuffari blocked the proposed review, it's unclear if a full picture will ever emerge of who was in charge or what happened inside the Secret Service's Joint Operation Center, which normally plays a key coordination role when protestors are cleared from Lafayette Square and its environs." Secret Service official Anthony M. Ornato, who had received the unprecedented permission to temporarily take a leave of absence to become a White House political advisor, had reportedly organized the photo-op. The Project on Government Oversight noted that "it remains unclear whether Ornato's role in the events of Lafayette Square ever came under scrutiny."

== Response ==
=== White House and Trump administration ===
Video released by the White House hours after the photo op

Within hours of the visit, the White House released a video of the event set to "swelling orchestral music", showing Trump walking to the church, standing in front of the church with a Bible, and pumping his fist while walking past a row of riot police. The video shows almost no sign of destruction caused by days of protests near the White House. Photos of Trump during this event, including those of him walking across Lafayette Square, were quickly distributed and displayed by Trump's re-election campaign.

The Trump administration gave conflicting explanations for the forcible removal of the demonstrators from the park. The White House asserted that the crowd was dispersed to help enforce the 7:00 p.m. curfew, but neither Mayor Bowser nor the D.C. police force ever requested such assistance, and demonstrators were forced out before curfew. Other Trump administration officials said the move to remove demonstrators was part of a previously planned decision by Barr and others to extend the perimeter around Lafayette Square by a block.

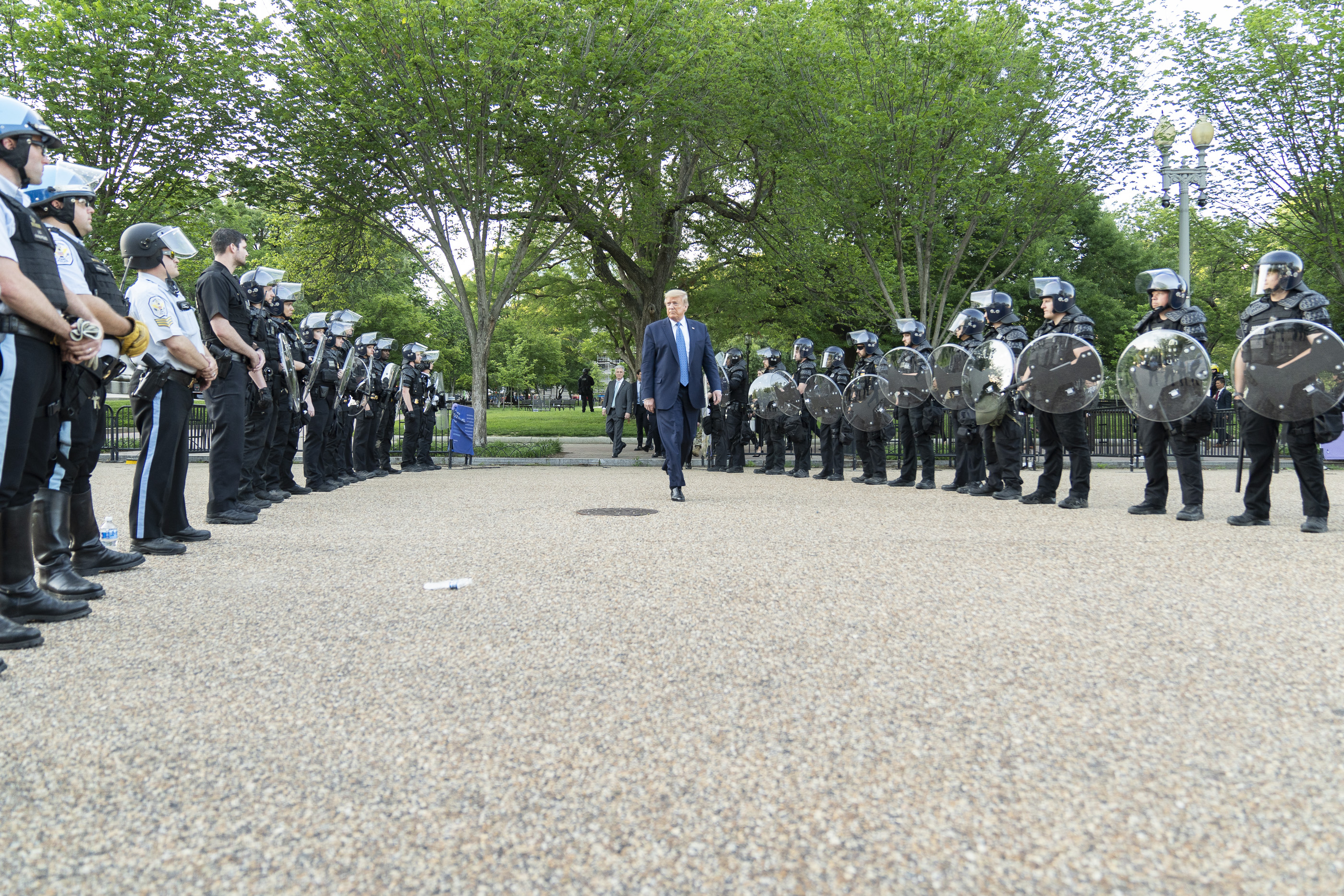
Trump walking through a cordon of law enforcement officers in riot gear after departing St. John's Episcopal Church

White House Press Secretary Kayleigh McEnany compared Trump's photo opportunity to British Prime Minister Winston Churchill's review of World War II bombing damage in 1941, saying it was "a message of resilience and determination". Several days later, she said: "There's no regrets on the part of this White House ... many of those decisions were not made here within the White House. It was AG Barr who made the decision to move the perimeter. Monday night Park Police had also made that decision independently when they saw all the violence in Lafayette Square."

Responding to criticisms, White House counselor Kellyanne Conway said, "Is it a photo op because a photo was taken? ... I think the words photo op itself, calling into question, you're looking into someone's heart and wondering, and second-guessing why they would go over there."

Axios quoted a senior White House official as saying "I've never been more ashamed. I'm really honestly disgusted. I'm sick to my stomach. And they're all celebrating it. They're very very proud of themselves."

==== Donald Trump ====
On June 2, Trump tweeted, "D.C. had no problems last night. Many arrests. Great job done by all. Overwhelming force. Domination. Likewise, Minneapolis was great (thank you President Trump!)". Later that day, he asserted that the same protesters who had been dispersed had set fire to the church. Two days later, Trump shared a letter on Twitter from his former attorney, John M. Dowd, apparently directed to James Mattis in the wake of his sharp criticism of Trump, calling the peaceful demonstrators who were forcibly removed from Lafayette Park "terrorists".

Speaking of his St. John's Church appearance in an interview with Fox News Channel, Trump said, "most religious leaders loved it. And why wouldn't they love it? I'm standing in front of a church that went through trauma. ... It's only the other side that didn't like it." However, only a small minority of church leaders expressed approval while many more sharply criticized his performance, including the pastor of St. John's Church, who had not been notified of Trump's plans, and the bishop of the diocese, who said she was "outraged". In a second Fox News interview days later, Trump said, "I think it was a beautiful picture ... And I'll tell you, I think Christians think it was a beautiful picture."

On June 11, Trump continued to praise law enforcement's handling of protesters and anarchists, tweeting, "Our great National Guard Troops who took care of the area around the White House could hardly believe how easy it was. 'A walk in the park', one said. The protesters, agitators, anarchists (ANTIFA), and others, were handled VERY easily by the Guard, D.C. Police, & S.S. GREAT JOB".

Trump said in a Wall Street Journal interview on June 18, that he could not enter the church because of "insurance reasons". However, Reverend Mariann Budde, who was overseeing the church at the time, refuted this claim stating "there were no insurance reasons why he couldn't go in" given that the damage was isolated to the church nursery.

==== William Barr ====
A Department of Justice spokeswoman said Attorney General William Barr had been appointed by Trump to lead "efforts to assist in the restoration of order to the District of Columbia".

In an interview with the Associated Press on June 5, Barr said the decision to expand the security perimeter was reached in a meeting he attended with law enforcement officials at approximately 2:00 p.m. on June 1, and the perimeter was to have been expanded immediately after the meeting. However, because the perimeter had not been expanded when Barr arrived at Lafayette Square later that afternoon, he "was frustrated" and "worried that as the crowd grew, it was going to be harder and harder to do".

Barr later distanced himself from the controversial move, saying that earlier on Monday he had ordered the security perimeter extended, and that upon seeing protesters still there in the afternoon he urged "get it done" but did not give the "tactical command" how to do it. Video shows him conferring with officials on the ground about 24 minutes before the police launched their push. Barr also said he was not "involved in giving tactical commands like that", the order to clear the protesters was given by a Park Police official whom he never spoke to, and it was already in progress when he arrived: "They had the Park Police mounted unit ready, so it was just a matter of execution. So, I didn't just say to them, 'Go.'"

Several days after the incident, Barr falsely claimed the pepper balls used by law enforcement on protesters were not chemical irritants. Pepper balls contain pelargonic acid vanillylamide; both the product's manufacturer and the Justice Department consider pepper balls a chemical irritant.

In a Fox News interview on June 8, Barr was asked three times if he would do anything differently in retrospect. Barr replied "no". He explained that the actions were taken in response to days of violent protests, including his being targeted by protester-thrown projectiles such as "rocks and bottles" during his visit to the park. Barr challenged the notion that expanding the security perimeter was associated with the photo op, calling it "totally false" and a "canard".

=== Local government officials ===
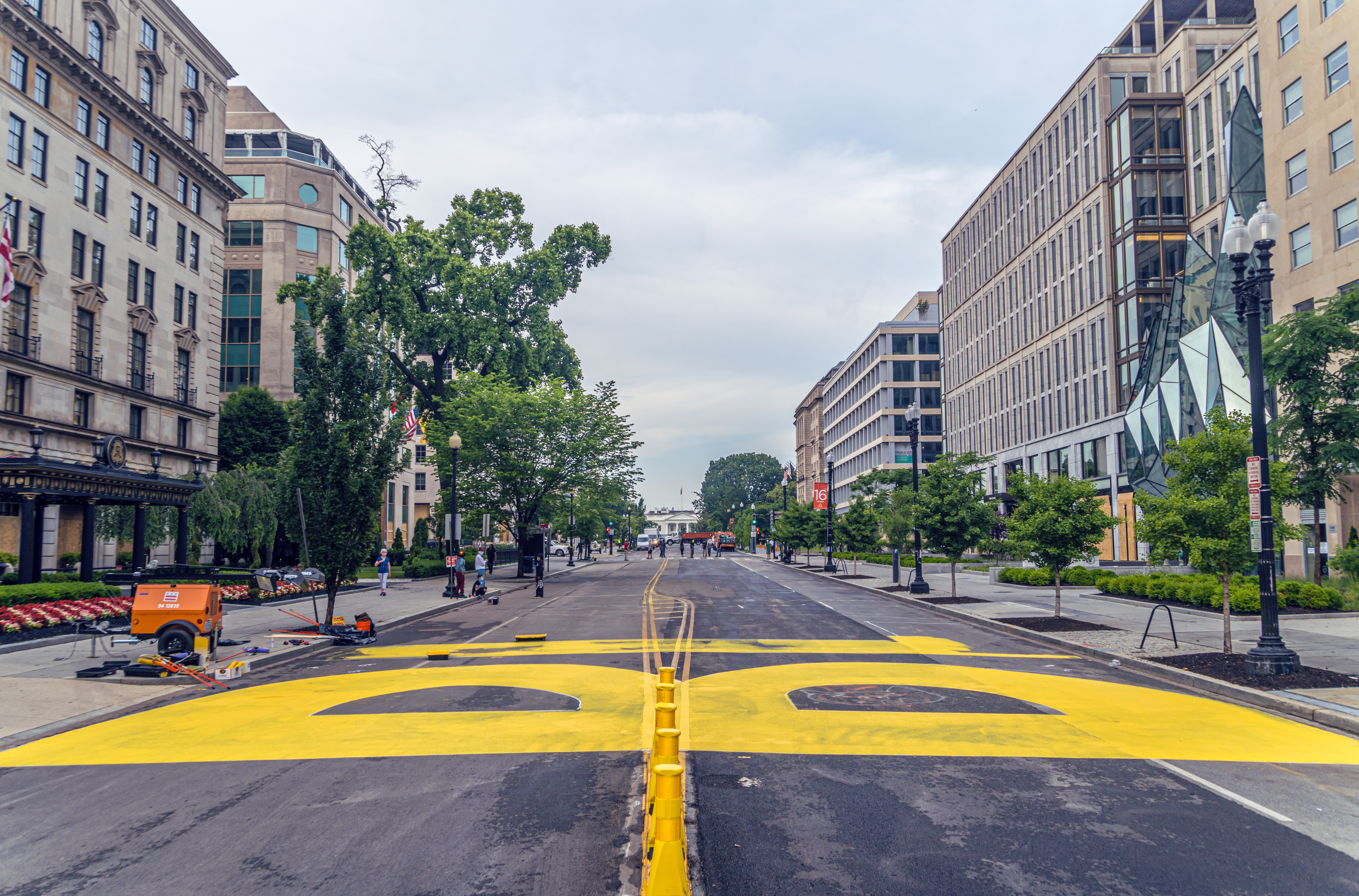
Painting "BLACK LIVES MATTER" on 16th St NW in front of St. John's on June 5

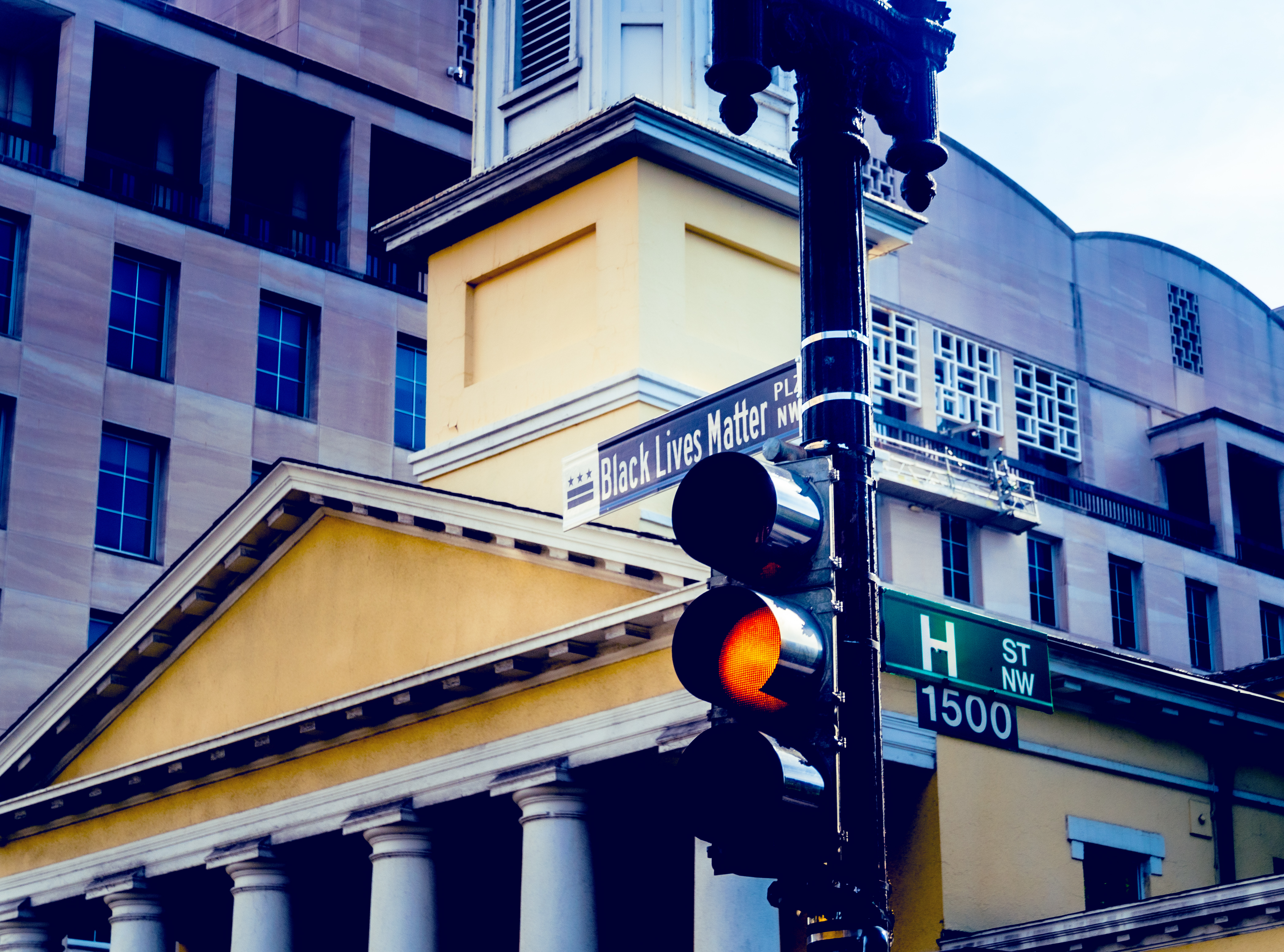
Black Lives Matter Plaza street sign in front of church, June 6

District of Columbia Mayor Muriel Bowser called the use of force "shameful" and released a statement through the office's Twitter account that "I imposed a curfew at 7:00 p.m. A full 25 minutes before the curfew & w/o provocation, federal police used munitions on peaceful protesters in front of the White House." Bowser also said this event will cause D.C. police to have more difficult jobs from then on.

In a statement, D.C. Attorney General Karl A. Racine said the district was "now reckoning with an unhinged president responding to nonviolent demonstration with war-like tactics". Racine referred to Trump's actions as that of a "tyrannical president", saying: "The entire country watched as Donald Trump ordered federal law enforcement and military police to assault peaceful protesters and clergy exercising their constitutional rights—unconscionably, for a photo opportunity."

Hours after police were used to clear Lafayette Square, neighboring Arlington County ordered its officers in D.C. (where they were supplied as part of a mutual aid agreement) to immediately withdraw; all Arlington County Police Department had left D.C. by 8:30 p.m. Arlington County Board Chair Libby Garvey said she was "appalled" that the agreement was abused "for a photo op". In a statement the next day, the Board said "This unprecedented decision by the County was a necessary response to an unprecedented situation" and said its action was to ensure its officers were "never again put in a situation where they are asked to take action that is inconsistent with our values".

On June 5, four days after the clearing of the square, Mayor Bowser oversaw renaming the intersection in front of St. John's Episcopal Church, the corner of 16th Street NW and H Street NW, to Black Lives Matter Plaza. A street sign was installed marking the new name, and the D.C. Department of Public Works, as well as artists with MuralsDC and volunteers, painted "BLACK LIVES MATTER" in large, capital, block letters stretching from Lafayette Square north for two blocks. Bowser's chief of staff John Falcicchio said, "There was a dispute this week about whose street this is ... Mayor Bowser wanted to make it abundantly clear that this is DC's street and to honor demonstrators who (were) peacefully protesting on Monday evening."

=== Religious leadership ===
The Right Reverend Mariann Budde, the Bishop of the Episcopal Diocese of Washington who oversees St. John's Church, decried how Trump "used violent means to ask to be escorted across the park into the courtyard of the church ... He did not pray ... He did not seek to unify the country, but rather he used our symbols and our sacred space as a way to reinforce a message that is antithetical to everything that the person of Jesus, whom we follow, and the gospel texts that we strive to emulate ... represent." She said the President had used the church as a backdrop and the Bible as a prop, adding "I am outraged that he felt he had the license to do that, and that he would abuse our sacred symbols and our sacred space in that way", adding that he had not told her he intended to visit.

The Most Reverend Michael Curry, the presiding bishop and primate of the Episcopal Church, said Trump was using "a church building and the Holy Bible for partisan political purposes".

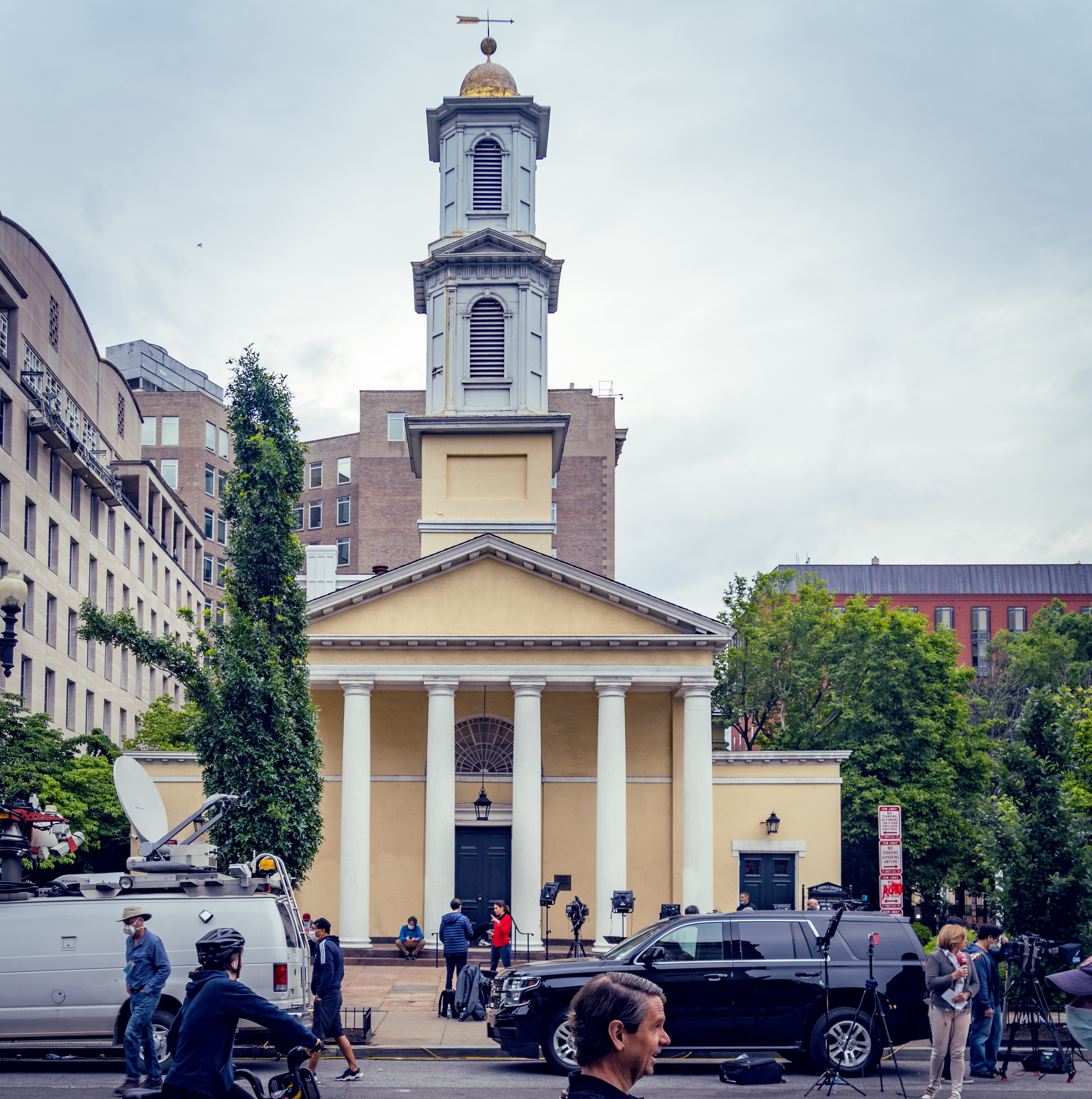
St. John's Church, June 2

Describing the incident, Rector Gerbasi said, "We were literally driven off of the St. John's, Lafayette Square patio with tear gas and concussion grenades and police in full riot gear ... We were pushed back 20 feet [6 m]." Gerbasi said Trump had transformed the church from a "holy ground" to a "battle ground", as well as making a "cheap political stunt".

Gregory Brewer, Bishop of the Episcopal Diocese of Central Florida, tweeted, "I am shaken watching protesters in Lafayette Park gassed and cleared so that the President of the United States can do a photo ... This is blasphemy in real time."

Nine Episcopal bishops from New England released a joint statement decrying Trump's actions as "disgraceful and morally repugnant". They criticized him for trying to use "an unopened Bible" to "claim Christian endorsement and imply that of The Episcopal Church". Worse, they wrote, he appeared to be using the "authority" of God "to support his own authority and to wield enhanced use of military force in a perverted attempt to restore peace to our nation".

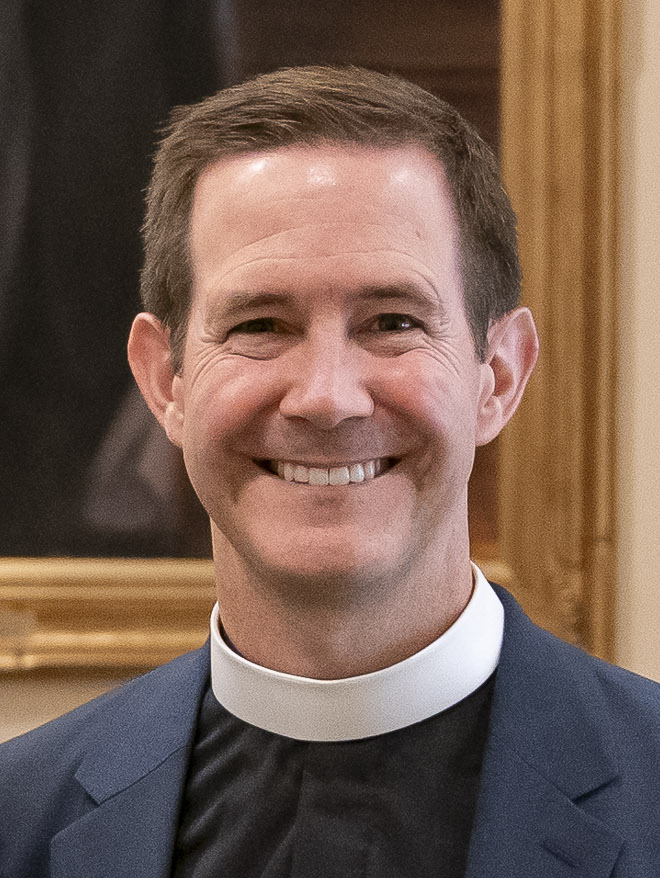
Reverend Robert W. Fisher, the 15th Rector at St. John's Episcopal Church in 2024

The Reverend Robert Fisher, the rector of St. John's Church, wrote a letter in support of the Black Lives Matter movement and shared a photo of a new sign displayed in front of the church reading: "BLACK LIVES MATTER ... Do Justice. Love Kindness. Walk humbly with your God. (Micah 6:8)".

Rabbi Jack Moline, president of the Interfaith Alliance, called the event "one of the most flagrant misuses of religion I have ever seen", which demonstrates Trump's "complete lack of compassion for black Americans and the lethal consequences of racism". Jesuit priest and author James Martin declared that Trump's actions are "pretty much the opposite of all Jesus stood for" and said: "Religion is not a political tool. And God is not a plaything." Bishop Elizabeth Eaton, leader of the Evangelical Lutheran Church of America, called Trump's actions "manipulative" and even described it as "desecration". Russell Moore, president of the Southern Baptist Convention's Ethics & Religious Liberty Commission, said the Bible "is the word of the living God and should be treated with reverence and awe". He said he was "brokenhearted and alarmed" both by Floyd's murder and by Trump's response.

Roman Catholic Archbishop of Washington, Wilton Daniel Gregory, criticized Trump's use of religious landmarks. Prior to Trump's June 2 visit to Saint John Paul II National Shrine, Gregory said that the planned visit was "baffling" and "reprehensible"; the shrine would be "egregiously misused and manipulated in a fashion that violates our religious principles"; and that Pope John Paul II "certainly would not condone the use of tear gas and other deterrents to silence, scatter or intimidate them for a photo opportunity in front of a place of worship and peace".

Megachurch pastor Robert Jeffress defended Trump' actions as "completely appropriate", claiming Trump's display of the Bible showed that "God also hates lawlessness". Franklin Graham, a prominent evangelical supporter of Trump, thanked Trump for having "made a statement".

Delivering the eulogy at George Floyd's memorial service in Houston, Texas, Baptist minister and civil rights leader the Reverend Al Sharpton said, "You take rubber bullets and teargas to clear out peaceful protesters, and then take a Bible and walk in front of a church, and use a church as a prop. Wickedness in high places."

Reverend Rob Schenck pointed out that it was odd for Trump to choose St. John's Church as the church to do a photo op at, considering the church was liberal and supported tenets normally opposed by conservative religious officials such as abortion rights and same-sex marriage. The Bible held by Trump was the Revised Standard Version, and Schenck said this translation "would be pretty much rejected by the vast majority of evangelicals" including a committed part of Trump's support base.

=== Current and former officials ===
==== Democrats ====
Former Vice President Joe Biden, the presumptive Democratic Party nominee in the 2020 United States presidential election said, "The president held up the Bible at St John's Church yesterday. I just wish he opened it once in a while ... In addition to the Bible, he might also want to open the U.S. Constitution. If he did, he'd find the First Amendment." Following the event, Speaker of the House of Representatives Nancy Pelosi and Senate Democratic Leader Chuck Schumer issued a joint statement, reading in part, "at a time when our country cries out for unification, this President is ripping it apart. Tear-gassing peaceful protesters without provocation just so that the President could pose for photos outside a church dishonors every value that faith teaches us."

A number of Democratic senators "used words like 'fascist' and 'dictator' to describe the president's words and actions". Senator Mark Warner (D-VA) called for Barr to resign over the order to extend the White House security perimeter during peaceful protests. Senator Tammy Duckworth (D-IL), an Iraq War veteran, said that Trump's use of the military to disperse the protesters was "tin-pot dictatorial" which "sickened her to the core". Representative Adam Smith (D-WA), chair of the House Armed Services Committee, criticized General Mark Milley for amplifying the rhetoric of Trump and Esper: "The optics of him being in uniform out there might not have been so bad if we didn't have the president out there talking about going to war with the country and using the military and using overwhelming force and Secretary Esper talking about the need to occupy the battlespace." Terry McAuliffe, who was governor of Virginia when Trump declared that there were "very fine people on both sides" of the 2017 Unite the Right rally, stated, "Charlottesville and the Bible incident are the two biggest moral failures of this president."

==== Republicans ====
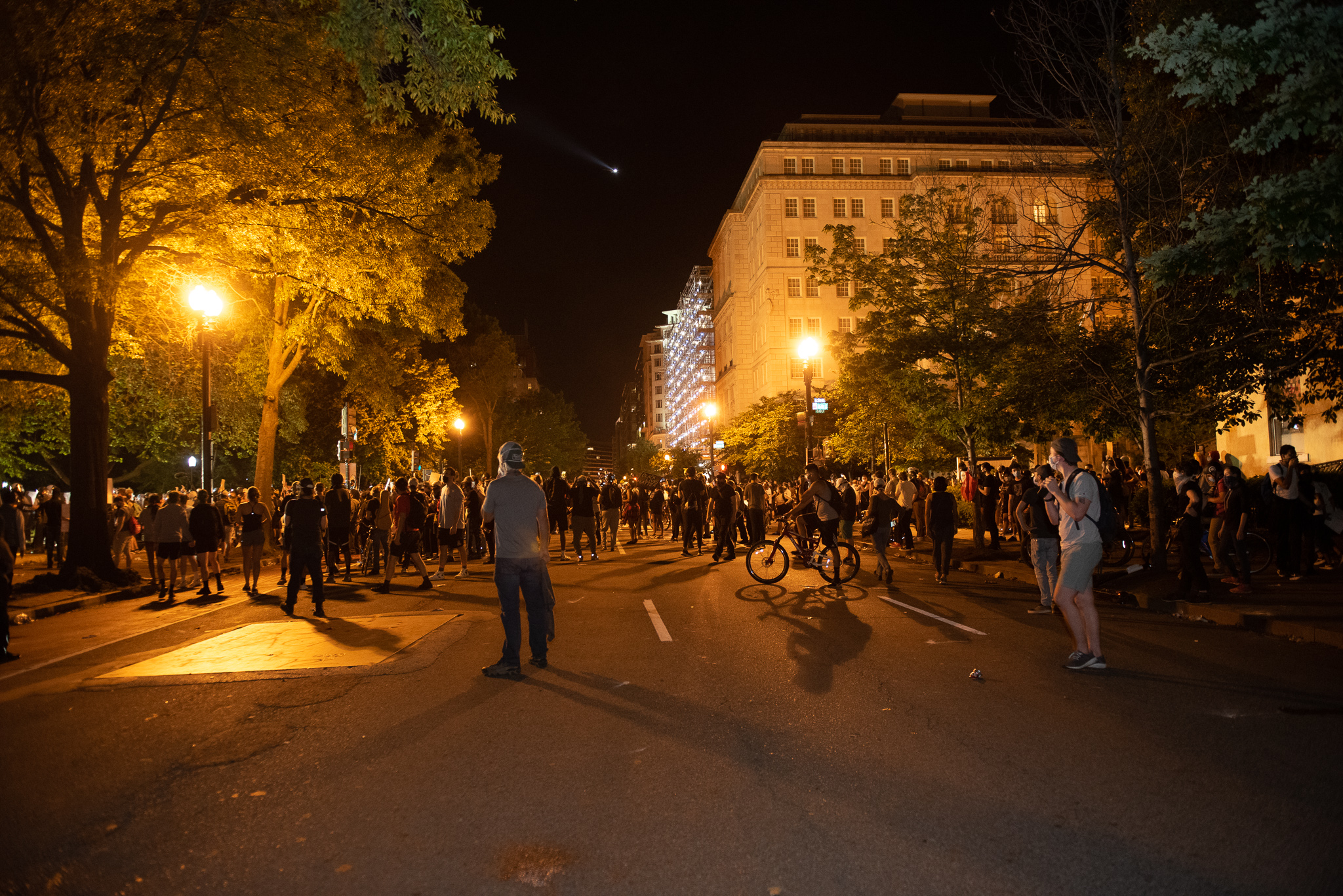
H Street NW, between St. John's Church and Lafayette Square, on the night of May 30

Some of Trump's fellow Republicans defended the clearing of protesters and subsequent photo op at the church, while others decried it. Senator John Cornyn told CNN the protesters had to be cleared out "for security purposes" since Trump was "walking over to the church" and dispersing them "was a necessary security measure". Senator Chuck Grassley defended the clearing of the protesters, stating, "It's all assumed to be peaceful until someone that's got a terrorist activity or a rioting activity, you don't know that until it happens. So I don't know if they could have known that." Senator Ted Cruz stated, "I'm glad the President went to St. John's church... It was strong and powerful for the President to go there and say we will not be cowed." Senator Marco Rubio also defended Trump, tweeting that professional agitators knew the street needed to be cleared before curfew but deliberately stayed to trigger police action and get the story they wanted, that "police attacked peaceful protesters".

By contrast, Senator Tim Scott, the only black Republican senator, objected to using tear gas "so the president can go have a photo op"; Senator Susan Collins said Trump "came across as unsympathetic" and "insensitive" and peaceful protesters were tear gassed "in order for the president to go across the street to a church". Senator Ben Sasse voiced his opposition to "clearing out a peaceful protest for a photo op that treats the Word of God as a political prop". Senator James Lankford criticized the timing of the president's visit for being before the 7:00 p.m. curfew, as "everyone knew there were going to be protesters in that area" at that time. Senator Lisa Murkowski said, "I did not think that what we saw last night was the America I know."

==== Former Justice Department officials ====
A group of 1,260 former U.S. Department of Justice (DOJ) prosecutors and other officials issued an open letter on June 11, asking Michael E. Horowitz, the Inspector General of the Department of Justice, to investigate Attorney General William Barr over his role in the use of chemical agents and rubber bullets to halt a peaceful demonstration. The former officials (who included former career DOJ civil servants, former DOJ political appointees, and retired judges) wrote: "If the Attorney General or any other DOJ employee has directly participated in actions that have deprived Americans of their constitutional rights or that physically injured Americans lawfully exercising their rights, that would be misconduct of the utmost seriousness, the details of which must be shared with the American people."

=== Current and former military officers and officials ===
==== Esper ====
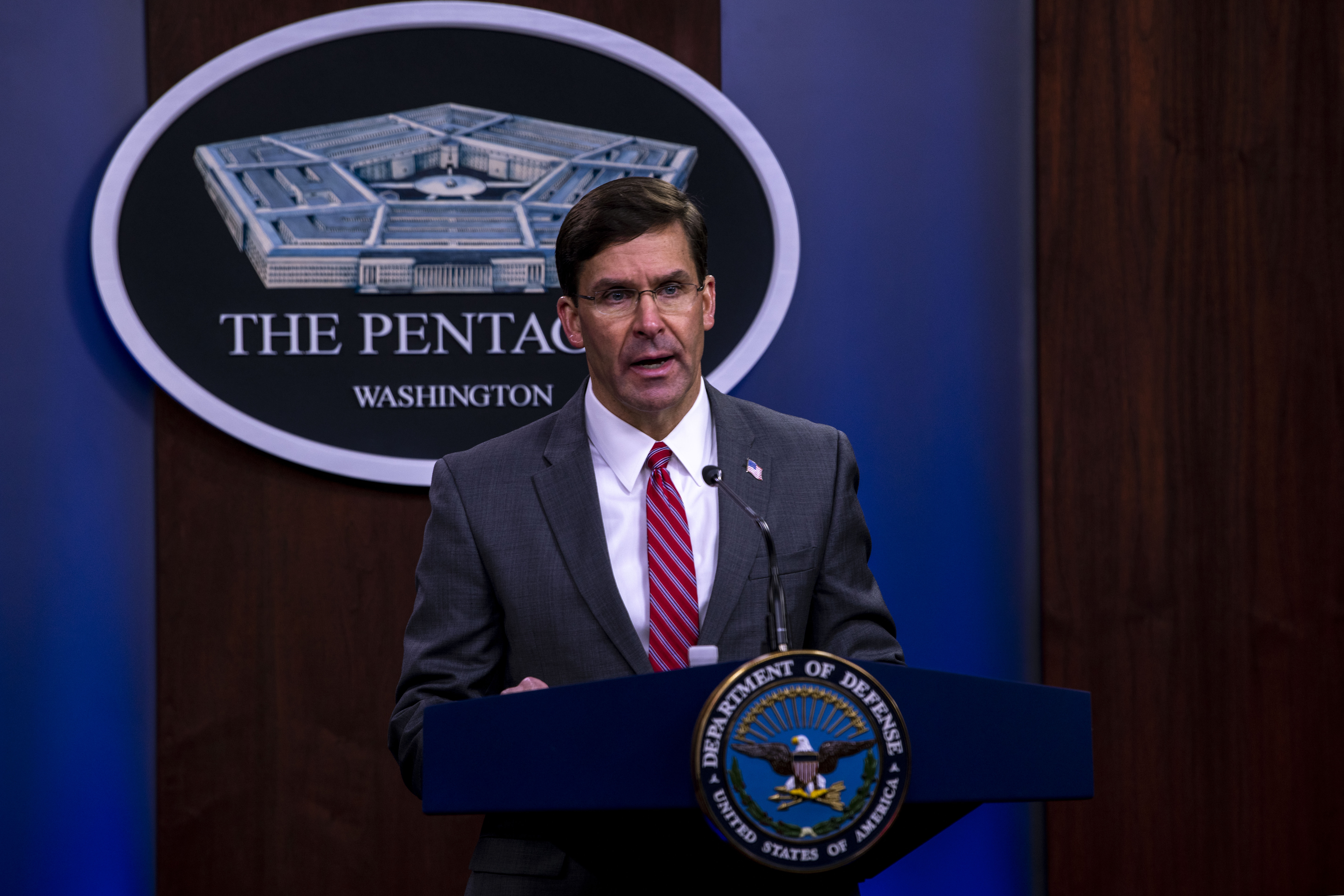
Secretary Esper at Pentagon news conference, June 3

Trump was accompanied on his walk and photo opportunity by Defense Secretary Mark Esper and Chairman of the Joint Chiefs of Staff Mark Milley, prompting criticism of both men. An anonymous senior defense official said neither had intended to participate, and in a subsequent interview with NBC, Esper said he believed the walk was to review the troops and was not aware a peaceful protest had just been dispersed. At a news conference on June 3, Esper revised his account, saying, "I did know that we were going to the church; I was not aware that a photo op was happening."

Esper did not directly answer a question from the press about whether he regretted participating in the photo-op, saying that he tried to stay apolitical but "Sometimes, I'm successful, and sometimes I'm not as successful." Esper also said he was not aware of the plan to clear the park and criticized the use of a helicopter. On June 3, Esper sought to send home a small portion of the 1,600 active-duty troops called to Washington, but during an angry meeting, Trump ordered Esper not to do so. The following day, amid a contentious dispute between the Pentagon and the White House, some National Guard troops began to withdraw.

Regarding the use of active-duty military, Esper said "The option to use active-duty forces in a law enforcement role should only be used as a matter of last resort and only in the most urgent and dire of situations. We are not in one of those situations now. I do not support invoking the Insurrection Act." In a memoir published in 2022, Esper wrote of Lafayette Square, "the tactics employed seemed excessive and unnecessary."

Esper directed the Secretary of the Army Ryan McCarthy to lead an after action review of the National Guard's role in domestic law enforcement. The review was expected to be completed by July 30, 2020.

==== Milley ====
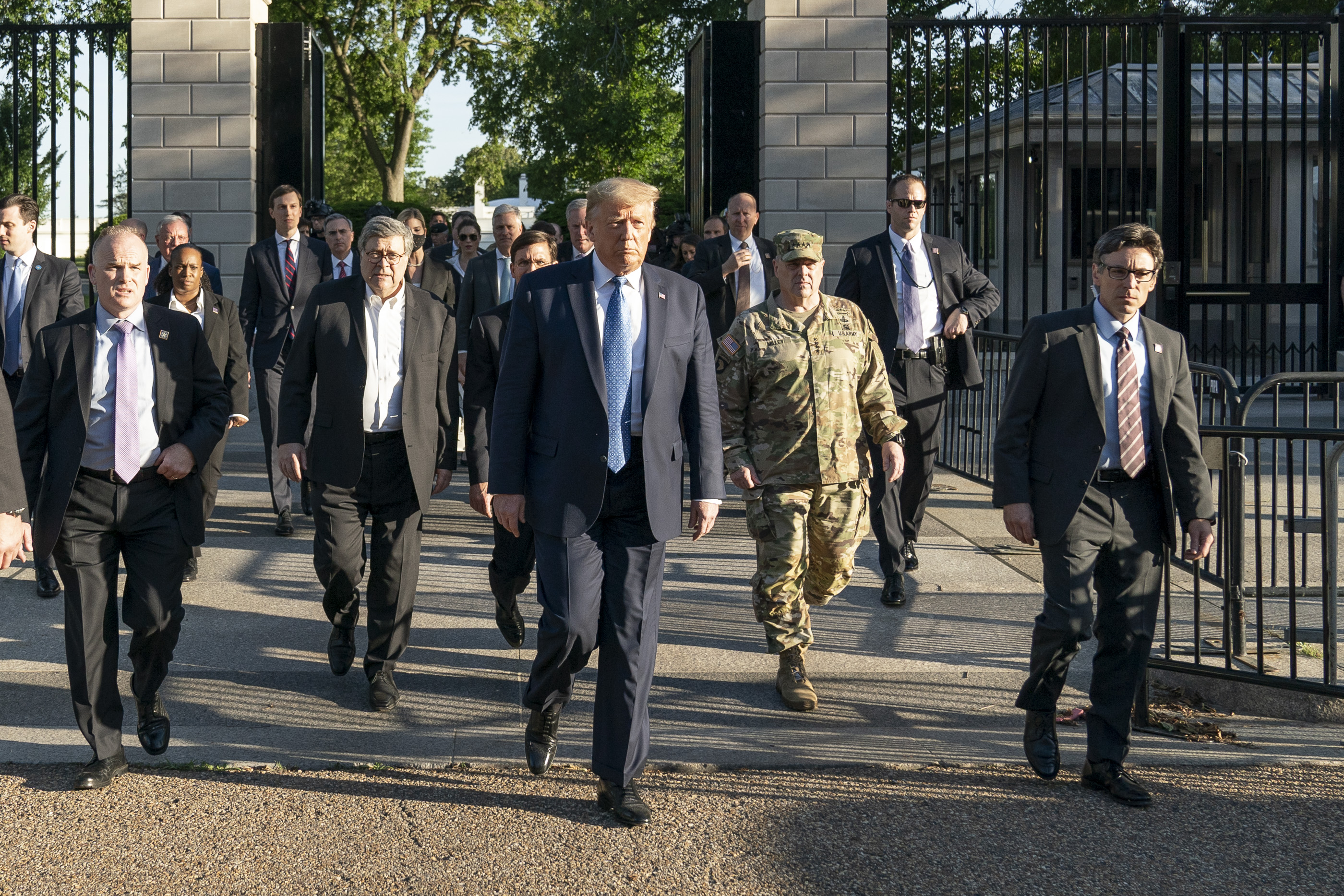
President Trump leaves the White House grounds accompanied by senior officials, including General Mark A. Milley (right) in combat uniform.

In the days after the photo op, Joint Chiefs of Staff Chairman Mark Milley—who had accompanied Trump under the belief that he intended to review troops outside Lafayette Square—expressed anger to Trump over what had occurred. On June 1, Milley and Trump had a "heated discussion in the Oval Office over whether to send active-duty troops into the streets"—a demand by Trump that Milley strongly opposed. Milley publicly said he opposed invocation of the Insurrection Act and issued a memorandum on June 2 to the heads of each branch, reminding them "[the Constitution] gives Americans the right to freedom of speech and peaceful assembly" and of each member's sworn oath to "remain committed to our national values and principles embedded in the Constitution".

Milley considered resigning from his role as Joint Chiefs Chairman over the incident. In a draft resignation letter that was never submitted to the President, Milley wrote, "It is my belief that you were doing great and irreparable harm to my country. I believe that you have made a concerted effort over time to politicize the United States military."

On June 11, in a recorded commencement address to the National Defense University (his first public comments since the event), Milley apologized for his role in Trump photo-op, saying, "I should not have been there. My presence in that moment and in that environment created a perception of the military involved in domestic politics. ... As a commissioned uniformed officer, it was a mistake that I have learned from."

==== Mattis ====
Retired Marine Corps general Jim Mattis, who served as Trump's first Secretary of Defense until his resignation in 2018, denounced Trump as a threat to the Constitution. In a statement published in The Atlantic, Mattis wrote that he had witnessed "this week's unfolding events, angry and appalled" and said he never believed U.S. forces "would be ordered under any circumstance to violate the Constitutional rights of their fellow citizens—much less to provide a bizarre photo op for the elected commander-in-chief, with military leadership standing alongside". Mattis described Trump as "the first president in my lifetime who does not try to unite the American people—does not even pretend to try" and wrote: "We know that we are better than the abuse of executive authority that we witnessed in Lafayette Square. We must reject and hold accountable those in office who would make a mockery of our Constitution." Trump responded to Mattis by calling him "the world's most overrated General". John Kelly, former White House Chief of Staff and U.S. Secretary of Homeland Security under Trump, said he agreed with Mattis's criticism of Trump: "I agree with him. I think we need to step back from the politics ... the separation of powers is very, very, very important. No president ever is a dictator or a king."

==== Former military ====
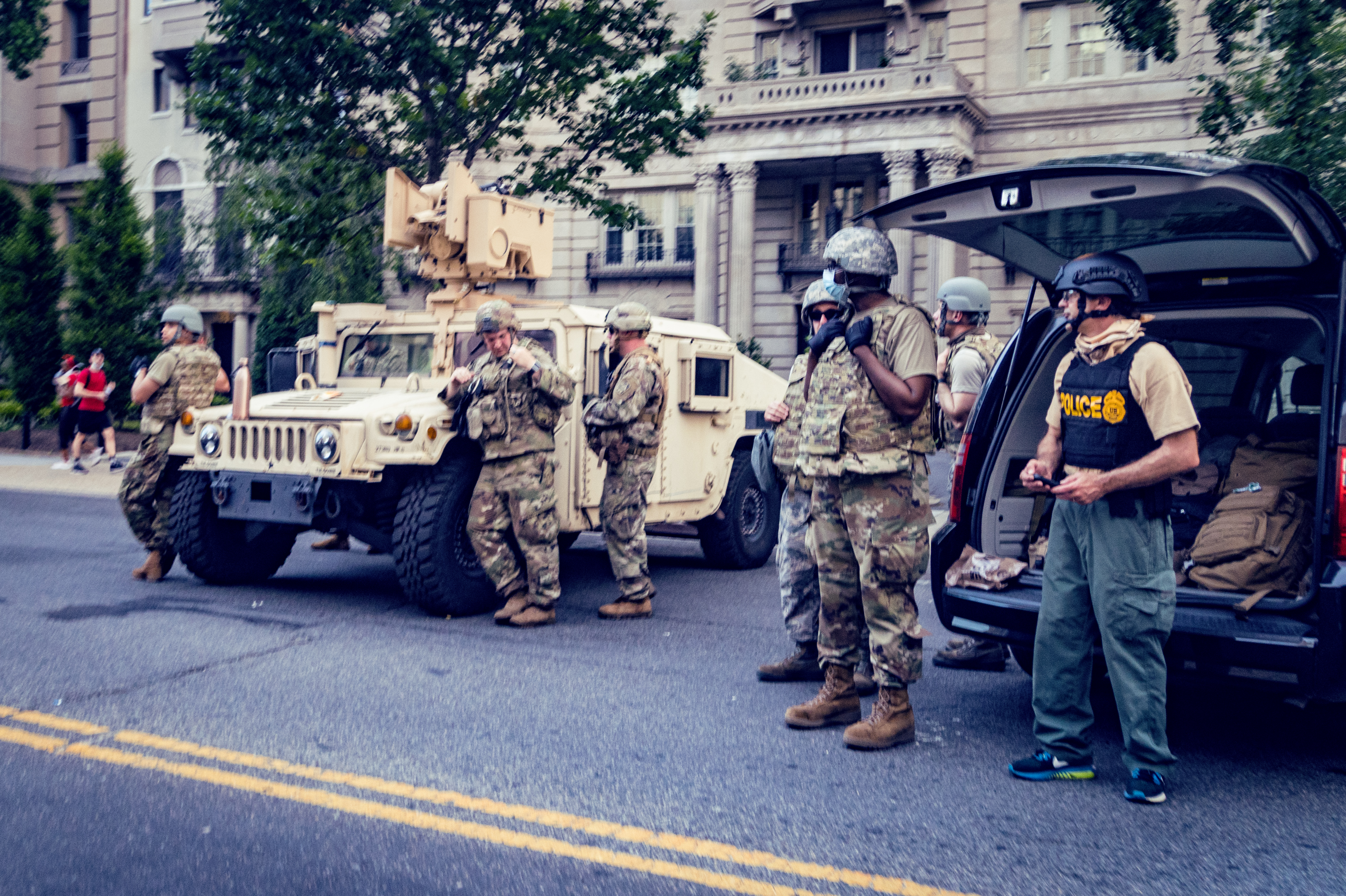
National Guard troops on streets of D.C., June 3

Former military leaders condemned Trump over his response to protests and the order to clear demonstrators from Lafayette Square. A letter signed by a bipartisan group of 89 former Defense officials, including four former Secretaries of Defense, was published in The Washington Post. The officials objected to Trump's proposal of deploying the military, declaring that American troops "signed up to fight our nation's enemies and to secure—not infringe upon—the rights and freedoms of their fellow Americans".

Retired four-star general and former Chairman of the Joint Chiefs of Staff Martin Dempsey wrote, "America is not a battleground. Our fellow citizens are not the enemy." Mick Mulroy, former Assistant Secretary of Defense for the Trump administration, echoed Dempsey: "Active Army and Marine Corps units are trained to fight our nation's enemies, not their fellow Americans. American cities are not battlefields."

Mike Mullen, a retired Navy admiral and a former Chairman of the Joint Chiefs of Staff, criticized Trump for having "risked further politicizing the men and women of our armed forces" and urged Americans not to forget "the larger and deeper concerns about institutional racism that have ignited this rage". Mullen warned that "our fellow citizens are not the enemy" and said American cities and towns were "neighborhoods" and not "battle spaces to be dominated". Mullen concluded "This is not the time for stunts. This is the time for leadership."

Retired Admiral William McRaven said, "You're not going to use, whether it's the military, or the National Guard, or law enforcement, to clear peaceful American citizens for the president of the United States to do a photo op ... There is nothing morally right about that."

Former Republican Secretary of State Colin Powell said he was "proud" of the statements issued by retired military leaders. "We have a Constitution. And we have to follow that Constitution. And the President has drifted away from it." In a Bloomberg editorial, former supreme allied commander of NATO, James Stavridis, also expressed support for the statements.

In a piece in Foreign Policy, retired Marine general and former U.S. envoy John R. Allen wrote that the U.S. under Trump had begun turning illiberal, which "may well signal the beginning of the end of the American experiment". Allen wrote that Trump "doesn't care about the devout, except insofar as they serve his political needs" and had "failed to project any of the higher emotions or leadership desperately needed in every quarter of this nation during this dire moment". Allen also wrote "It wasn't enough that peaceful protesters had just been deprived of their first-amendment rights—this photo-op sought to legitimize that abuse with a layer of religion."

On June 2, the former Under Secretary of Defense for Policy James Miller resigned from the Defense Science Board in protest after the incident, while sharing his resignation letter with The Washington Post. Miller wrote that Trump "violated his oath to 'take care that the laws be faithfully executed', as well as the First Amendment 'right of the people peaceably to assemble'". He cited his own oath of office and wrote that Esper had violated the same oath—to support and defend the Constitution—saying Esper "visibly supported" Trump's "directing this appalling use of force". Miller also criticized Esper's statement urging state governors to "dominate the battlespace", writing, "I cannot believe that you see the United States as a 'battlespace', or that you believe our citizens must be 'dominated'. Such language sends an extremely dangerous signal."

Retired Army general Wesley Clark, former Supreme Allied Commander Europe of NATO, said: "It was really shocking and outrageous. There was no reason for it. Then to see the president come across with the military leadership, oh, it looked ugly."

==== National Guard on the scene ====
One of the Guardsmen on the scene later recalled, "As a military officer, what I saw was more or less really fucked up ... the crowd was loud but peaceful, and at no point did I feel in danger, and I was standing right there in the front of the line. A lot of us are still struggling to process this, but in a lot of ways, I believe I saw civil rights being violated in order for a photo op." Another guardsman confirmed the presence of tear gas, adding that "I've been tear gassed before. I was there the night before when we got tear gassed, [and] there was tear gas there" Monday evening.

=== Scholars ===
Law professor Garrett Epps wrote that "the dispersal of the peaceful protesters in Lafayette Square was a monstrous violation of America's venerable right of assembly" as guaranteed by the Constitution's First Amendment. John Fea, a professor of American history at Messiah College, said, "Looking back through history, whenever you see someone in authority using the Bible to justify law and order, it ends badly." Historian Robert Kagan, a Brookings Institution senior fellow and Washington Post contributing columnist, wrote that General Milley's appearance in the photo—in combat uniform—might "turn out to be the first in a series of pictures in some future history text about the undermining of American democracy". Princeton University's Eddie Glaude said the photo op represents "the theater of dictatorial power", asserting that "people saw it clearly for what it was, and to conscript the military into that performance made concrete the feeling that not only are we seeing the erosion of democratic norms, but the very institutions of the country are in jeopardy."

Jameel Jaffer of the Knight First Amendment Institute said there was a strong legal case that the protesters' First Amendment rights were violated. Of particular relevance is a 2015 legal settlement made after the unlawful 2002 mass arrest of anti-globalization protesters in Pershing Park. In the settlement, the U.S. Park Police agreed to revise its policies to ensure warnings to protesters that they are in violation of the law are clearly audible to the entire crowd, and that demonstrators have adequate time to respond to instructions.

=== Media ===
The New York Times editorial board called Attorney General William Barr's decision to forcibly clear a peaceful protest in a public park and churchyard for Trump to conduct a photo-op "a brazen display of this administration's disregard for the First Amendment" that "managed to take aim at the freedom of assembly, speech and religion all at the same time". The Washington Post editorial board criticized Barr and Trump's actions as "cheap political theater" and called upon leaders in Congress and the military to dissuade Trump from deploying active-duty Army soldiers on Americans streets (as Trump indicated he might do), saying such a move would be "unacceptable" and "move America closer to anarchy".

=== International reactions ===
The scenes of peaceful protesters being violently dispersed were seized upon by the U.S.'s international adversaries, undercutting U.S. diplomats' efforts to promote democracy and human rights abroad. Representatives of Russia, China, and Iran used the event to challenge America's moral authority and historical advocacy for the rights of protesters.

Prime Minister of Canada Justin Trudeau was asked to comment on Trump's proposal of using the military against protesters in the United States, as well as the protesters being cleared for the photo op. Trudeau paused for 21 seconds before responding: "We all watch in horror and consternation at what is going on in the United States". Trudeau continued, "it is a time to listen" and "a time to learn what injustices continue despite progress".
