= Franz the Bear =

Sculpture in Park City, Utah, U.S.

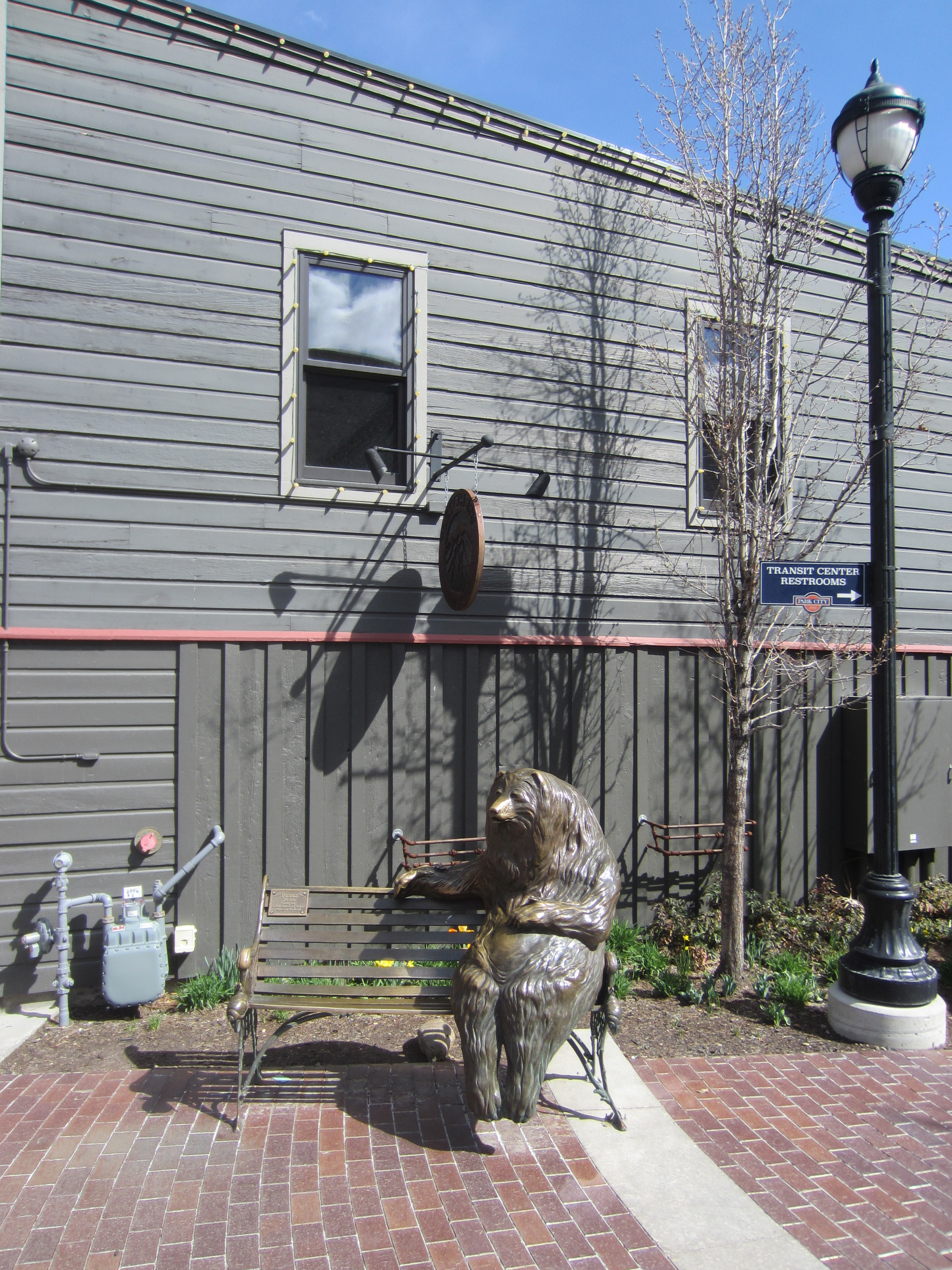
- The sculpture in 2021
- Artist: Michele vandenHeuvel
- Location: Park City, Utah, United States
- 40°38′42.9″N 111°29′47.7″W

Franz the Bear is a statue of a bear on a bench by Michele vandenHeuvel, installed in Park City, Utah, United States. Franz the Bear sits on a bench and is intended as a photo op for visitors.

== History ==
The public art piece was commissioned for the 2002 Winter Olympics, and was originally located at Park City’s transportation hub. Franz now sits on a walkway between Main Street and Swede Alley.

Someone placed a face mask on the statue during the COVID-19 pandemic. The bear was also featured in signs encouraging people to wear masks.

The work was vandalized in January 2021.

In 2024, Franz was listed as one of "11 Beloved Park City Landmarks."

== See also ==
- Loosey the Moose
