= Loosey the Moose =

Sculpture in Park City, Utah, U.S.

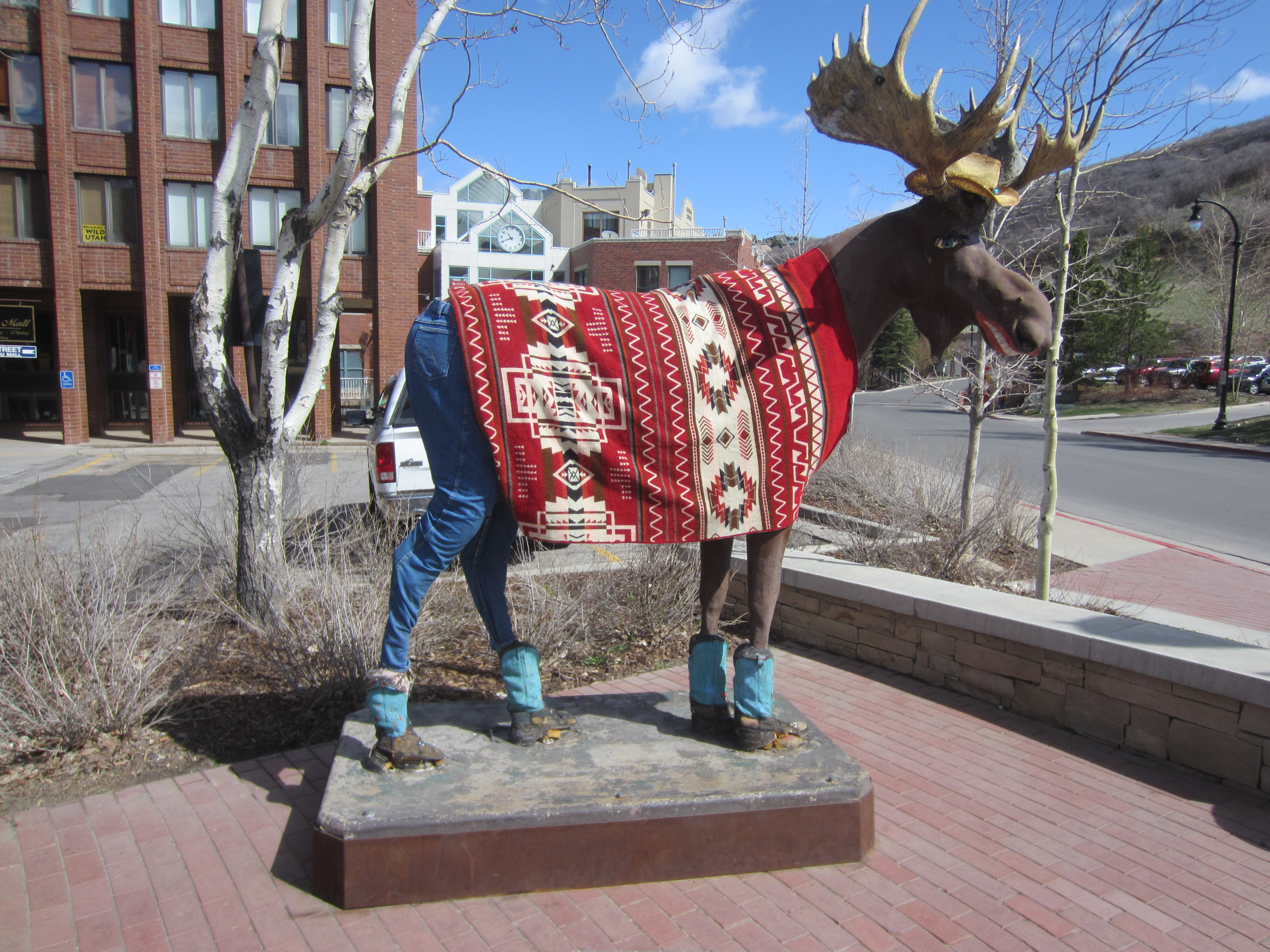
- The statue in 2021
- Artist: Brent Brimhall
- Year: 2003
- Medium: fiberglass, acrylic paint, textile materials
- Subject: Moose
- Location: Park City, Utah, United States
- 40°38′43.5″N 111°29′46.5″W

Loosey the Moose is a public sculpture of a moose by artist Brent Brimhall. It is located in Park City, Utah, United States.

The sculpture is used as a landmark and photo op for pedestrians.

== History ==
The sculpture was originally created in 2003 by artist Brent Brimhall, as part of a fundraiser for arts organizations known as "Moose on the Loose."

Previously, Loosey was located on private property outside 558 Main St. The sculpture has been vandalized in the past. In late 2012, someone snapped off the antlers and the moose's hat was removed.

In 2017, former owners, the Davis family, donated Loosey to City Hall. In 2019, the sculpture was "freshened up" and relocated to the walkway that links Main Street with Swede Alley and the Old Town transit center. Loosey is on the Swede Alley side, while fellow public sculpture Franz the Bear sits on the Main Street side.

Someone outfitted the statue with a face mask during the COVID-19 pandemic in 2020.

== See also ==
- Franz the Bear
