= Ashburton House =

Historic house in Washington, D.C., United States

- U.S. National Register of Historic Places
- U.S. National Historic Landmark
- U.S. National Historic Landmark District – Contributing property
- D.C. Inventory of Historic Sites
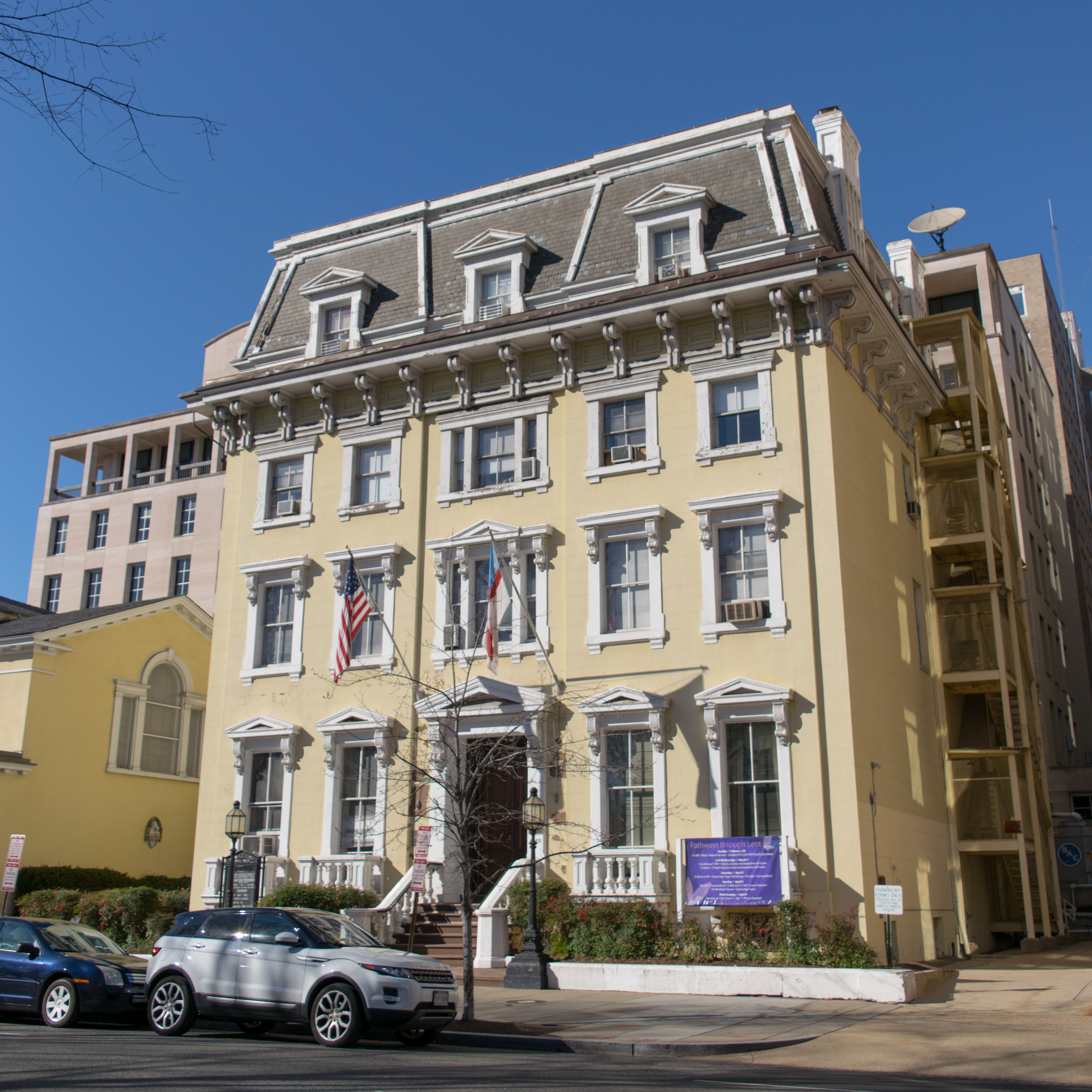

- Location within Central Washington, D.C. Location within the United States
- Location: 1525 H St., NW., Washington, D.C.
- Coordinates: 38°54′1.6″N 77°2′8.6″W
- Built: 1836
- Architect: Matthew St. Clair Clarke
- Part of: Lafayette Square Historic District (ID70000833)
- NRHP reference No.: 73002071

Significant dates
- Added to NRHP: November 7, 1973
- Designated NHL: November 7, 1973
- Designated NHLDCP: August 29, 1970
- Designated DCIHS: November 8, 1964

Ashburton House, also known as St. John's Church Parish House or the British Legation, is a historic house at 1525 H Street NW, on Lafayette Square in Washington, D.C. Built in 1836, it is notable as the residence of Lord Ashburton in 1842, during which time negotiations took place there culminating the Webster–Ashburton Treaty. This settled a long list of border disputes between the U.S. and the British provinces that are now Canada, and ended the Aroostook War. It was declared a National Historic Landmark in 1973. It presently serves as the parish house for St. John's Episcopal Church.

== Description and history ==
Ashburton House stands on the north side of H Street, facing Lafayette Square to the south, just east of St. John's Episcopal Church, to which it is now connected by a narrow hyphen. It is a 3 1/2-story brick structure, with a mansard roof. The roof has a broad eave supported by decorative brackets, and is pierced by dormers with deeply pedimented gables. Its main facade is five bays wide, with each outer pair projecting slightly. Windows on the ground floor, and the center entrance, are framed by bracketed gabled lintels. Second floor windows have flat bracketed lintels, and third floor windows have simpler entablatures. The central windows on the second and third floor are three-part windows in the Palladian style, with narrow side windows.

Matthew St. Clair Clarke, clerk of the United States House of Representatives, purchased land for the house in 1834 and began the original brick building in 1836. Shortly afterwards, it was sold to Joseph Gales, publisher of the National Intelligencer and a past Mayor of Washington, D.C. Lord Alexander Ashburton took up residence in the house in 1842, which was rented for him by United States Secretary of State Daniel Webster. While he lived there, the two men negotiated the Webster-Ashburton Treaty in its parlor, which resolved most of the boundary disputes between the U.S. and the British Canadian provinces as far west as the Great Lakes. Ashburton was succeeded by novelist Edward Bulwer-Lytton; both made changes to Clark's design. The house received its French Second Empire design in the 1850s, designed by Thomas U. Walter. It again underwent alteration in the 1870s.

St. John's acquired the building 1953, and adapted its interior for use as a parish hall. A $5.5 million renovation of the house was completed in 2018.

Early in the morning of June 1, 2020, during local protests following the murder of George Floyd by Minneapolis police, a fire was set in the basement of Ashburton House. The fire was contained to one room, the nursery.

== See also ==
- List of National Historic Landmarks in Washington, D.C.
- National Register of Historic Places listings in central Washington, D.C.
