= Photo op =

Photograph opportunity as media event

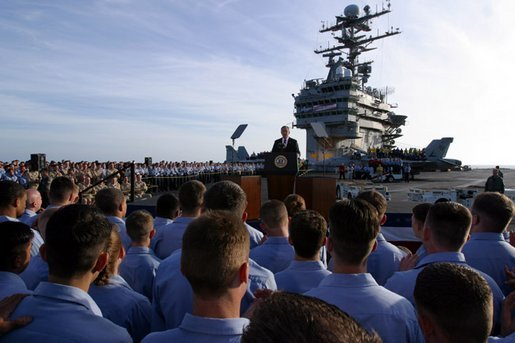
US President George W. Bush gives the "Mission Accomplished" speech aboard the USS Abraham Lincoln (CVN-72)

A photo op (sometimes written as photo opp), short for photograph opportunity (or photo opportunity), is an arranged opportunity to take a photograph of a politician, a celebrity, or an event.

The term was coined by the administration of US President Richard Nixon. William Safire credited its coinage to Bruce Whelihan, an aide to Nixon Press Secretary Ron Ziegler. Ziegler would say "Get 'em in for a picture", and Whelihan would dutifully announce to the White House press room, "There will be a photo opportunity in the Oval Office."

The term has acquired a negative connotation, referring to a carefully planned pseudo-event, often masqueraded as news. It is associated with politicians who perform tasks such as planting trees, picking up litter, and visiting senior citizens, often during election cycles, with the intent of photographers catching the events, generating positive publicity.

Among nearly ritual photo ops are those when participants of a summit get out of their cars, shake hands or kiss, or sign a document. Formal, planned photography sessions in the White House date back to the 1930s, when Franklin Roosevelt's press secretary advised photographers to avoid taking photos of the President in a wheelchair.

== See also ==
- Media clip
- Donald Trump photo op at St. John's Church
- Publicity stunt
- Soundbite
- Video clip
