= Randall (surname) =

- Language: English, Irish

Origin
- Origin: Germanic languages, Celtic languages: old Irish and English
- Derivation: Randulf, Rannulf, Mac Raghnaill (Ireland)
- Meaning: son of the shield-wolf, raven wolf
- Region of origin: England, Ireland

Other names
- Alternative spelling: McRandall, Randal, Randell

Randall is a surname of English and Irish origin. It is a cognate of the name Randolph meaning "shield-wolf", composed of rand "shield" plus úlfr "wolf". In Ireland, Randall may be an anglicized form of the Gaelic Mac Raghnaill meaning "son of Raghnall".

Randall is also used as a masculine given name, derived from the surname.

== Notable people ==
=== A ===
- Adam Randall (American football) (born 2004), American football player
- Addison Randall, American film actor
- Adriana Randall, South African politician
- Alexander Randall, American (Wisconsin) politician
- Alexander Randall (Maryland politician), congressman, Attorney General of Maryland
- Alice Randall, African American author and songwriter
- Anne Randall, American model
- Archibald Randall, United States District Court judge
- Archibald N. Randall, American (Wisconsin) politician
- Arthur Randall, Scottish World War I flying ace

=== B ===
- Benjamin Randall (disambiguation), several people

- Benjamin Randall (1749–1808), founder of Freewill Baptist Connexion in the United States
- Benjamin Randall (Maine politician) (1789–1859), American congressman
- Benjamin Randall (Wisconsin politician) (1793–1863), American politician
- Benjamin H. Randall (1823–1913), American politician from the state of Minnesota

- Bob Randall (Aboriginal Australian elder) (1929–2015), Aboriginal Australian elder, singer and community leader
- Bob Randall (baseball) (born 1948), American baseball player, 1976–1980
- Bob Randall (politician), politician in South Australia
- Brett Randall, (1884–1963), Australian little theatre director

=== C ===
- Chad Randall, Australian Rugby League player and model
- Charles Hiram Randall (1865–1961), American newspapere publisher and politician
- Charles S. Randall, former US representative from Massachusetts
- Clarence B. Randall, American lawyer and businessman
- Clifford E. Randall, American politician
- Connor Randall, English football player

=== D ===
- Damarious Randall (born 1992), American football player
- Dana Randall, professor of theoretical computer science
- David Randall, English journalist, author, and comic
- Derek Randall, England cricketer
- Dick Randall, Australian public servant
- Don Randall (politician), Australian politician
- Dudley Randall, African-American poet and publisher

=== E, F ===
- Elizabeth Randall, American (New Jersey) politician
- Edwin M. Randall, Florida supreme court justice
- Elliott Randall, American guitarist
- Emily Randall, U.S. Representative from the state of Washington
- Frankie Randall, boxer

=== G, H ===
- George Randall (disambiguation), multiple people
- Harry Randall (disambiguation), multiple people
- Herbert Randall, American photographer
- Holly Randall, American erotic photographer

=== J ===
- Jack Randall (disambiguation), several people
- James Randall (murderer), convicted rapist and murderer
- James Ryder Randall, American journalist and poet
- Jan Randall, Canadian composer and pianist
- Jeff Randall (journalist)
- Jessy Randall, American poet and archivist
- Joe Randall (1946–2026), American chef, cookbook author, and educator
- Joel Randall (born 1999), English footballer
- John Randall (disambiguation), several people
- Josh Randall, American television actor
- Julia Randall, American poet

=== K, L ===
- Ken Randall (1888–1947), Canadian ice hockey player
- Kikkan Randall (born 1982), American cross-country skier
- Leslie Randall (bishop) (1828–1922), English Anglican clergyman
- Leslie Randall (actor) (1924–2020), English actor
- Lisa Randall (born 1962), American particle physicist
- Lynne Randall (1949–2007), Australian pop singer, changed last name to Randell.

=== M ===
- Marcus Randall, American football player
- Mark Randall, several people
- Marta Randall, science fiction writer
- Mary Ellen Randall, American computer programmer and businesswoman
- Meg Randall, American film actress
- Merle Randall, American physical chemist
- Mike Randall (disambiguation), several people

=== N - R ===
- Nikki Randall (politician), American politician from Georgia
- Paulette Randall, British theatre director
- Randall S. Randall, Australian businessman
- Robert Randall (disambiguation), several people

- Robert C. Randall (1948–2001), advocate of medical marijuana, founder of Alliance for Cannabis Therapeutics
- Robert Richard Randall (1750–1801), founder of Sailors' Snug Harbor in Staten Island, New York
- Robert Randall (photographer) (1918–1984), American photographer
- Robert Randall, joint pseudonym of American novelists Robert Silverberg and Randall Garrett

- Ron Randall, American comic book artist

=== S ===
- Samuel C. Randall, former mayor of Flint, Michigan
- Samuel J. Randall, US congressman from Pennsylvania and Speaker of the House of Representatives
- Semeka Randall, American basketball player
- Stuart Randall, American actor
- Stuart Randall, Baron Randall of St Budeaux
- Sue Randall, originally Marion Burnside Randall (1935–1984), American actress
- Suzanna Randall, German astrophysicist
- Suze Randall, American model, photographer, and pornographer originally from England

=== T - V ===
- Terry Randall, Australian rugby league footballer
- Thomas Randall, multiple people
- Tony Randall, American comic actor
- Vicky Randall, professor of political science

=== W - Z ===
- Walter Randall, British television actor
- William Randall, several people
