= John Randall =

John Randall may refer to:

- John Randall (Annapolis mayor) (1750–1826), mayor of Annapolis, Maryland and colonel in the American Revolution
- Sir John Randall (physicist) (1905–1984), British physicist, developer of the cavity magnetron
- John Randall, Baron Randall of Uxbridge (born 1955), British Conservative Party politician, former MP for Uxbridge and South Ruislip
- John A. Randall (1881–1968), President of the Rochester Institute of Technology
- John Randall (organist) (1715–1799), Professor of Music, Cambridge University
- John Ernest Randall (1924–2020), American ichthyologist, former director of the Oceanic Institute in Hawaii
- John Herman Randall, Jr. (1899–1980), American philosopher, author and educator
- John Witt Randall (1813–1892), American zoologist and poet
- John Randall (politician) (died 1869), American politician
- John Randall (Puritan) (1570–1622), English puritan divine
- John Randall (public servant), President of the National Union of Students, 1973–1975
- John Randall (shipbuilder) (1755–1802), English dockyard owner

== See also ==
- Jon Randall (born 1969), American country musician
- John Randle (disambiguation)
- Jack Randall (disambiguation)
