= Robert Randall =

Robert or Bob Randall may refer to:

- Robert C. Randall (1948–2001), advocate of medical marijuana, founder of Alliance for Cannabis Therapeutics
- Robert Richard Randall (1750–1801), founder of Sailors' Snug Harbor in Staten Island, New York
- Robert Randall (photographer) (1918–1984), American photographer
- Robert Randall, pseudonym used jointly by American novelists Robert Silverberg (born 1935) and Randall Garrett (1927–1987)
- Bob Randall (Aboriginal Australian elder) (1929–2015), Aboriginal Australian elder, singer and community leader
- Bob Randall (politician), Australian politician in South Australia
- Bob Randall (baseball) (born 1948), American Major League Baseball player, 1976–1980
- Bob Randall (rugby union)
- Bob Randall (writer)

== See also ==
- Robert Randal (c. 1766–1834), Canadian businessman and politician
