= John Frazee =

American sculptor and architect (1790–1852)

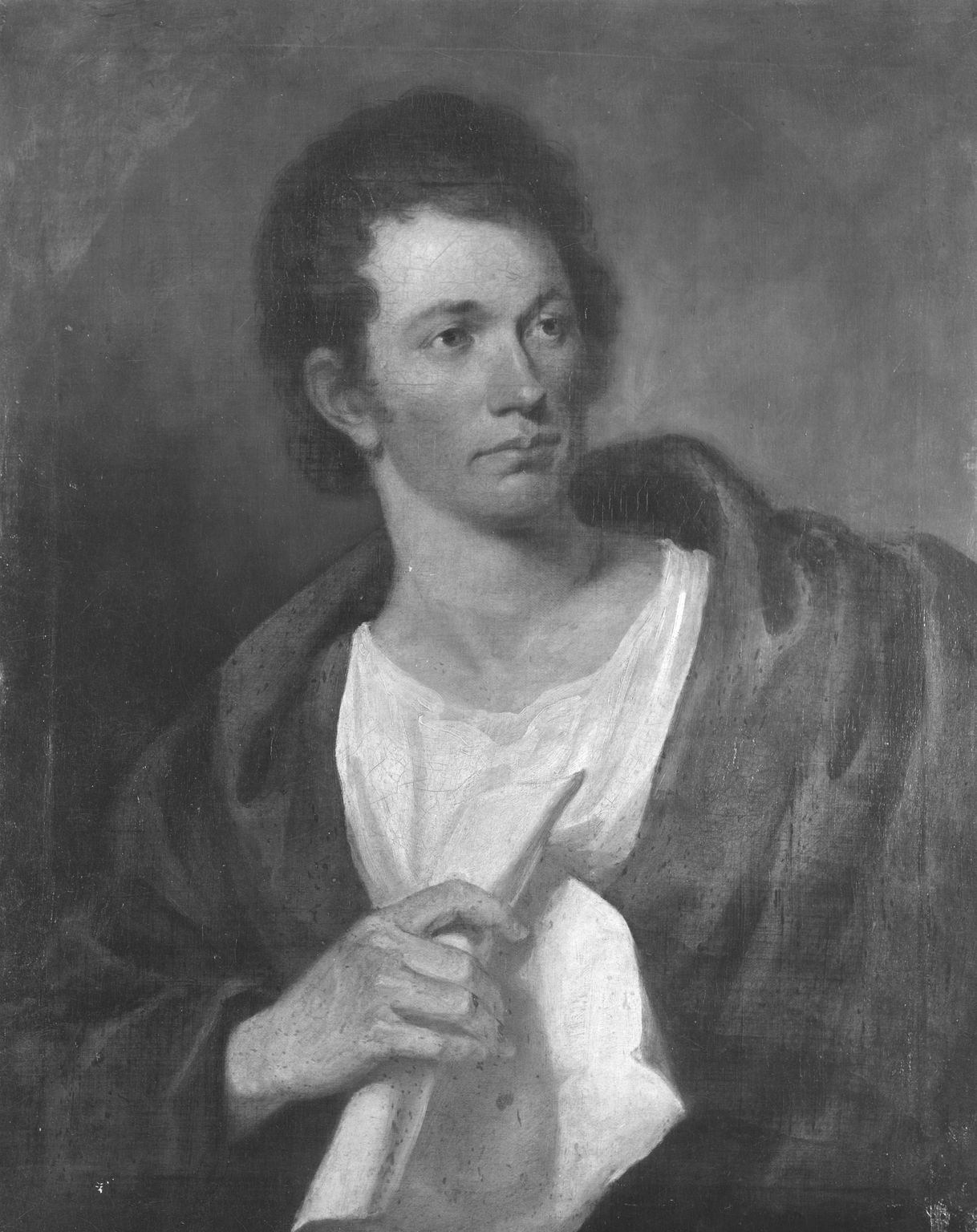
- Portrait of Frazee by Asher Brown Durand (c. 1823)
- Born: July 18, 1790; Rahway, New Jersey, U.S.
- Died: February 24, 1852 (aged 61); Crompton Mills, Rhode Island, U.S.
- Known for: sculpture, architecture
- Notable work: New York Custom House (Now Federal Hall); Thomas Paine Monument

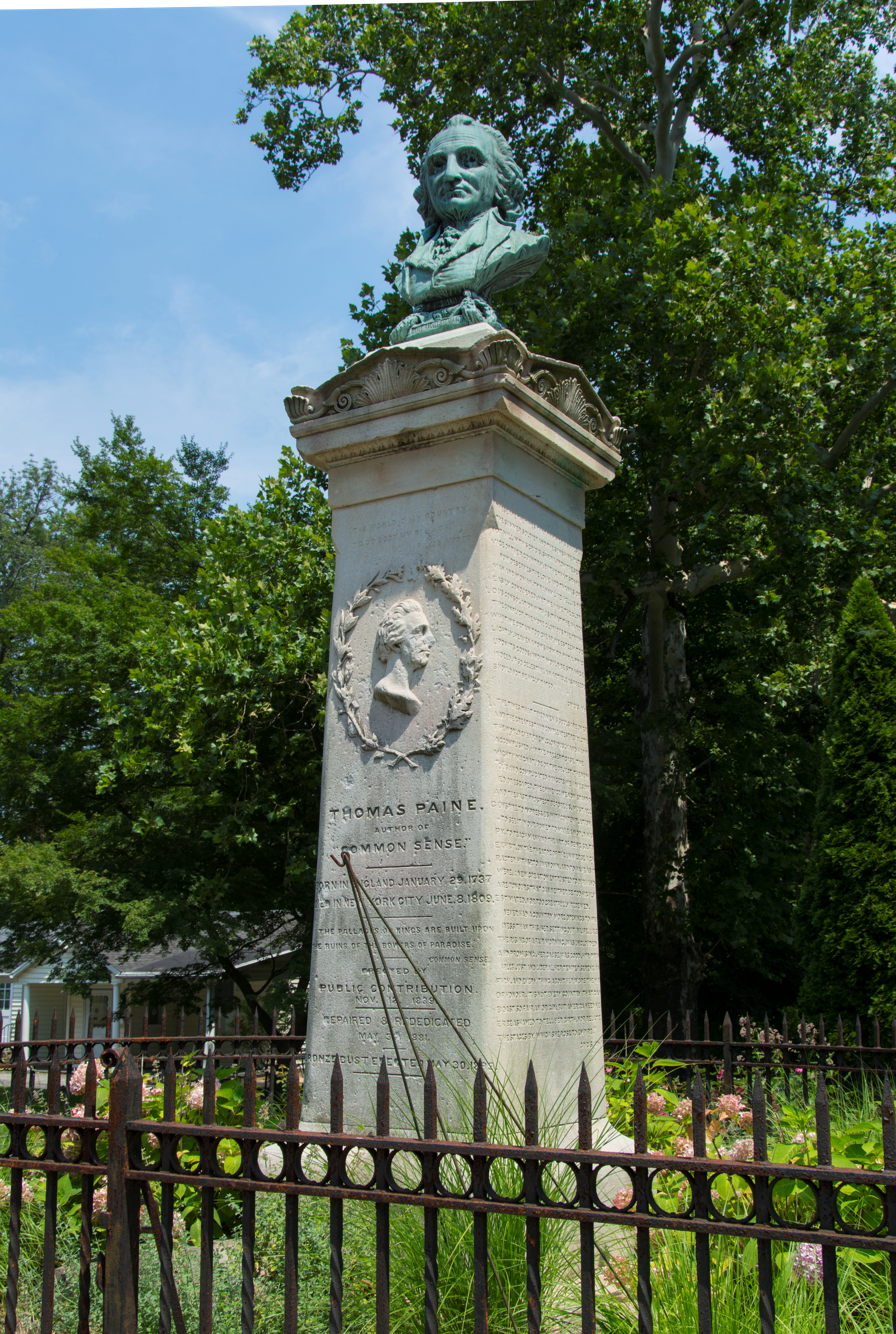
The Thomas Paine Monument in New Rochelle, New York

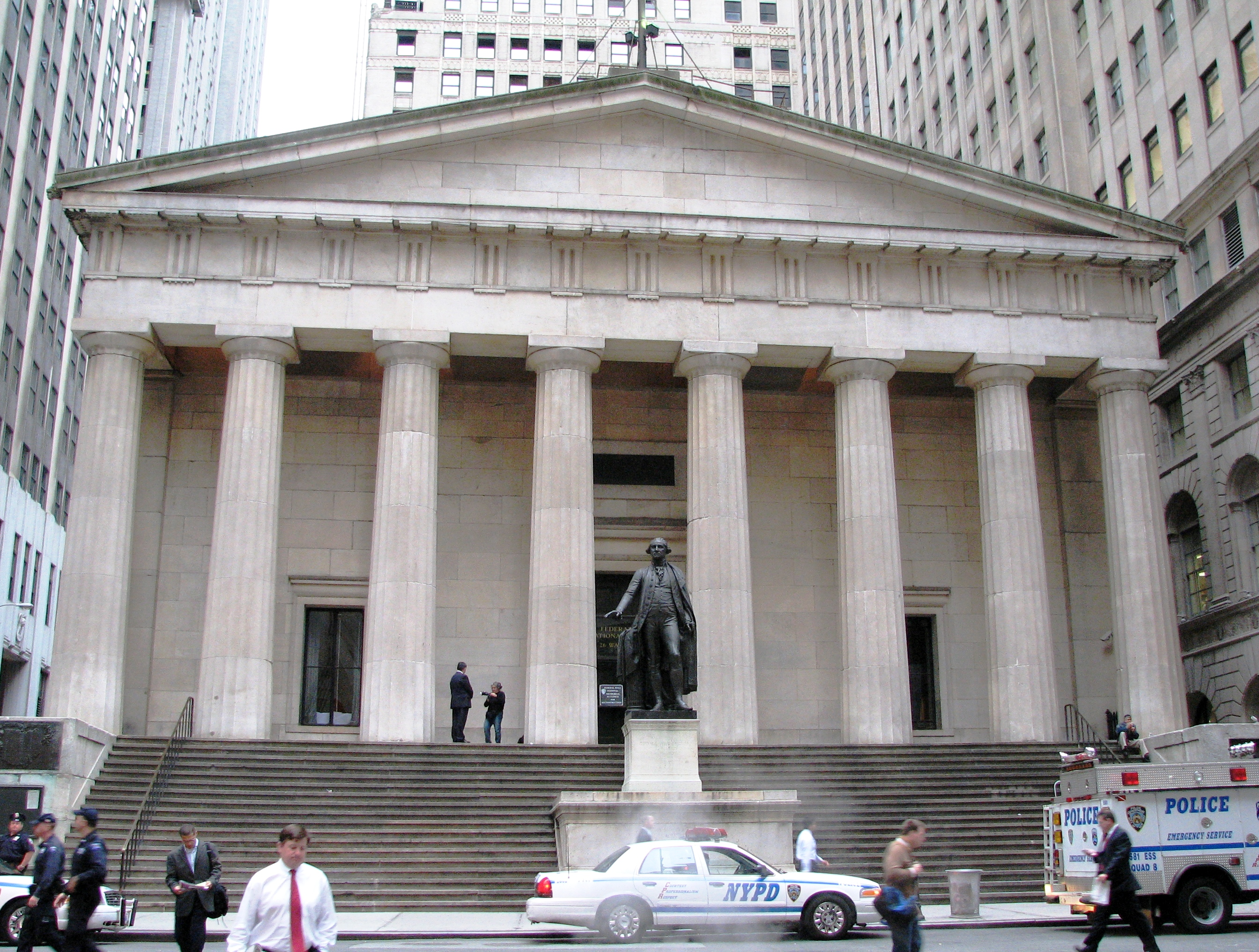
Designed by Frazee as New York Customs House, the building was converted into Federal Hall National Memorial.

John Frazee (July 18, 1790 – February 24, 1852) was an American sculptor and architect. The Smithsonian has a collection of many of his sculptures as well as paintings of Frazee by other artists including Asher B. Durand and Henry Colton Shumway.

He was born in Rahway, New Jersey, and worked in the Neo-Classic tradition. He is known as being one of the first successful native born American sculptors and "the first American born sculptor to execute a bust in marble". He is best known for his portrait busts, including of John Jay and Marquis De Lafayette. He carved sculptures for the Boston Athenaeum including of Chief Justice John Marshall and Daniel Webster. He also received a commission to design the New York Customs House, later used as Federal Hall National Memorial.

The sculptor Thomas Crawford began his career as a marble carver in Frazee's studio in New York City.

In 1826, he helped found the National Academy of Design.

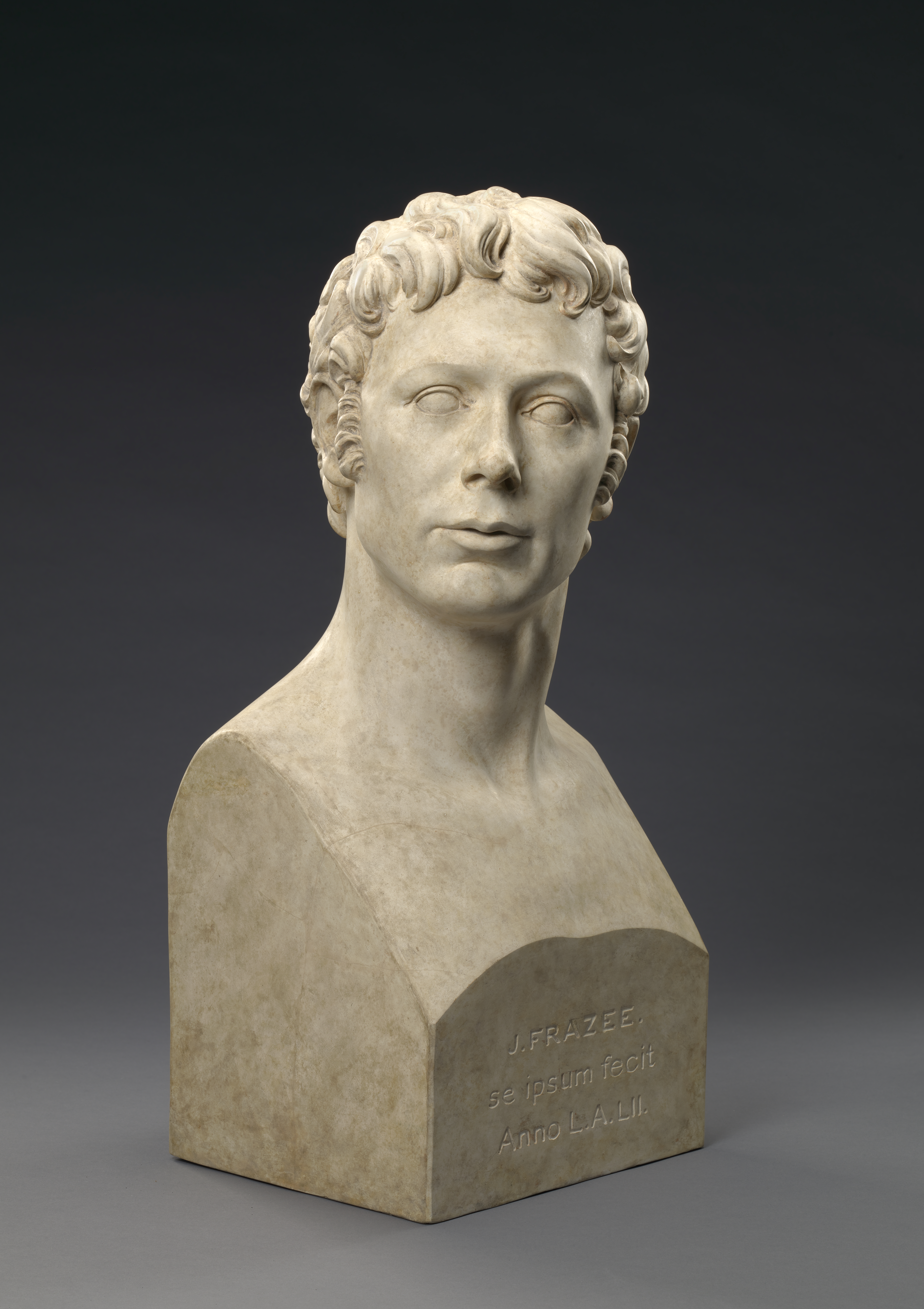
Self-portrait by Frazee, 1827

== Selected works ==
- early 1820s, Elbridge Gerry Monument
- 1824, John Wells (1770 – 1823) First sculpture portrait by a native born American sculptor
- 1827, Self-portrait sculpture
- 1831, John Jay sculpture
- 1831, John Henry Hobart (1775 – 1830) plaster sculpture
- 1832, Nathaniel Prime bust
- 1834, Daniel Webster marble sculpture
- 1834, Nathaniel Bowditch (1773 – 1838) marble sculpture
- 1834, Cadwallader D. Colden, (1769 – 1834) bas relief on tombstone
- 1835, John Lowell sculpture
- 1835, Thomas Handasyd Perkins (1764 – 1854) marble sculpture
- 1835, John Marshall sculpture
- 1836, Joseph Story sculpture
- 1836, Judge William Prescott marble sculpture
- 1836, William Prescott sculpture
- 1839, Monument to Thomas Paine in New Rochelle, New York, (The bronze bust of Paine by sculptor Wilson MacDonald was added in 1899)
- 1839, Thomas Paine memorial with bas relief
- 1840, William Leggett portrait on tombstone
- 1842, George Griswold III (1777 – 1859) bust
- 1847, Monument to Charlotte Canda (1828 – 1845)
- ca. 1850, Andrew Jackson sculpture
- Luman Reed sculpture
- William Wetmore Story (1819 – 1895) marble sculpture
- early 1830s, Robert R. Randall attributed to Frazee
