= Benjamin Randall (disambiguation) =

Benjamin Randall (1749–1808) was the founder of Freewill Baptist Connexion in the United States.

Benjamin Randall may also refer to:

- Benjamin Randall (Maine politician) (1789–1859), American congressman from the state of Maine
- Benjamin Randall (Wisconsin politician) (1793–1863), American politician from the state of Wisconsin
- Benjamin H. Randall (1823–1913), American politician from the state of Minnesota
