= William Randall =

William or Will Randall may refer to:

== Politics ==
- William H. Randall (1812–1881), U.S. Representative from Kentucky
- William J. Randall (1909–2000), U.S. Representative from Missouri
- William Peter Randall (born 1964), Canadian musician and municipal politician
- William Randall (MP) for Weymouth
- William I. Randall (1915-2012), Massachusetts Senator and Representative
- William C. Randall, politician in the U.S. state of Georgia, father of Nikki Randall

== Sports ==
- William Randall (baseball) (1915–2013), American baseball player
- William Randall (cricketer) (1823–1877), English cricketer
- William Randall (weightlifter) (born 1888), British Olympic weightlifter
- Will Randall (footballer) (born 1995), English footballer

== Others ==
- Will Randall (writer) (born 1966), English travel writer

== See also ==
- William Randell (1824–1911), South Australian pioneer and riverboat captain
- William Crandall (fictional character)
