= Richard Randall =

Richard Randall may refer to:

- Richard Randall (priest), English Anglican priest
- Richard Randall (physician), physician and colonial agent
- Richard John Randall, Australian artist
- Sir Dick Randall (Richard John Randall), Australian public servant
- SS Richard Randall, a Liberty ship

== See also ==
- Dick Randall (producer), American film producer, screenwriter, actor and assistant director
