= Cliff Williams (rugby union, born 1898) =

Welsh rugby union player

- Born: Clifford Williams; 20 April 1898 Llangennech, Wales
- Died: 28 May 1930 (aged 32) Cardiff, Wales
- School: Llangennech School
- Occupation: police officer

Rugby union career
- Position: Hooker
Amateur team(s)
Years	Team	Apps	(Points)
- Llangennech RFC
?-1925	Llanelli RFC		
1925–1927	Cardiff RFC		
–	Glamorgan Police RFC		
–	Royal Navy		
–	Bargoed RFC		
International career
Years	Team	Apps	(Points)
1924–1925	Wales	2	(0)

Clifford Williams (20 April 1898 – 28 May 1930) was a Welsh international rugby union hooker who played club rugby most notably for Llanelli and Cardiff. Williams played two matches for Wales, against New Zealand in 1924 and England in 1925.

== Personal history ==
Williams was born in Llangennech in 1898, becoming a collier on leaving school. He served in the Royal Navy during the First World War, and on return to civilian duties he joined the Glamorgan Constabulary. He died at the age of 32, shortly after his marriage.

== Rugby career ==
Williams first played rugby as a schoolboy, representing Llangennech School, before progressing to the Llangennech club. He switched to first-class side Llanelli, and while at the club he was first selected for the Wales national side in a game against the 1924 touring New Zealanders. Initially the Aberavon forward, Bob Randall, had been the preferred choice as hooker, but withdrew with a knee injury, allowing Williams to take his place. The match was a one-sided affair with Wales outclassed in speed and combination, but the Welsh forwards worked tirelessly against a much heavier pack. The game ended 19–0 to New Zealand.

Just three days later, on 2 December, Williams faced the New Zealand 'All Blacks' again, this time as part of his club team Llanelli. Williams, along with Albert Jenkins and Ernie Finch, who were also part of the Wales team that faced New Zealand, inspired the team in a close encounter. It was only some poor Llanelli kicking that cost the club team a victory over an exceptional touring side.

Williams won his second and final cap in the England encounter of the 1925 Five Nations Championship. The next season, Williams switched club to Cardiff, spending two years and making 39 appearances for the 'Blue and Blacks'. His time with the Royal Navy and Glamorgan Constabulary, saw him represent the rugby teams of both.

== Bibliography ==
- Billot, John (1972). All Blacks in Wales. Ferndale: Ron Jones Publications.
- Hughes, Gareth (1986). The Scarlets: A History of Llanelli Rugby Club. Llanelli: Llanelli Borough Council. ISBN 0-906821-05-3.
- Jenkins, John M.; et al. (1991). Who's Who of Welsh International Rugby Players. Wrexham: Bridge Books. ISBN 1-872424-10-4.
- Smith, David; Williams, Gareth (1980). Fields of Praise: The Official History of The Welsh Rugby Union. Cardiff: University of Wales Press. ISBN 0-7083-0766-3.
