= Nikki Randall =

Nikki Randall may refer to:

- Nikki Randall (actress) (born 1964), pornographic actress
- Nikki Randall (politician) (born 1972), Democratic member of the Georgia House of Representatives
