= George Randall =

George Randall may refer to:

- George Randall (RAF officer) (1899–?), British World War I flying ace
- George Randall (politician) (1832–1908), businessman and politician in Ontario, Canada
- George Morton Randall (1841–1918), U.S. Army officer
- George M. Randall (bishop) (1810–1873), Episcopal bishop
- George Randall (actor) (1895–1955), Australian actor
