= John Randle (disambiguation) =

John Randle (born 1967) is an American football defensive tackle.

John Randle may also refer to:

- John Randle (physician) (1855–1928), West African doctor active in politics in Lagos, now in Nigeria
- John Niel Randle (1917–1944), British recipient of the Victoria Cross

== See also ==
- John Randall (disambiguation)
