= Georgia's 142nd House of Representatives district =

State district in Georgia, USA

Georgia's 142nd State House of Representatives district
Representative
Miriam Paris; D–Macon
- Demographics: 29.3% White; 64.6% Black; 3.7% Hispanic; 1.1% Asian
- Population: 53,551

District 142 elects one member of the Georgia House of Representatives. It contains parts of Bibb County, Georgia.

== Members ==
- Nikki Randall (2011–2023)
- Miriam Paris (since 2017)
