= United States Custom House (New York City) =

Office for imports assessment

Coordinates: 40°42′26″N 74°0′37″W

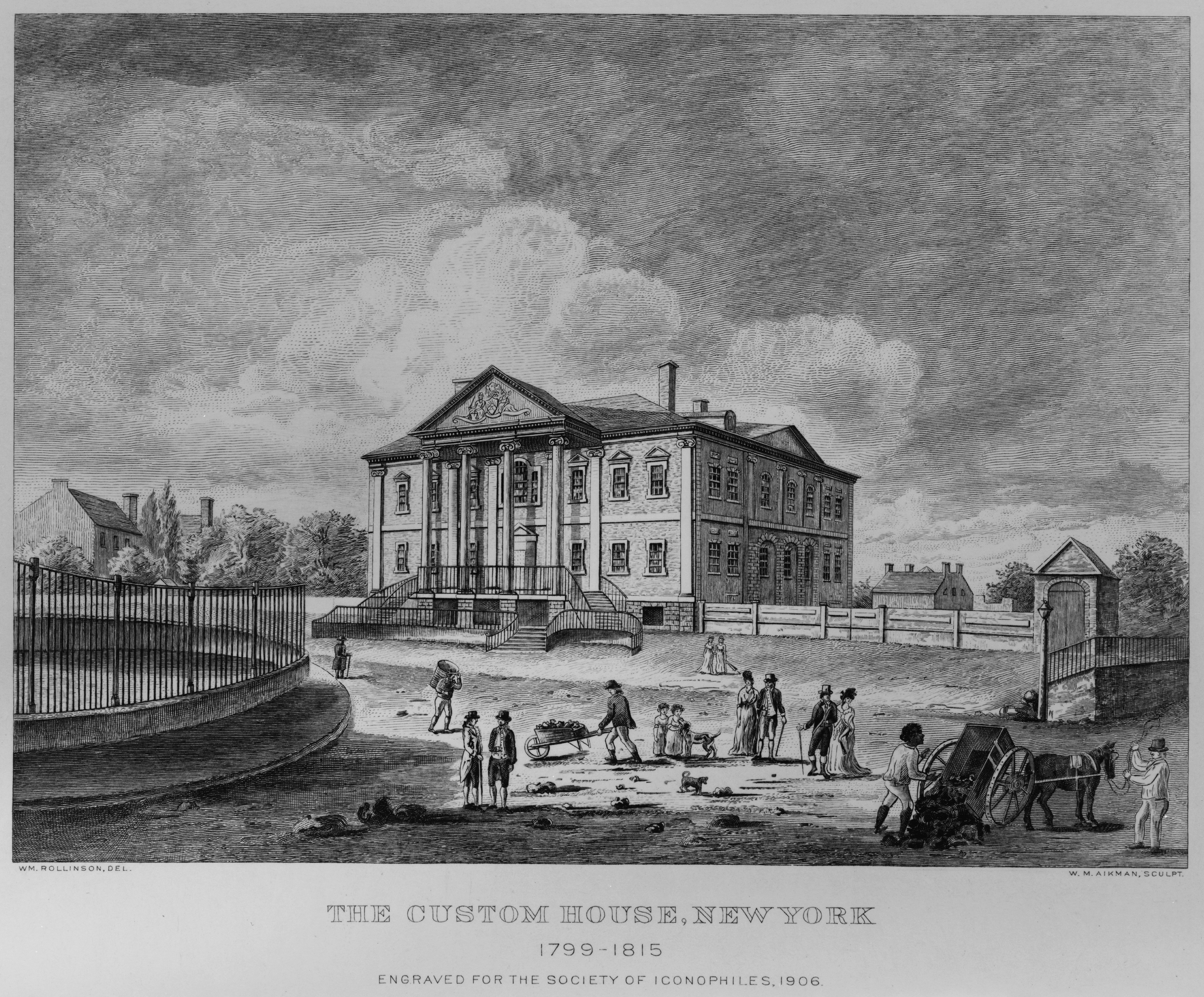
The Custom House, New York, 1799–1815

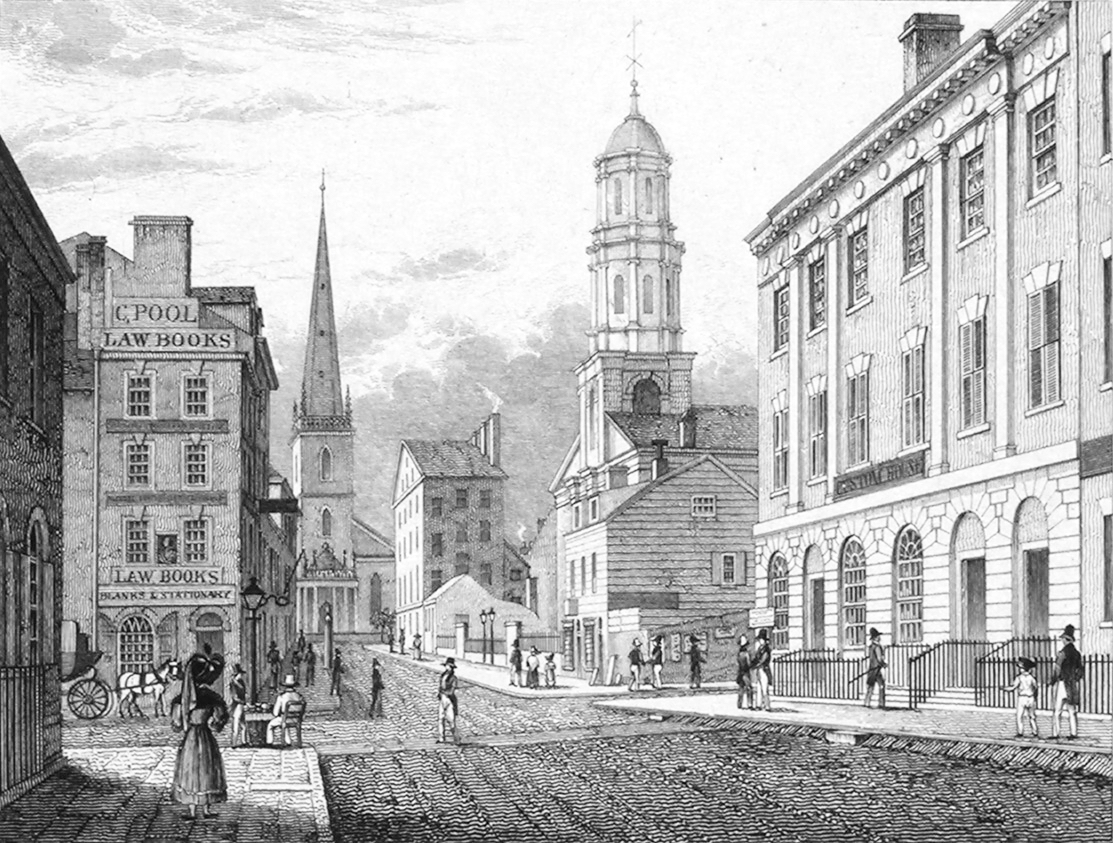
Converted bookstore and reading room at 26 Wall Street (right)

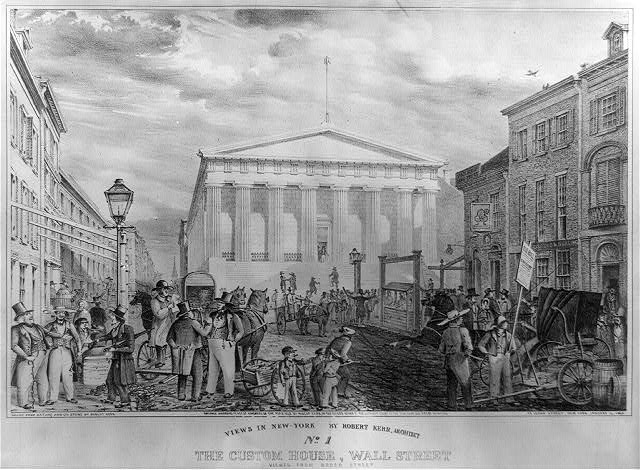
The 1842 Custom House, now Federal Hall National Memorial

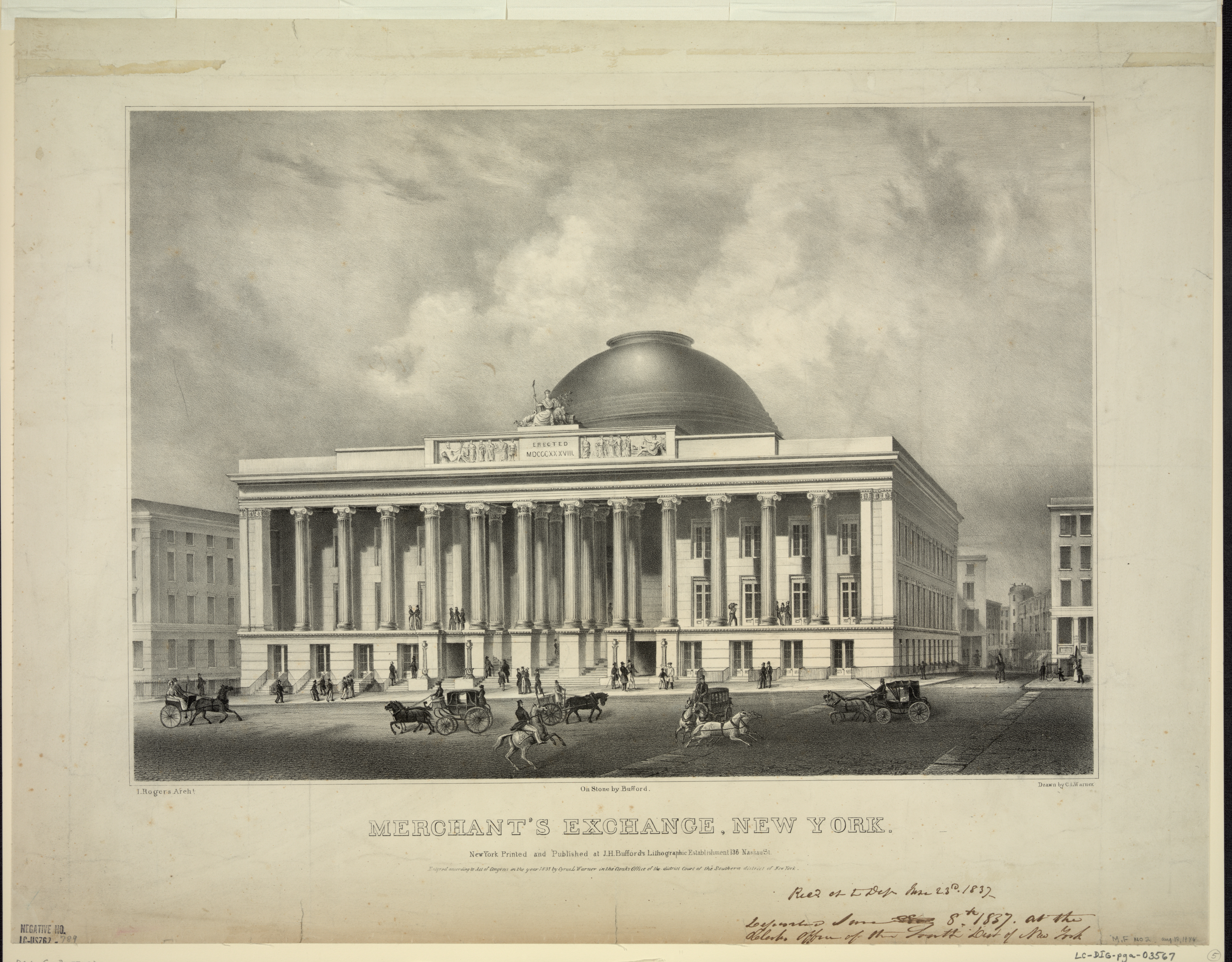
The Custom House moved to the former Merchants' Exchange Building in 1863.

The United States Custom House, sometimes referred to as the New York Custom House, was the place where the United States Customs Service collected federal customs duties on imported goods within New York City.

== Locations ==
The Custom House existed at several locations over the years. From 1790 to 1799, it was at South William Street, opposite Mill Lane, known as 5 Mill Street. From 1799 to 1815, it was in the Government House, roughly on the former site of Fort Amsterdam. From 1817 to 1834, it was in a converted bookstore and reading room on Wall Street at the east side of Nassau Street. That building was demolished for construction of a new Custom House at the same location, completed in 1842, which was designed by John Frazee, and is today designated Federal Hall National Memorial. From 1862 it was in the Merchant's Exchange Building at 55 Wall Street. In 1907 it moved into a new building, now called the Alexander Hamilton U.S. Custom House, built on the site where Government House sat earlier, on the south side of Bowling Green. The Customs Service signed a long-term lease with the Port Authority of New York and New Jersey at Six World Trade Center in 1970, and moved the custom house there in 1973. After the World Trade Center was destroyed during the September 11 attacks in 2001, employees were moved to various places in Manhattan, Queens, and Elizabeth in New Jersey.

The Customs Service was split into several agencies in 2003. One of its successors, U.S. Customs and Border Protection, planned to return to the new World Trade Center, moving into One World Trade Center.

== Importance ==
In the 19th century, the Port of New York was the primary port of entry for goods reaching the United States, and as such the Custom House in New York was the most important in the country. In 1853, for instance, it collected almost 75% of the custom revenue in the country. Until the passage of the 16th Amendment in 1913, which instituted a national income tax, the New York Custom House supplied two-thirds of the federal government's revenue. The amount of money passing through the Custom House made working there a prime position, and corruption was widespread. At one point, 27,000 people applied for 700 open positions in the Custom House.

== Patronage ==
Until the civil service reforms of the late nineteenth century, all Custom House employees were political appointees. The President appointed the four principal officers: Collector of Customs, Naval Officer, Surveyor of Customs, and Appraiser of Customs. The Customs House patronage was the subject of great debate during the Rutherford B. Hayes administration, as Hayes attempted to establish a merit-based system of appointments, while Senator Roscoe Conkling wished to retain the spoils system, under which he controlled the patronage there. One Collector of Customs, Chester A. Arthur (1871–1878), later became President of the United States following an assassination. Arthur was said to have made several times more income as a collector than he did as a lawyer, about $50,000 a year in his first three years in office.

== Bibliography ==
- Stokes, Isaac Newton Phelps (1915–1928). The Iconography of Manhattan Island, 1498–1909. Robert H. Dodd.
