= Henry Colton Shumway =

American painter (1807–1884)

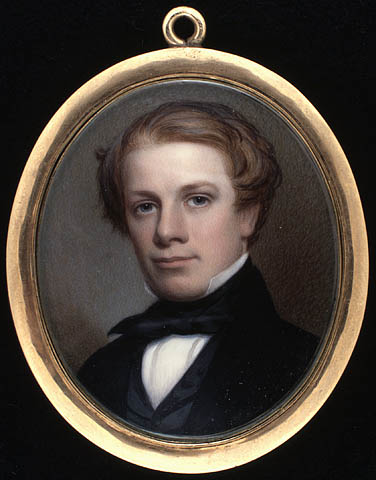
Miniature portrait by Henry Colton Shumway; a lock of the sitter's hair was sometimes included in the locket to add intimacy and personal quality to the keepsake

Henry Colton Shumway (4 July 1807 – 6 May 1884) was an American soldier and artist. He was born in Middletown, Connecticut in 1807 and died in New York City in 1884.

Shumway studied at the Academy of Design in New York City. He painted Governor John Trumbull, Daniel Webster, John Frazee and Henry Clay. At the height of his career, his paintings sold for three hundred dollars. With the advent of photography in the 1860s, Shumway and other artists stopped miniature painting and produced hand-colored daguerreotypes.

Shumway worked in Connecticut, New Orleans, and for a long period in New York where he exhibited his work from 1829 to 1860. He did miniature paintings. Later in his career he did large rectangular works.

== Sources ==
- "Schumway, Henry Colton". Benezit Dictionary of Artists. 2011.
