= Miriam Paris =

American politician

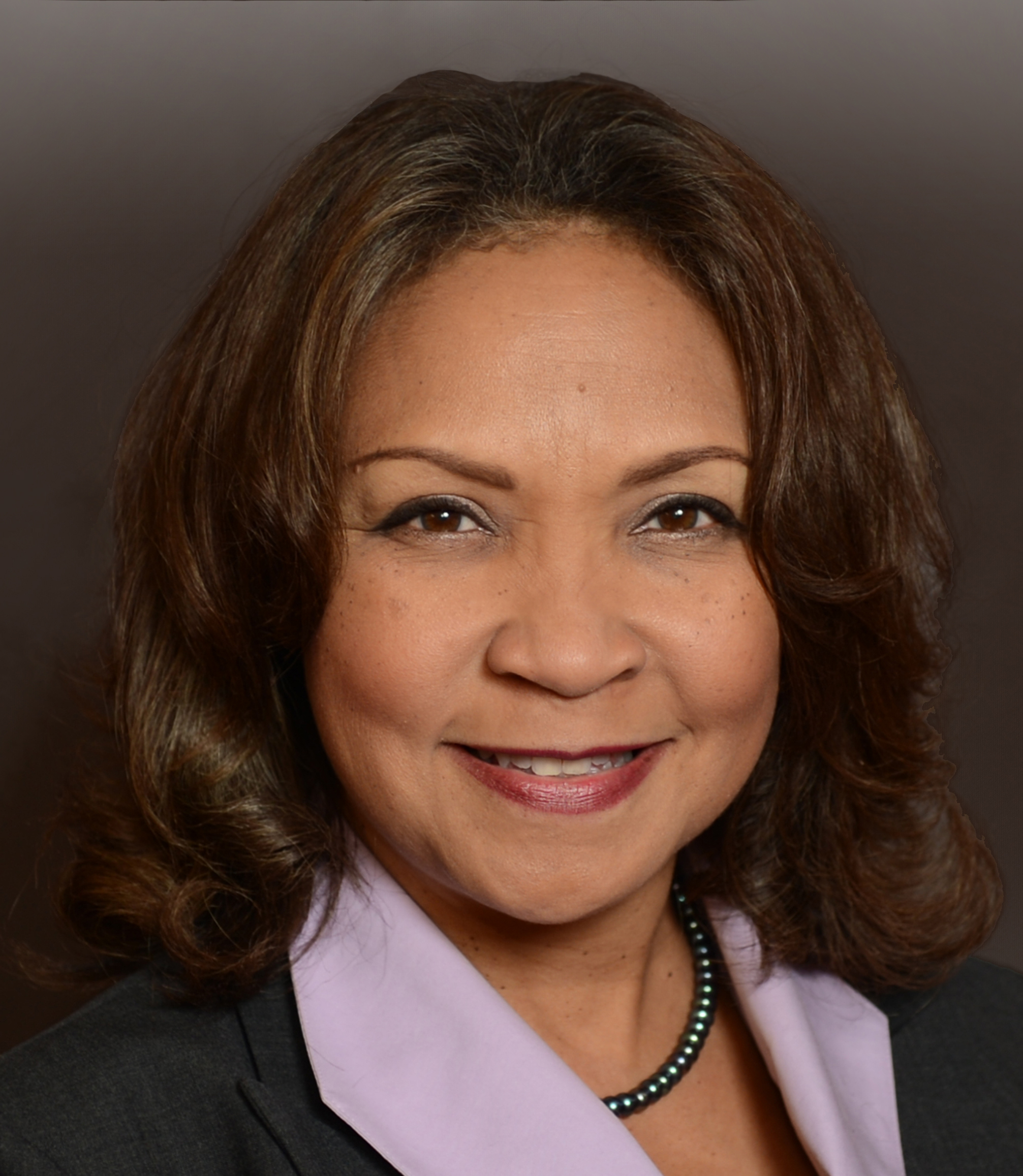

Member of the Georgia House of Representatives from the 142nd district
- Incumbent
- Assumed office January 9, 2017
- Preceded by: Nikki Randall

Member of the Georgia State Senate from the 26th district
- In office August 22, 2011 – January 14, 2013
- Preceded by: Robert Brown
- Succeeded by: David Lucas

Personal details
- Born: June 30, 1960 (age 66) Macon, Georgia, U.S.
- Party: Democratic

Miriam Lucas Paris (born June 30, 1960) is an American politician who has served in the Georgia House of Representatives from the 142nd district since 2017. She previously served in the Georgia State Senate from the 26th district from 2011 to 2013.
