= Henry Randall =

Henry Randall may refer to:

- Henry Randall (priest) (1808–1881), archdeacon of Bristol
- Henry S. Randall (1811–1876), American agriculturist and politician
- T. Henry Randall (1862–1905), American architect

== See also ==
- Harry Randall (disambiguation)
