= SS Richard Randall =

World War II Liberty ship of the United States

History

United States
- Name: Richard Randall
- Namesake: Richard Randall
- Ordered: as type (EC2-S-C1) hull, MC hull 2383
- Builder: J.A. Jones Construction, Brunswick, Georgia
- Cost: $866,525
- Yard number: 168
- Way number: 4
- Laid down: 2 October 1944
- Launched: 4 November 1944
- Sponsored by: Mrs. Edward C. Marshall
- Completed: 16 November 1944
- Identification: Call Signal: KYTN
- Fate: Laid up in the National Defense Reserve Fleet, Mobile, Alabama, 29 July 1949; Sold for scrapping, 23 October 1964

General characteristics
- Class & type: Liberty ship; type EC2-S-C1, standard
- Tonnage: 10,865 LT DWT; 7,176 GRT
- Displacement: 3,380 long tons (3,434 t) (light); 14,245 long tons (14,474 t) (max)
- Length: 441 feet 6 inches (135 m) oa; 416 feet (127 m) pp; 427 feet (130 m) lwl
- Beam: 57 feet (17 m)
- Draft: 27 ft 9.25 in (8.4646 m)
- Installed power: 2 × Oil fired 450 °F (232 °C) boilers, operating at 220 psi (1,500 kPa); 2,500 hp (1,900 kW)
- Propulsion: 1 × triple-expansion steam engine, (manufactured by General Machinery Corp., Hamilton, Ohio); 1 × screw propeller
- Speed: 11.5 knots (21.3 km/h; 13.2 mph)
- Capacity: 562,608 cubic feet (15,931 m^{3}) (grain); 499,573 cubic feet (14,146 m^{3}) (bale)
- Complement: 38–62 USMM; 21–40 USNAG
- Armament: Varied by ship; Bow-mounted 3-inch (76 mm)/50-caliber gun; Stern-mounted 4-inch (102 mm)/50-caliber gun; 2–8 × single 20-millimeter (0.79 in) Oerlikon anti-aircraft (AA) cannons and/or, 2–8 × 37-millimeter (1.46 in) M1 AA guns

SS Richard Randall was a Liberty ship built in the United States during World War II. She was named after Richard Randall, a privateer and founder of Sailors' Snug Harbor.

== Construction ==
Richard Randall was laid down on 2 October 1944, under a United States Maritime Commission (MARCOM) contract, MC hull 2383, by J.A. Jones Construction, Brunswick, Georgia; she was sponsored by Mrs. Edward C. Marshall, and launched on 4 November 1944.

== History ==
She was allocated to Isbrandtsen Steamship Co. Inc., on 16 November 1944. On 29 July 1949, she was laid up in the National Defense Reserve Fleet, in Mobile, Alabama. On 23 October 1964, she was sold for $54,240, to Pinto Island Metals Co., for scrapping. She was removed from the fleet on 3 November 1964.

== Bibliography ==
- "Jones Construction, Brunswick GA". ShipbuildingHistory.com. 13 October 2010.
- "Liberty Ships – World War II".
- Maritime Administration. "Richard Randall". Ship History Database Vessel Status Card. U.S. Department of Transportation, Maritime Administration. Archived from the original on 12 December 2019.
- Davies, James (May 2004). "Specifications (As-Built)" (PDF). p. 23.
- "SS Richard Randall".
