= Federal Hall =

Memorial in Manhattan, New York

- Federal Hall National Memorial
- U.S. National Register of Historic Places
- U.S. National Memorial
- U.S. Historic district – Contributing property
- New York State Register of Historic Places
- New York City Landmark
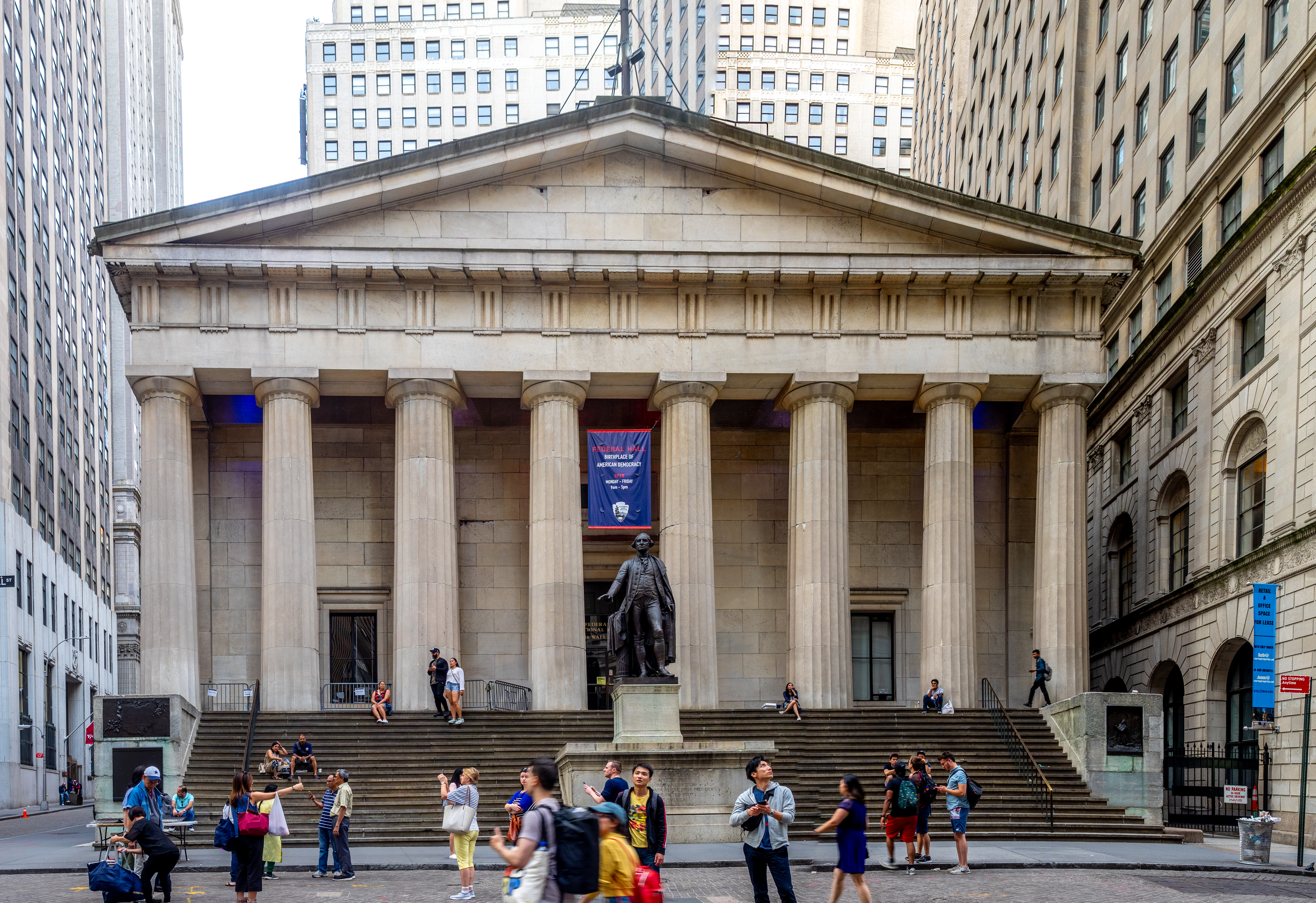
- View of Federal Hall Memorial in 2019
- Location of Federal Hall in New York City
- Location: 26 Wall Street; Manhattan, New York, U.S.
- Coordinates: 40°42′26″N 74°0′37″W
- Area: 17,200 square feet (1,600 m^{2})
- Built: 1842
- Architect: Town and Davis; John Frazee (Interior Rotunda)
- Architectural style: Greek Revival
- Visitation: 63,314 (2024)
- Website: Federal Hall National Memorial
- Part of: Wall Street Historic District (ID07000063)
- NRHP reference No.: 66000095
- NYSRHP No.: 06101.000085
- NYCL No.: 0047 (exterior), 0887 (interior)

Significant dates
- Added to NRHP: October 15, 1966
- Designated NMEM: August 11, 1955
- Designated CP: February 20, 2007
- Designated NYSRHP: June 23, 1980
- Designated NYCL: December 21, 1965 (exterior); May 27, 1975 (interior)

Federal Hall was the first capitol building of the United States established under the Constitution. Serving as the meeting place of the First United States Congress and the site of George Washington's first presidential inauguration, the building was located on Wall Street facing the northern end of Broad Street in Lower Manhattan, New York City, from 1703 to 1812. The site is occupied by the Federal Hall National Memorial, a Greek Revival–style building completed in 1842 as the New York Custom House. The National Park Service now operates the building as a national memorial commemorating the historic events that occurred at Federal Hall.

The original structure on the site was built from 1699 to 1703 as New York's second city hall. The building hosted the 1765 Stamp Act Congress, before the American Revolution. After the United States became an independent nation, it served as the meeting place for the Congress of the Confederation, the nation's first central government under the Articles of Confederation, from 1785 to 1789, and the building was expanded and updated. With the establishment of the United States federal government in 1789, it hosted the 1st Congress and the inauguration of George Washington as the nation's first president. In addition to other seminal legislation, the 1st Congress adopted the plan to create Washington, D.C. as the national capital, and to move to Philadelphia in the meantime. After congress left in 1790, the old hall was demolished in 1812.

The current structure, designed by Ithiel Town and Alexander Jackson Davis, was built as New York's U.S. Custom House, before serving as a Subtreasury building from 1862 to 1925. The Subtreasury building continued to be used as a governmental office building for a decade, and it opened as a public memorial in 1940. The building is constructed of Tuckahoe marble. Its architectural features include a colonnade of Doric columns, in addition to a domed rotunda designed by the sculptor John Frazee. In front of the building is a large statue of George Washington by John Quincy Adams Ward. The facade and part of the interior are New York City designated landmarks, and the building is also a contributing property to the Wall Street Historic District, listed on the National Register of Historic Places.

== First structure ==
In the 17th century, the area north of Wall Street was occupied by the farm of a man named John Damen. Damen sold the land in 1685 to captain John Knight, an officer of Thomas Dongan's administration. Knight resold the land to Dongan, who resold it in 1689 to Abraham de Peyster and Nicholas Bayard. Both de Peyster and Bayard served as mayors of New York.

=== City Hall ===
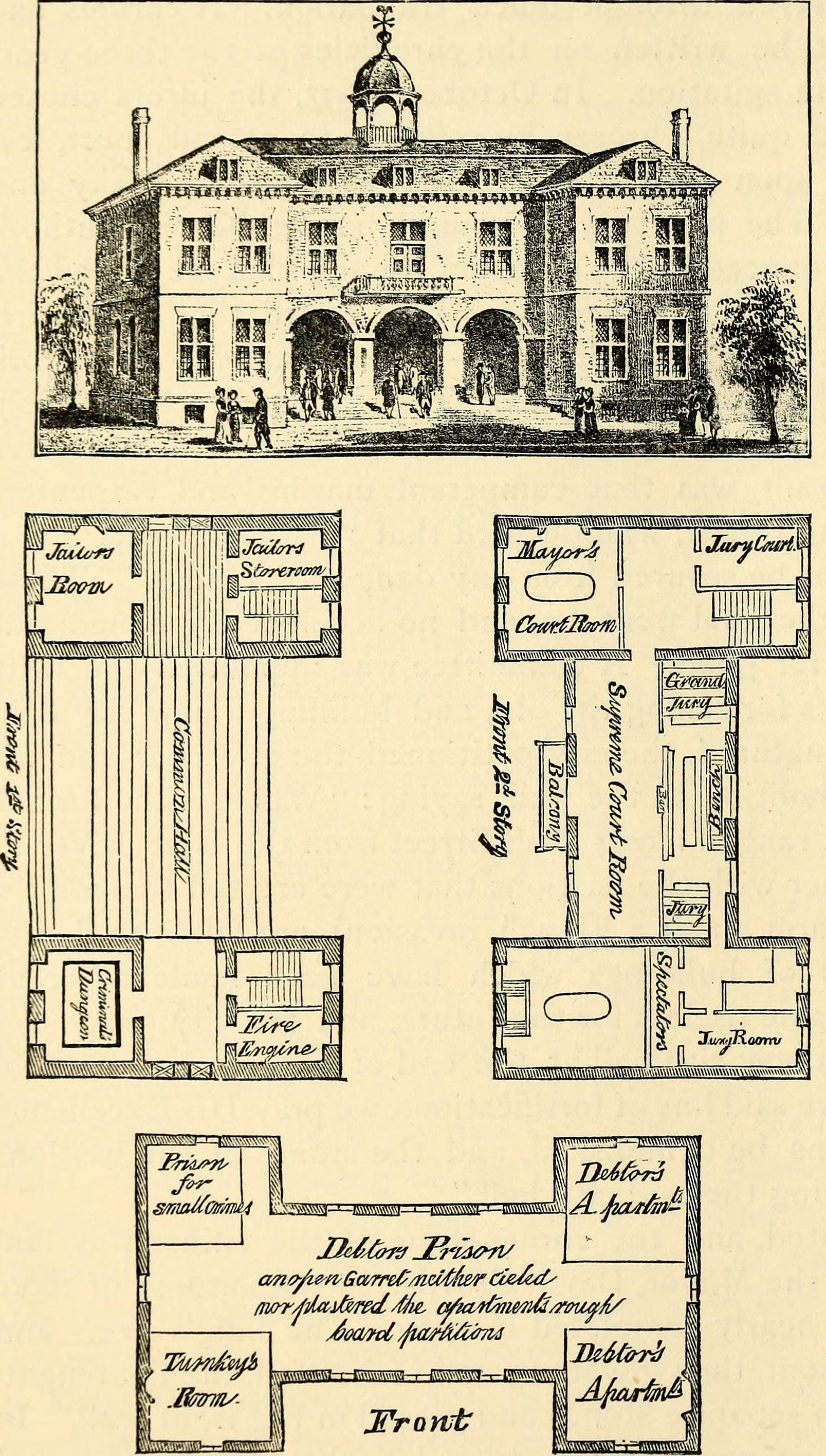
The old City Hall (1699–1703) with court and jail

The original structure on the site was built as New York's second city hall from 1699 to 1703, on Wall Street, in what is today the Financial District of Lower Manhattan. This structure had been designed by James Evetts to replace Stadt Huys, the city's first administrative center. It was two stories high, with wings extending west and east from a recessed central section. The stones from Wall Street's old fortifications were used for City Hall. Also housed at City Hall was a public library (which had 1,642 volumes by the year 1730), as well as a firehouse with two fire engines imported from London. The upper stories were used as a debtors' prison.

In 1735, John Peter Zenger, a newspaper publisher, was arrested for committing libel against the British royal governor and was imprisoned and tried there. His acquittal, on the grounds that the material he had printed was true, served as one of the bases for freedom of the press as it was later defined in the Bill of Rights.

City Hall was first remodeled in 1765, with the addition of a third story. That October, delegates from nine of the Thirteen Colonies met as the Stamp Act Congress in response to the levying of the Stamp Act by the Parliament of Great Britain. Drawn together for the first time in organized opposition to British policy, the attendees drafted a message to King George III, the House of Lords, and the House of Commons, claiming entitlement to the same rights as the residents of Britain and protesting the colonies' "taxation without representation". The Sons of Liberty briefly took over the building from the British during the American Revolutionary War in 1775, seizing British soldiers' munitions. The United States Declaration of Independence was read at City Hall on July 18, 1776, shortly after the country declared independence from Britain. After the war, City Hall became a meeting place for the Continental Congress.

=== Federal Hall ===
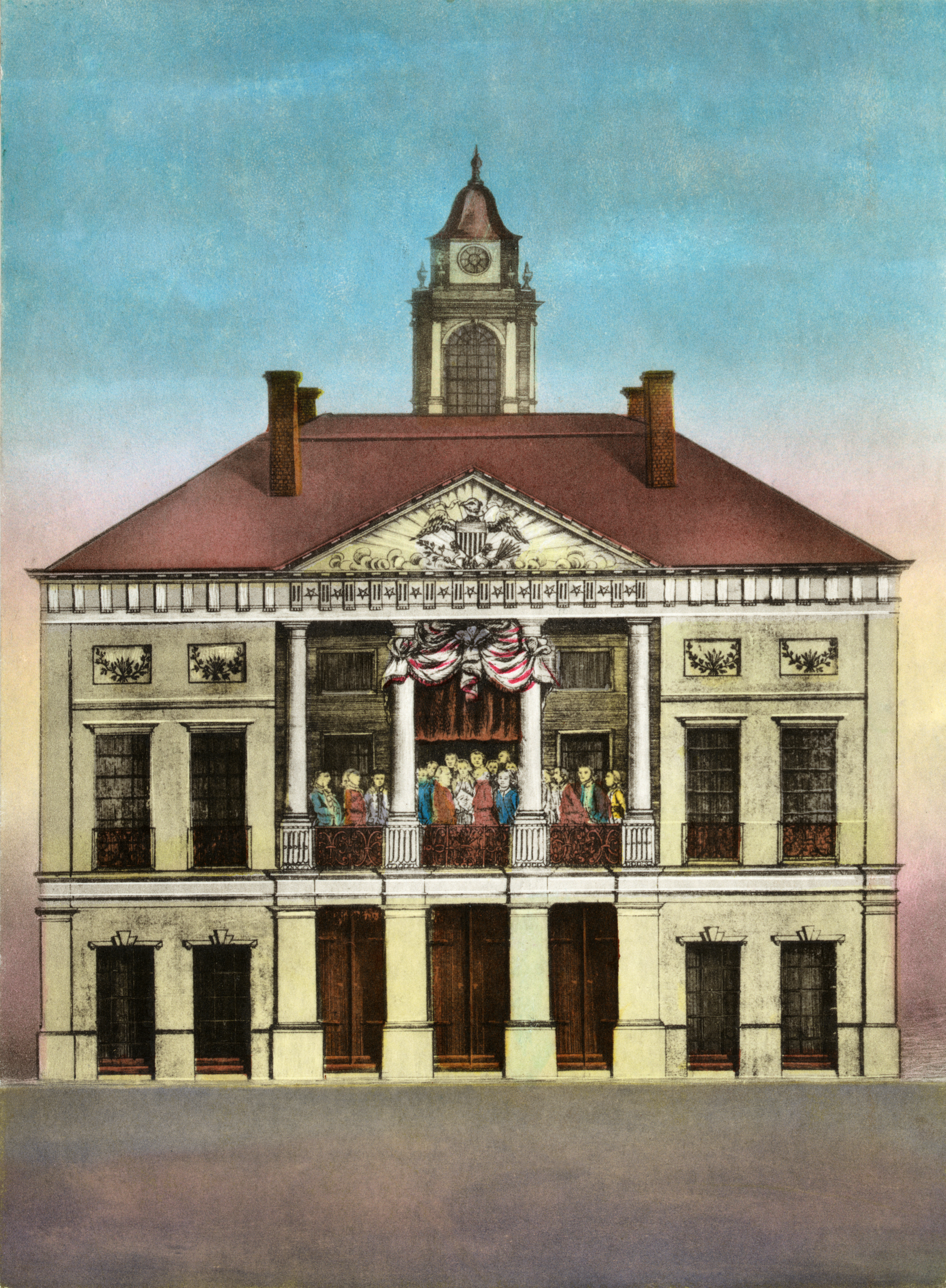
Federal Hall, Seat of Congress, 1790 hand-colored engraving by Amos Doolittle, depicting Washington's April 30, 1789, inauguration

After the American Revolution, City Hall was home to the Congress of the Confederation of the United States under the Articles of Confederation. The first meeting of the Confederation Congress took place at City Hall on April 13, 1784.

==== Design and construction ====
The Confederation Congress still needed a permanent structure, and the New York City Council and mayor James Duane wished for the city to be the United States capital. Private citizens and the government of New York City spent $65,000 (equivalent to $1.51 million in 2025) to convert the old City Hall into a congressional building. The Patriots felt that the building should be remodeled in a distinctively American style while also preserving the pre-colonial structure. Pierre Charles L'Enfant, a French architect who had helped the Americans during the Revolutionary War, was selected to remodel the structure. In December 1784, Congress voted to designate New York as the nation's capital. The Confederation Congress passed the Northwest Ordinance at City Hall in 1787.

L'Enfant's expansion, which took place between 1788 and 1789, was characteristic of Georgian-style designs, although he used larger proportions, and added American motifs. An arched walkway was built through the street-level basement, with four heavy Tuscan columns supporting a balcony. On balcony level, four high Doric columns were installed, supporting a pediment that depicted an American eagle with thirteen arrows (one for each of the original Thirteen Colonies). L'Enfant also created a loggia with a recessed gallery behind the columns, and he placed decorative swags above the second-story windows. The ground-story room for the United States House of Representatives measured 60 by 60 feet (18 by 18 m) across and about two stories high. A smaller room for the United States Senate was on the second floor, and L'Enfant built a third story, topped by a cupola and hip roof.

==== Usage ====
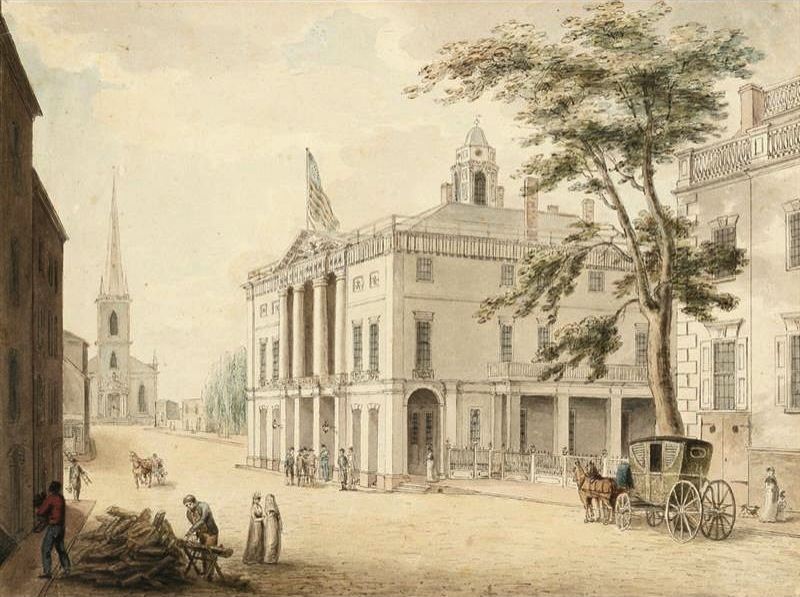
Archibald Robertson's View up Wall Street with City Hall (Federal Hall) and Trinity Church, New York City, from around 1798

The city moved all of its municipal offices out of the building in late 1788, but the New York Society Library's 3,500-volume library remained in the building for the time being. In 1789, the building became Federal Hall, the nation's first seat of government under the Constitution. The 1st Congress met there beginning on March 4, 1789. The first inauguration of George Washington, the first-ever inauguration of a President of the United States, occurred on the balcony of the building on April 30, 1789. Many important U.S. legislative actions occurred with the 1st Congress at Federal Hall. For example, on September 25, 1789, the United States Bill of Rights was proposed in Federal Hall, establishing the freedoms claimed by the Stamp Act Congress. The Judiciary Act of 1789 was also enacted in the building, setting up the United States federal court system.

In 1790, the United States capital moved to Philadelphia. Federal Hall was turned into quarters for the state assembly and courts. The Federal Hall building was one of the few structures in the area to survive an 1804 fire that caused $2 million in damage (equivalent to $48 million in 2024). Federal Hall was briefly converted back into a city hall in 1810. With the opening of the current New York City Hall in 1812, the New York City government no longer needed Federal Hall. The building was sold for $425 (equivalent to $10,236 in 2024) and was demolished. Part of the original railing and balcony floor, where Washington had been inaugurated, is on display in the memorial and was at one point held by the New-York Historical Society. Nassau Street had originally curved around the building to the west, while Broad Street had run to the east. Nassau Street was straightened after the building was demolished, and it runs to the west of the modern Federal Hall National Memorial.

== Second structure ==
The current Greek Revival structure was the first building that was specifically constructed for the U.S. Custom House for the Port of New York. The Custom House had been located in Government House, a converted residence on Bowling Green. The old building was described as "ordinary and inconvenient", and it had become overcrowded, prompting the federal government to lease additional space in 1831. Samuel Swartwout, the Customs Collector for the Port of New York, advocated in 1832 for "spacious, safe, secure" accommodations. Land for the new building was purchased incrementally in 1816, 1824, and 1832.

=== Custom House ===
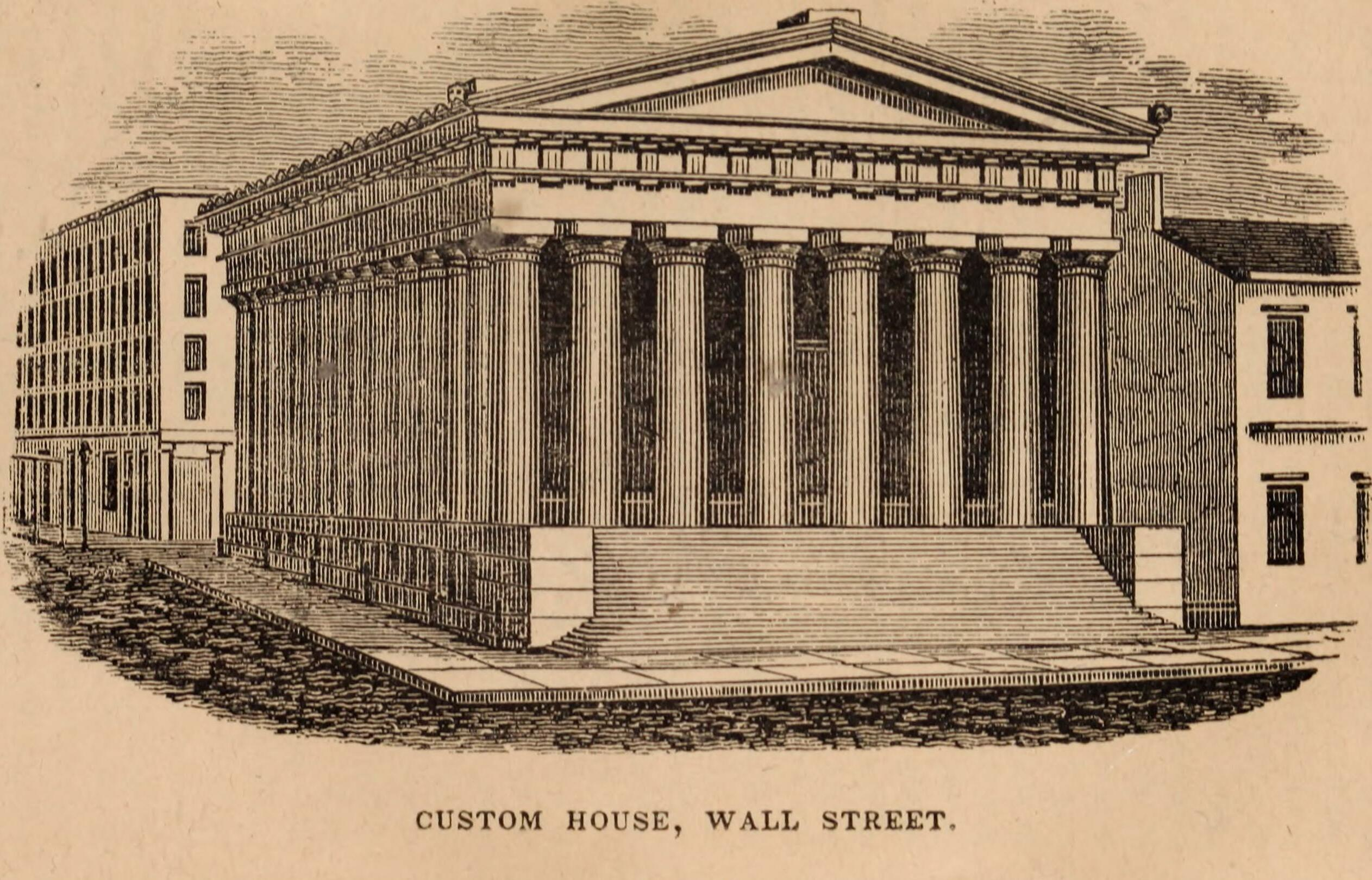
Custom House in 1850

Town and Davis—composed of Ithiel Town and Alexander Jackson Davis, then two of the city's most prolific architects—won an architectural design competition for the new Custom House building and was awarded the contract for the building's design in August 1833. Town estimated that the plans would cost $250,000 (equivalent to $8.64 million in 2024) if the Custom House building was made of granite, or $320,000 to $350,000 ($11.1 to 12.1 million in 2024) if it was of masonry, brick, and marble. The original design called for a colonnade of eight columns facing Wall and Pine Streets, square pilasters on Nassau Street, a massive coffered dome protruding above the roof, and a cruciform floor plan. The building would have also been decorated with details such as acroteria, metopes, and triangular pediments. Town suggested that Samuel Thomson, architect of the Administration Building at Sailors' Snug Harbor, be named the construction superintendent.

Ultimately, the building was constructed out of marble. Work on the Custom House began in January 1834, but the Customs Service then requested that the plans for the new building be downsized due to increasing costs. As a result, the dome was reduced in size and the original double colonnade on the facade was changed to a single colonnade. Thomson resigned in April 1835, taking the plans with him. Sculptor John Frazee was named the superintendent in Thomson's stead, and he worked to piece together Town and Davis's original plans. Frazee influenced the design of the interior and decorative details, and he modified plans for the attic to a full-height third story. Frazee got into a dispute with building commissioner Walter Bowne and was dismissed in 1840, but he was rehired in 1841.

The Custom House building opened in 1842 at a cost of $928,312 (equivalent to $30 million in 2024). Importers would perform their business at a counter in the building's central rotunda. The building came to be associated with political patronage. "The Seven Stages of the Office Seeker", an 1852 print by Edward Williams Clay, satirized how Democratic Party patronage under New York governor Martin Van Buren was centered around the Custom House. By 1861, the structure was too small to accommodate all of the customs duties of the U.S. Custom House for the Port of New York. The U.S. government decided to move the customs offices one block to 55 Wall Street, then occupied by the Merchants' Exchange. The federal government of the United States signed a lease with the Merchants' Exchange in February 1862, intending to move into the building that May. The customs offices were moved to 55 Wall Street starting in August 1862.

=== Subtreasury ===
After the relocation of the Custom House, 26 Wall Street was transformed into a building for the United States Subtreasury, one of six that handled federal funds on a regional level as part of the Independent Treasury System) independently of private banks. The Subtreasury desks were arranged around the rotunda of the building. Gold and coin storage vaults were placed along a passage near the north side of the rotunda. Bars were stored to the west, or left, and gold certificates and coins were stored to the east, or right. A vault for small change was also provided. A coin division was on the east side of the building, on the floor of the rotunda, toward Pine Street. Silver was stored in the northwest corner of the building, in the basement. An armory was placed on the upper stories, and various fortifications were mounted at the top of the building to protect the money. Adjoining the Subtreasury to the east was the United States Assay Office, a branch of the United States Mint that performed all Mint functions except creating the coinage. When the Subtreasury moved into the building in 1862, the structure held 70% of the federal government's money.

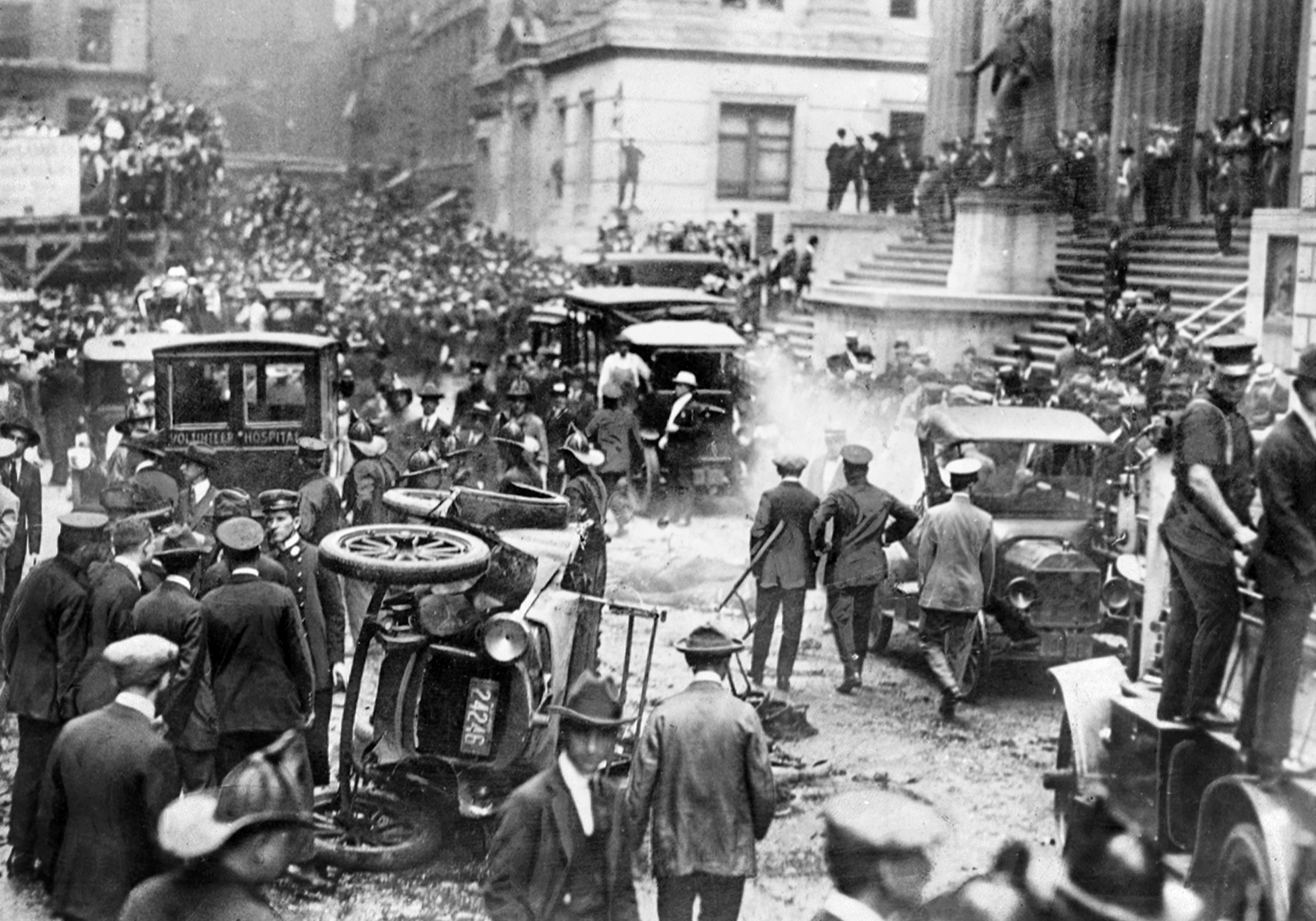
In the Wall Street bombing of 1920, the Subtreasury (Federal Hall Memorial) received no damage.

In 1883, John Quincy Adams Ward's bronze statue of George Washington was erected on the Subtreasury's ceremonial front steps. The statue was situated at the height of the original Federal Hall's balcony, where Washington had stood when taking oath of office, overlooking the crowds filling Broad Street up to Wall Street. By 1903, the building held over $275 million in gold, silver, and various other types of money; this amounted to nearly one-tenth of all of the United States' money at that point. A plaque memorializing the Northwest Ordinance was dedicated at the Subtreasury in 1905.

By 1917, the Subtreasury building held $519 million worth of gold and several million dollars more in coins. In the Wall Street bombing of 1920, a bomb was detonated across from the Subtreasury at 23 Wall Street, in what became known as The Corner. Thirty-eight people died in the surrounding area, though the Subtreasury was undamaged.

The Federal Reserve Bank replaced the Subtreasury system in 1920. The Subtreasury office closed on December 7 of that year, and the Assay Office leased the Subtreasury building to the Fed, which then was constructing the Federal Reserve Bank of New York Building two blocks north. The Fed started moving its monetary holdings from the Subtreasury to the new Fed building in May 1924. This prompted concern among local financiers that the federal government was planning to sell the building to a private entity. That July, nationalist group American Defense Society started advocating against a possible sale of the building.

=== Use by other government offices ===
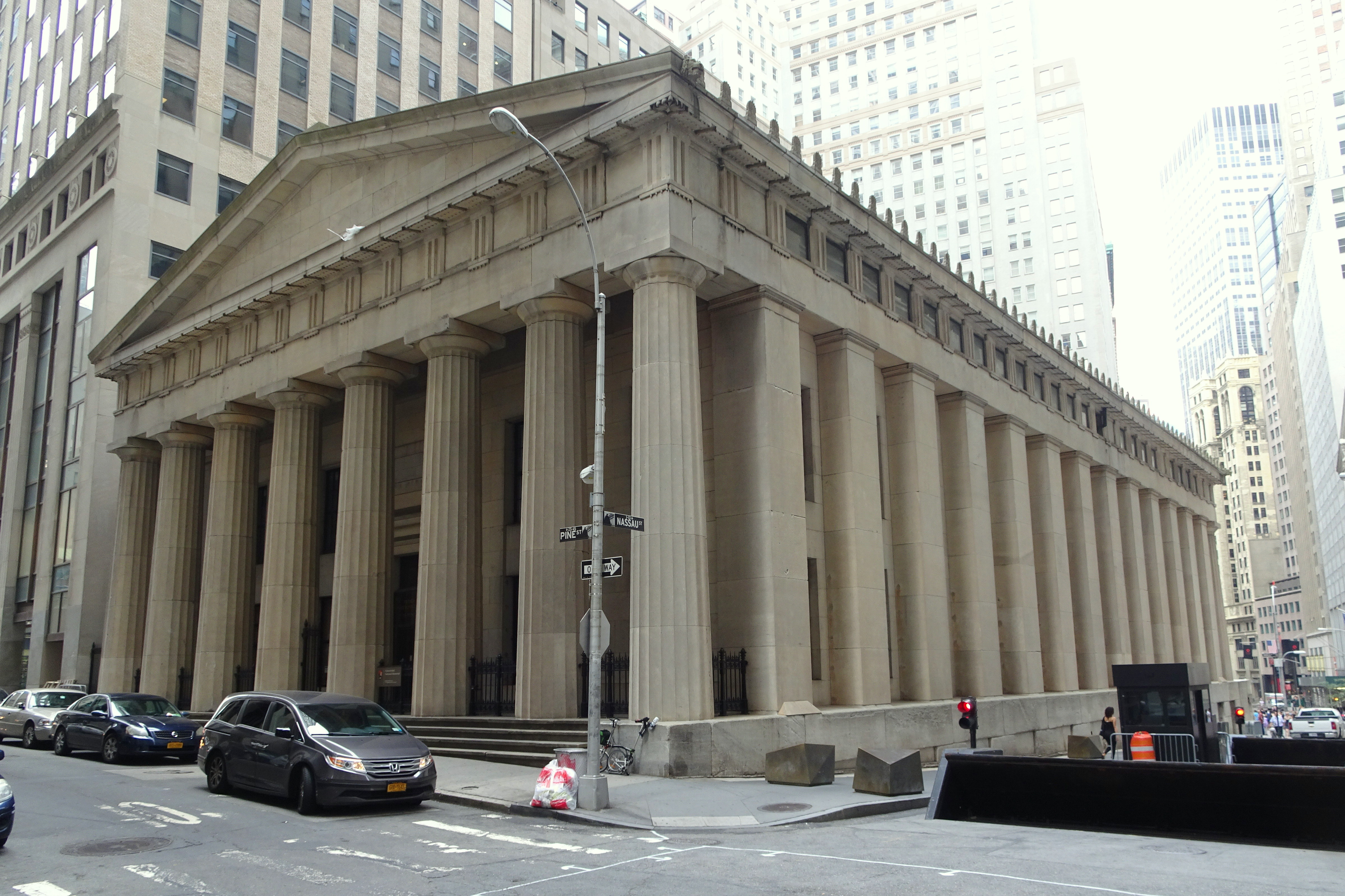
View from north

Ultimately, the government decided to retain ownership of the Subtreasury, using it as storage space for the Assay Office and as office space for other agencies. The government also considered moving the Bureau of Internal Revenue to the Subtreasury. In October 1924, federal officials announced they would move Prohibition enforcement agents' offices to the Subtreasury building, using the basement vaults to store confiscated alcoholic beverages. These plans were canceled the next month because of opposition from patriotic and historical societies. In early 1925, the City Club of New York appealed to Treasury Secretary Andrew Mellon to preserve the Subtreasury building. U.S. representative Anning Smith Prall proposed a bill that December to allocate $5 million for an expansion of the building.

A passport office opened on the Pine Street side of the building in March 1925. The Subtreasury was also used for events such as a 1926 party to celebrate the dedication of the Bowling Green Community House, as well as Constitution Day celebrations. The Brooklyn–Manhattan Transit Corporation (BMT) built its Nassau Street Line under the building in the late 1920s, and the Subtreasury was underpinned during the line's construction. The original foundation was only 8 feet (2.4 m) deep, so additional supports were installed underneath, descending 30 feet (9.1 m) to the bedrock. Congress passed legislation allowing the BMT line to be built slightly underneath the building. A water main under Nassau Street ruptured in October 1931, severely damaging some of the records that were stored in the basement.

A writer for The New York Times in 1930 characterized the Subtreasury as one of "the big little buildings of Wall Street", along with 23 Wall Street, the New York Stock Exchange Building, and Trinity Church. In the early 1930s, the United States Post Office Department proposed replacing the Subtreasury building with a post office, which would be a replica of Federal Hall as it appeared in 1789. At the time, the three post-office substations in Lower Manhattan could not adequately accommodate high demand from the surrounding office buildings. The department said much of the Subtreasury's space was unused because historical and patriotic societies had objected to most plans for the building. The Subtreasury continued to be used as a passport office through the mid-1930s.

=== Federal Hall National Memorial ===
==== 1930s to 1950s ====
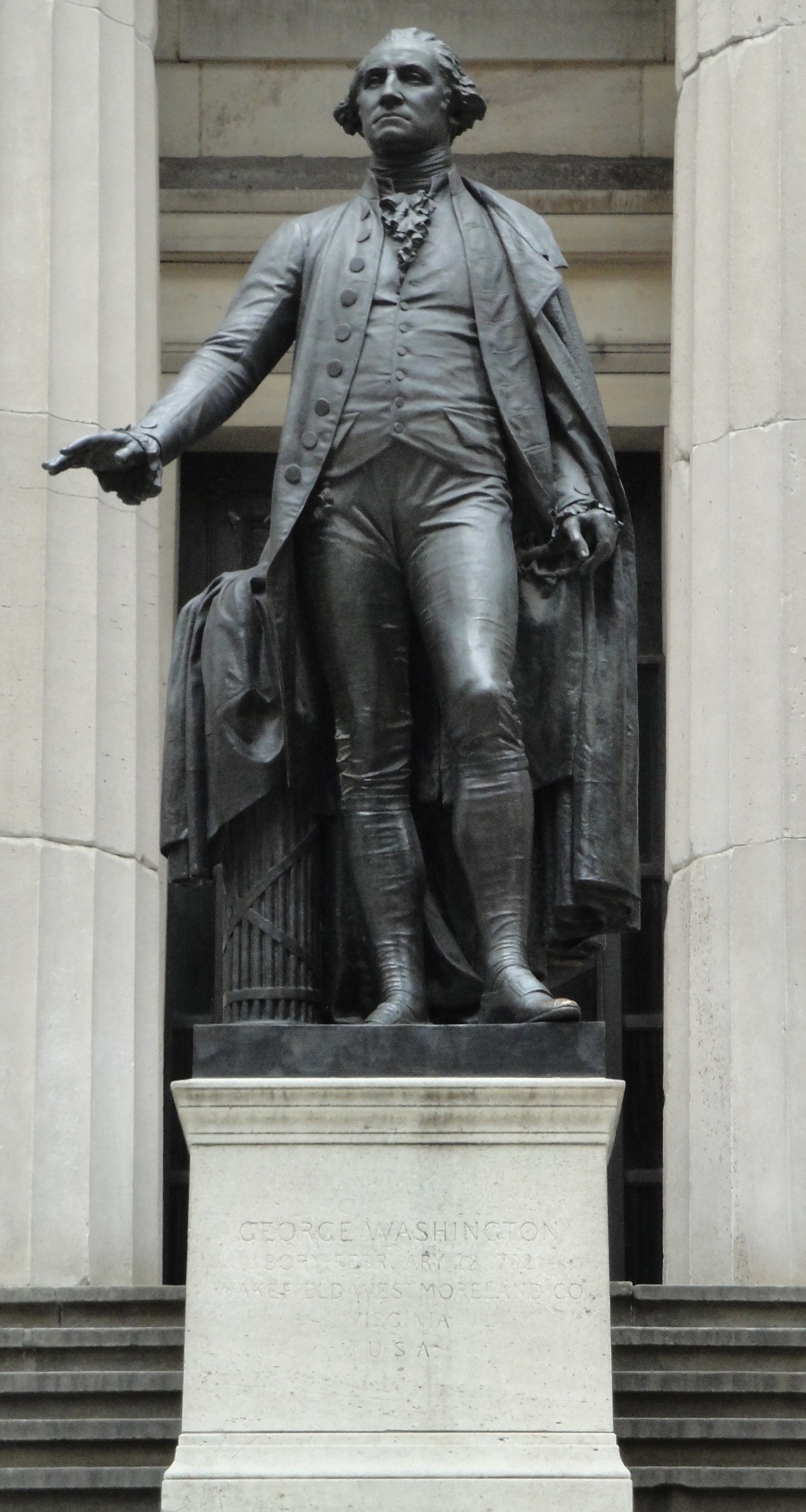
George Washington, 1882, by John Quincy Adams Ward, in front of Federal Hall National Memorial

In 1939, after the government announced plans to demolish the Subtreasury building, a group called Federal Hall Memorial Associates raised money to prevent this. On April 29, 1939, Secretary of the Interior Harold L. Ickes announced that the Subtreasury would become a historic site. The building was designated as Federal Hall Memorial National Historic Site on May 26, 1939, and an information bureau opened on the rotunda floor, with exhibits related to finance and the 1939 New York World's Fair. The next month, the National Park Service (NPS) took over the Subtreasury building. The memorial commemorated the first building on the site, rather than the extant Subtreasury building. Due to the building's status as a "national shrine", it did not accommodate governmental offices. After several months of negotiations, Federal Hall Memorial Associates was allowed to operate the interior as a museum in January 1940. The memorial opened on Washington's Birthday, February 22, 1940. The New York Herald Tribune said that, within the United States, Federal Hall Memorial was only matched by Mount Vernon and Independence Hall "in historical interest".

The building celebrated its 100th anniversary on Washington's Birthday, February 22, 1942. Among the other events at Federal Hall Memorial in the early 1940s were sales of World War II war bonds, Constitution Day celebrations, rallies in support of the United Service Organizations, and stamp sales. Events in the 1950s included a blood donation drive and a Salvation Army donation drive. In 1952, the United States House of Representatives' Subcommittee of the Interior voted to permit the rehabilitation of Federal Hall. The John Peter Zenger Room, a journalism exhibit, was dedicated at Federal Hall in April 1953. The next year, the U.S. government relocated the building's original wrought-iron fence into the basement because the Tennessee marble under it had started to buckle.

Since the building was owned by the federal government, Congress had to approve all renovations and restoration proposals. In 1954, the New York City Council passed a resolution asking Congress to establish a committee to provide suggestions for restoring Federal Hall, the Castle Clinton National Monument, and the Statue of Liberty National Monument. Federal Hall was re-designated as a national memorial on August 11, 1955. The same year, the federal government created the New York City National Shrines Advisory Board. The board first convened in February 1956. The government tentatively allocated $1.621 million for the restoration of Federal Hall, whose interior had become dilapidated. In February 1957, the board recommended allocating $3 million for the restoration of the three sites. By 1960, Interior Secretary Fred A. Seaton announced plans to restore Federal Hall within the next two years. He proposed that local civic groups raise $2.9 million, half of the projected cost, and that the government raise matching funds. The next year, Interior Secretary Stewart Udall announced that the federal government would start redeveloping the three historic sites in advance of the 1964 New York World's Fair. Federal government officials also installed a plaque in front of the building, dedicating it as a "national shrine".

==== 1960s to 1990s ====
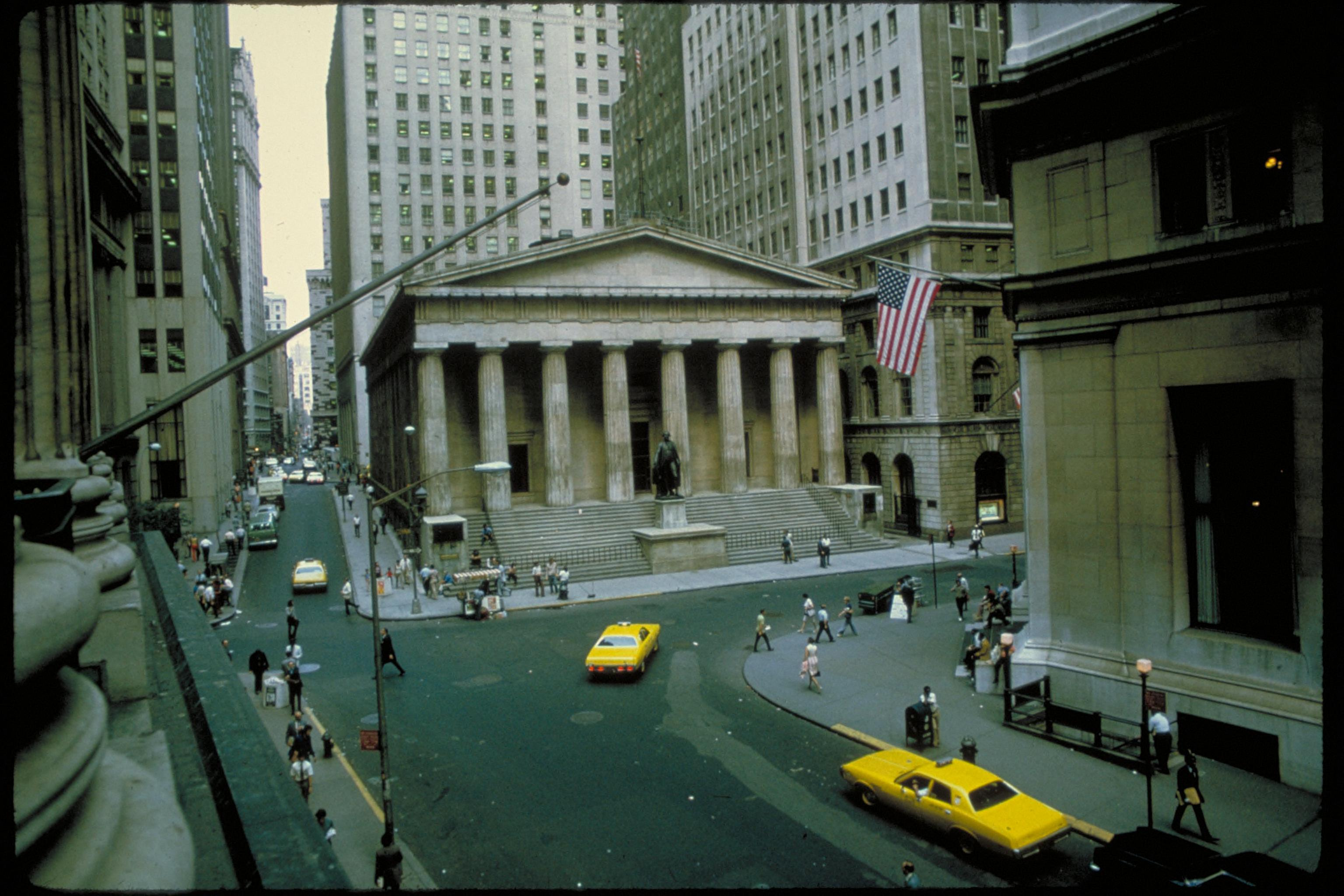
Federal Hall National Memorial as seen from the New York Stock Exchange Building

The New York City Landmarks Preservation Commission (LPC) designated the building's exterior as a landmark on December 21, 1965. The building was also added to the National Register of Historic Places (NRHP) when the National Historic Preservation Act, which created the NRHP, was signed on October 15, 1966. The building's location on Wall Street, and near the New York Stock Exchange Building, made it a "natural rallying place" as The New York Times described it. Its front steps were used for demonstrations, political rallies, President's Day celebrations, and union drives. Among these events were an anti-narcotics rally and a protest against the Vietnam War in 1970. After the building closed for restoration in 1968, the NPS said that loitering on the front steps developed into "more of a problem".

The building reopened to the public in 1972 as a museum. That year, ahead of the United States Bicentennial, the New York City Bicentennial Corporation issued a commemorative medal honoring the original Federal Hall, as well as New York City during the American Revolution. The LPC held hearings in 1975 to determine whether the interiors of Federal Hall's rotunda, the Morris–Jumel Mansion, and the Bartow–Pell Mansion should be designated as landmarks. The LPC designated all three as landmarks on May 26, 1975, and the New York City Board of Estimate ratified these designations that July. The NPS hired Phoebe Dent Weil to restore the George Washington statue on the front steps in 1978.

The Whitney Museum opened a temporary branch at Federal Hall in 1982. This was the third location of the Whitney's first satellite branch, which had previously been housed at 55 Water Street and the First Police Precinct Station House. The satellite branch occupied four galleries on the mezzanine of Federal Hall (around the central rotunda), while the NPS hosted history exhibits in other parts of the building. The Whitney closed the Federal Hall branch in 1984, eventually reopening at 33 Maiden Lane in 1988. During this decade, Richard Jenrette, the chairman of banking house Donaldson, Lufkin & Jenrette, started soliciting $500,000 in private donations to renovate Federal Hall, in conjunction with Federal Hall Memorial Associates. Although the group planned to renovate the rotunda into a reception area with contemporary furnishings, by 1985, only $73.000 had been raised and no contemporary furnishings had been acquired.

Federal officials announced in 1986 that Federal Hall would be renovated; the spaces would be cleaned and painted, and mechanical systems would be replaced. The memorial's second floor would contain two galleries about the Constitution of the United States, and an exhibit about the original building would be installed. Federal Hall hosted a reenactment of Washington's inauguration on April 30, 1989, the event's 200th anniversary. The reenactment, attended by president George Bush, was intended to raise $700,000 for the museum, which opened to the public after this event. In addition to Constitution-related exhibits, the museum hosted temporary exhibits such as a display of Hudson Valley artwork, a showcase of New York City designated landmarks, and an exhibit about the abolition of slavery in the United States.

==== 2000s to present ====
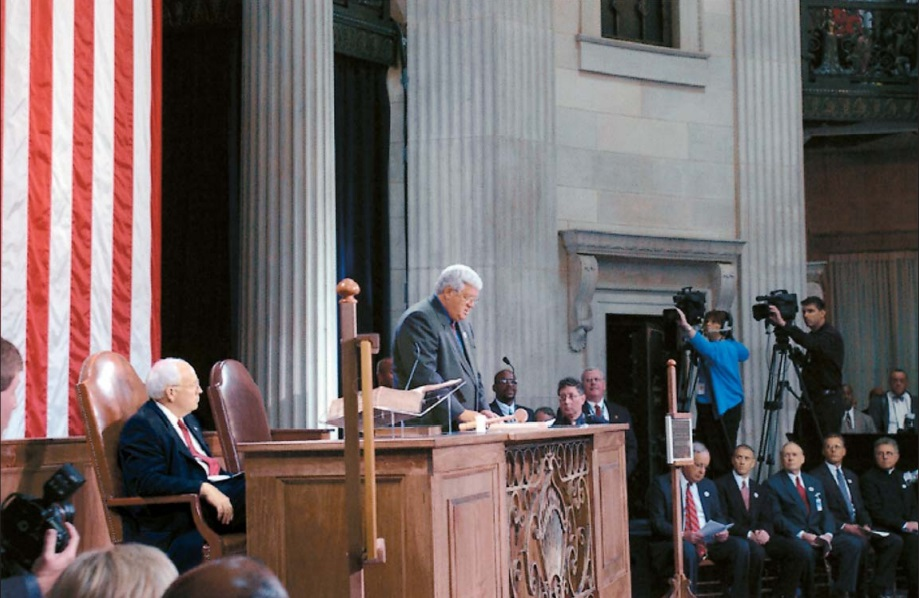
Congress convenes for a special session at Federal Hall National Memorial on September 6, 2002.

By the beginning of the 21st century, Federal Hall had numerous large cracks. During the September 11, 2001, attacks, which caused the nearby collapse of the World Trade Center's Twin Towers, 300 people sheltered at the memorial. Due to concerns over the building's structural integrity, Federal Hall was closed for one month following the attacks. When the building reopened, metal detectors were placed at the entrances. Meanwhile, the cracks in the building were exacerbated following the collapse of the World Trade Center, so the NPS received $16.5 million for repairs to the building in early 2002. On September 6, 2002, approximately 300 members of Congress traveled from Washington, D.C., to New York to convene in Federal Hall National Memorial as a symbolic show of support for the city; this was the first meeting of Congress in New York City since 1790. Four steel pilings were installed under one of the building's corners in 2003 after investigators found a 24-inch air gap beneath that corner.

The site closed on December 3, 2004, for a $16 million renovation, mostly to its foundation, and Einhorn Yaffee Prescott Architecture and Engineering was hired to repair and restore the building. Federal Hall National Memorial reopened in late 2006. The renovated memorial included a visitor center, showcasing other historical sites operated by the NPS in the New York City area. In 2007, the building was designated as a contributing property to the Wall Street Historic District, a NRHP district. The same year, the metal detectors were removed and replaced with magnetometers because the security screening process took too long, driving away visitors. This measure increased attendance fourfold. New York City mayor Michael Bloomberg and ABC News invited the 2008 United States presidential candidates, John McCain and Barack Obama, to a town hall forum at Federal Hall, though both candidates declined the offer. McCain did host his own town hall forum at Federal Hall in June 2008.

The American Express Foundation donated $75,000 in 2012 toward the restoration of the Washington statue. In 2015, the National Trust for Historic Preservation said Federal Hall's grand staircase would be renovated after the American Express Foundation had given a $300,000 grant. At the time, the steps had begun to fall into disrepair and showed signs of spalling and cracking. The work was to begin in late 2016. By 2018, local newspaper AM New York Metro wrote that "cracked walls, peeling paint and a rust-water-stained rotunda are among the deteriorating conditions that greet nearly 300,000 visitors who come there to learn about American history". Federal Hall National Memorial also had damaged floors and arches; the facade had begun to chip; and the columns had cracked and were showing signs of mold and discoloration. The cooling system was replaced in 2020. The NPS temporarily closed the memorial in July 2021 after finding cracked stone. As part of a permanent repair project, the building was to be covered in scaffolding for five to ten years. The memorial also continued to host events such as a pro-free speech rally in 2025.

== Architecture ==
Custom House's architectural plan from 1837

Federal Hall National Memorial was designed by architects Ithiel Town and Alexander Jackson Davis of Town and Davis, with a domed rotunda designed by the sculptor John Frazee. The building is constructed of Tuckahoe marble, which was sourced from Westchester County, New York. Town and Davis, who were proponents of various revival styles of architecture, designed the building in the Greek Revival style. The design reflects two prominent American ideals of democracy: The Doric columns on the facade resemble those of the Parthenon and are a tribute to the democracy of the Greeks, while the domed rotunda echoes the Pantheon and honors of the republican ideals of the ancient Romans.

The building occupies a 17,200-square-foot (1,600 m^{2}) site, which measures 90.25 feet (27.51 m) across on Wall Street and 197.5 feet (60.2 m) on Nassau Street. The site slopes up from Wall to Pine Street. The structure has a gross floor area of 23,199 square feet (2,155.3 m^{2}). It has two basement levels, three full above-ground stories, and an attic. The Subtreasury had been constructed with 22 or 25 rooms.

=== Facade ===
The facade of the building is made of marble blocks measuring 5 feet (1.5 m) thick. A set of 18 granite steps lead from ground level up to the rotunda. John Quincy Adams Ward's bronze statue of George Washington is placed on the building's ceremonial front steps. At the top of the stairs, a colonnade supports a plain triangular pediment. The lack of sculpture on the pediment may have been influenced by aesthetic considerations, as there were few "qualified sculptors" at the time of the building's construction, according to Elizabeth Macaulay-Lewis.

Next to the building's western elevation, there was originally a wrought-iron fence about 38 inches (970 mm) tall and 190 feet (58 m) long; it rested on a parapet of Tennessee marble measuring 22 inches (560 mm) tall. The fence, which was placed about 5 feet (1.5 m) in front of the building, was removed in 1954. When the building was used by the Subtreasury, guards were stationed in three turrets on the roof. These turrets contained grilles through which the guards could fire at invaders. There are also flat pilasters on the western facade, along Nassau Street.

=== Rotunda ===
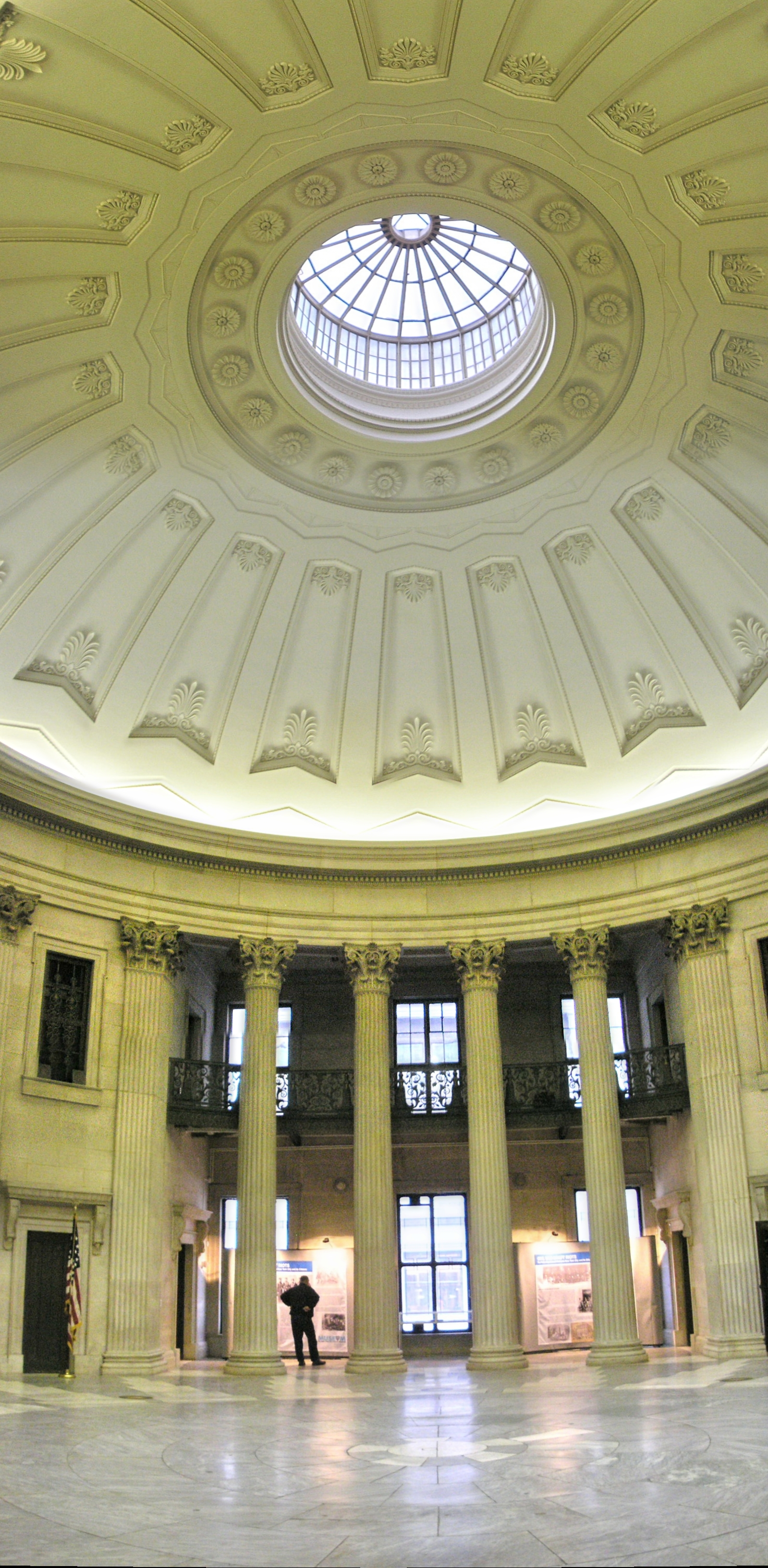
Main hall of the memorial, looking toward one of the four-column colonnades. Above is the saucer dome with a skylight at the center.

The main rotunda of Federal Hall is 60 feet (18 m) in diameter. The rotunda is designed as an amphiprostyle: it has balconies on four sides, but there are no columns between each balcony. The balconies have iron railings decorated with foliation (or carved-leaf shapes) and caryatids, and they also have barrel vaulted ceilings.

The wall of the rotunda contains four sections of colonnade, each containing four columns. Each of the columns was carved in one piece from a block of marble and measures 32 feet (9.8 m) high and 5 feet 8 inches (1.73 m) across. The southern colonnade leads to the main entrance, while the northern colonnade leads to the primary hallway of the building. The outer walls of the eastern and western colonnades contain plainly designed windows. There are gilded-iron balconies behind each colonnade. Between the colonnades are short sections of flat wall, situated between flat pilasters. The pilasters measure 25 feet (7.6 m) high. The rotunda had contained four Carrara marble counters when it was used as the Custom House.

The rotunda is topped by a self-supporting masonry saucer dome with a skylight at its center; the skylight cannot be seen from ground level, even though it protrudes above the rest of the roof. The dome contains narrow panels with curved bottoms, as well as anthemion motifs at their top and bottom ends. The underside of the skylight is surrounded by raised rosettes. The decorations were originally in a gold, blue, and white color scheme. The floor of the rotunda contains gray and cream marble blocks in concentric circles, surrounding a central stone slab where George Washington once stood.

== Activities and visitation ==
The National Park Service operates Federal Hall as a national memorial, which is open only on weekdays. The memorial is wheelchair-accessible via a ramp on Pine Street. There is tourist information about the New York Harbor area's federal monuments and parks, and a New York City tourism information center. The gift shop has colonial and early American items for sale. Normally its exhibit galleries are open free to the public daily, except national holidays, and guided tours of the site are offered throughout the day.

The memorial has several permanent exhibits. These include George Washington's Inauguration Gallery, including his copy of the Bible used to swear his oath of office; Freedom of the Press, the imprisonment and trial of John Peter Zenger; and New York: An American Capital, preview exhibit created by the National Archives and Records Administration. Among the items displayed are a piece of the balcony upon which Washington stood in his first inauguration. Various temporary exhibitions have also been shown at Federal Hall, such as the 2023 site-specific theatre performance The Democracy Project.

The memorial had an estimated 200,000 annual visitors by 2015, representing about one percent of the 15 million people who visited the intersection of Wall, Nassau, and Broad Streets every year. In 2024, the memorial had 63,314 visitors.

== Impact ==
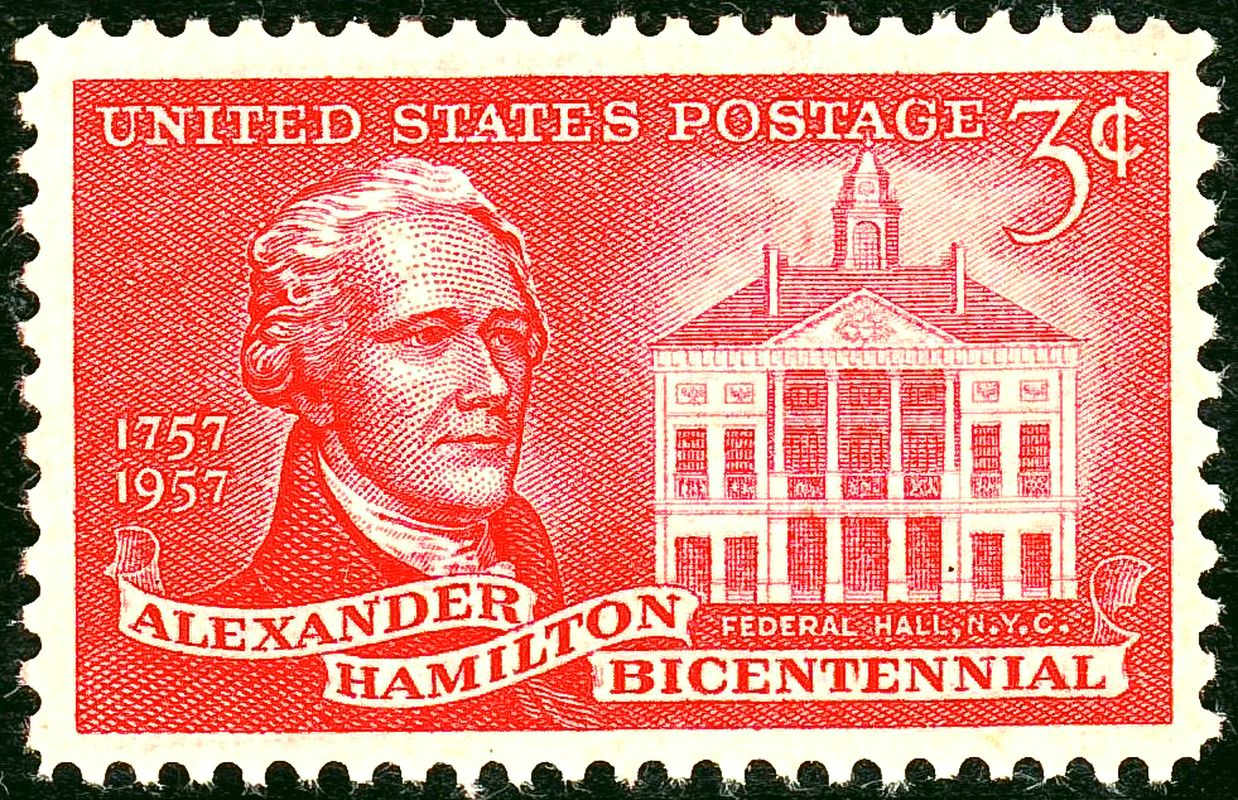
Stamp issue of 1957

The design of the first Federal Hall influenced the development of what became the Federal style. More directly, the building's architecture had helped inspire the design of the first Connecticut State Capitol. Of the second building, Gerard Wolfe wrote in his 1994 book New York, a Guide to the Metropolis, that the structure was "considered the Parthenon of public buildings in the city and possibly its finest Greek Revival-style building". The writer Elizabeth Macaulay-Lewis described the second building as "above all, New York's most eloquent reminder of the philhellenism of the 1830s and 1840s". Meanwhile, the AIA Guide to New York City called it one of the "institutional stars of New York's Greek Revival", along with Sailors' Snug Harbor in Staten Island.

Engraved renditions of Federal Hall appear on multiple U.S. postage stamps. The first stamp showing Federal Hall was issued on April 30, 1939, the 150th anniversary of President Washington's inauguration, where he is depicted on the balcony of Federal Hall taking the oath of office. The second issue was released in 1957, the 200th anniversary of Alexander Hamilton's birth. This issue depicts Hamilton and a full view of Federal Hall. The United States Postal Service issued a commemorative 25-cent stamp in 1988, the 200th anniversary of when New York ratified the United States Constitution. The stamp depicted the original Federal Hall, Wall Street, and Trinity Church's steeple.

== See also ==
- List of national memorials of the United States
- List of New York City Designated Landmarks in Manhattan below 14th Street
- National Register of Historic Places listings in Manhattan below 14th Street
