= Alexander R. François =

Louisiana reconstruction era American politician

Louisiana State Senate
- In office 1868–1869

Personal details
- Born: c. 1820
- Died: May 21, 1869 (aged 48–49)

Alexander R. François (c. 1820 - May 21, 1869) was a state legislator who served in the Louisiana State Senate during the Reconstruction era from 1868 until his murder in 1869.

== Career ==
François was born circa 1820 in St. Martin Parish, Louisiana. He worked as a planter, butcher and merchant and worked for the New Orleans Tribune. He was elected to serve in the Louisiana State Senate in 1868 as a Radical, and he served until his death in 1869.

He was murdered by two white men who remained unpunished for the crime. He was beaten for a long time with clubs in his own store in St. Marin and left to die. He was taken to New Orleans where he sued the sheriff of St. Martin and his brothers and a nephew for assault and battery. He died of lockjaw in immense pain on May 21, 1869.

He had a Catholic funeral service performed at the Augustine Church in New Orleans by Father Joubert and was buried in the St. Louis cemetery. He funeral was attended by Governor Henry C. Warmoth as well as many other office holders including members of the senate and house.

He was one of two senators from the 1868-1870 legislative session to die in 1869, the other being John Randall.

François had a son Alexander R. François Jr. (born 1842/43) who was a justice of the peace in Saint Martin Parish until he fled following his father's murder.

== See also ==
- African American officeholders from the end of the Civil War until before 1900
