= John Randall (politician) =

Louisiana reconstruction era American politician

Louisiana State Senate
- In office 1868–1869

Personal details
- Born: Virginia
- Died: May 8, 1869
- Party: Republican

John Randall (died May 8, 1869) was a state legislator who served in the Louisiana State Senate during the Reconstruction era.

== Biography ==
Randall was a member of the 1868 Republican State Convention and was made a member of the State Central Committee representing Concordia Parish along with John S. Harris.

He was unanimously nominated to stand to fill the senate seat left by John S. Harris who had resigned to move on to serve as a United States Senator for Louisiana.

Randall, a Republican, was elected to serve in the Louisiana State Senate and was sworn in on September 15, 1868. Later the same week senator Blackman, a Democrat, called for John Randall to be removed and that the election be declared unconstitutional, null and void.

He represented the district for the Concordia Parish and Avoyelles Parish. He served on the Committee on Enrolment and on the Committee on Unfinished Business.

He died at his home May 8, 1869 of a "congestive chill" and is buried at his home in Vidalia, Louisiana. His death was noted on the second day of the 1870 session along with fellow senator Alexander R. François who had also died the same year.

His obituary noted that he had been born enslaved and was an honest man who endeavoured to promote harmony between blacks and whites.

== See also ==
- African American officeholders from the end of the Civil War until before 1900
