= William C. Randall =

American politician and judge

William C. Randall (born October 14, 1943) is a former politician and judge in the U.S. state of Georgia. He was a state legislator for 24 years.

He was born in Macon, Georgia and attended Peter G. Appling High School, Morgan State University, and Emory University School of Law. He was elected to represent Bibb County, Georgia in the Georgia House of Representatives in 1974 and held office until 1999. He chaired the Special Judiciary Committee.

In 1999, Georgia governor Roy Barnes appointed him as a judge. After 19 years as Chief Judge of Civil and Magistrate Court in Bibb County, he announced his retirement in 2018.

He and his father, William P. Randall, were interviewed in 1989. Lillian Randall was his mother. He has a wife, Lauretta, five children, and 11 grandchildren. Nikki Randall, member of Georgia House of Representatives, is his daughter.

== See also ==
- Georgia Legislative Black Caucus
