= John Randall (Puritan) =

English puritan divine

John Randall (1570–1622), was an English puritan divine.

== Early life ==
Randall was born in 1570 at Great Missenden, Buckinghamshire, England. At age 11, Randal was sent to St. Mary Hall (now part of Oriel College) in Oxford, where he matriculated on 27 Nov. 1581.

== Education ==
Randall then attended Trinity College, Oxford, and graduated with a BA degree on 9 February 1585. Randall was elected a fellow of Lincoln College at Oxford on 6 July 1587, and received his MA degree on 9 July 1589. Among his pupils at Lincoln was the puritan preacher Robert Bolton.

When Queen Elizabeth I's visited Oxford University in August 1592, Randall ran the academical performance given in her honour. Afterwards, Randall studied divinity and was admitted B.D. on 28 June 1598.

== Career ==
On 31 Jan. 1599, Randall was appointed rector of St. Andrew Hubbard church in Little Eastcheap, London. While at St. Andrew Hubbard, Randall gained a reputation as a staunch Puritan and an effective preacher.

In May 1622, Randall died at his house in the Minories parish in London. He was buried in St. Andrew Hubbard. In 1666, the church was destroyed in the Great Fire of London and was never rebuilt.

In his will, Randall gave part of his property to the poor of Great Missenden parish, All Hallows parish in Oxford, and St. Andrew's parish; a tenement called Ship Hall; and to Lincoln College. The rest of his estate went to relatives. Randall's wife and daughter predeceased him. His portrait, painted when he was fellow of Lincoln College, hangs in the common room there.

In addition to separate sermons, published posthumously by his friend William Holbrook, Randall left for publication Three-and-Twenty Sermons or Catechisticall Lectures upon the Sacrament of the Lord's Supper, preached Monthly before the Communion, London, 1630, 4to; published by his executor, Joshua Randall.
