= Jack Randall =

Jack Randall may refer to:

- Jack Randall (boxer) (1794-1828), British boxer
- Jack Randall (actor) (Addison Randall, 1906-1945), American actor
- Jack Randall (footballer) (born 1992), English footballer
- Jack Randall (ichthyologist) (1924-2020)
- Jack Randall, main character in Spares by Michael Marshall Smith
- Jack Randall (character), from Diana Gabaldon's Outlander series

== See also ==
- John Randall (disambiguation)
