= George Randall (actor) =

Australian actor

George Randall (1895–1955) was an Australian actor with extensive experience on stage and radio.
