= Thomas Randall =

Thomas or Tom Randall may refer to:

- Thomas Randolph (ambassador) (1525/6–1590), a.k.a. Thomas Randall
- Thomas Randolph (poet) (1605–1635), English poet and dramatist, aka Thomas Randall
- Thomas Randall (MP for Truro)
- Thomas Randall, headmaster of Durham School
- T. Henry Randall, American architect
- Tom Randall (American football) (born 1956), American football player
- Tom Randall (politician) (born 1981), British MP for Gedling
- Tom Randall (climber), British rock climber
