= Harry Randall =

Harry Randall may refer to:

- Harry Randall (British politician) (1899–1976), British Labour Party politician
- Harry Randall (actor) (1857–1932), English comic actor
- Harry Wayland Randall (1915–2012), photographer with the International Brigade
- Harry Randall Jr. (1927–2013), American Republican Party politician from New Jersey
- Harry Randall (rugby union) (born 1997), English rugby union player

== See also ==
- Henry Randall (disambiguation)
