= Bob Randall (rugby union) =

- Full name: Robert John Randall
- Born: 3 December 1890 Neath, Wales
- Died: 7 July 1965 (aged 74) Port Talbot, Wales
- Height: 5 ft 10 in (178 cm)
- Weight: 13.10 st (183 lb; 83 kg)

Rugby union career
- Position: Lock
International career
Years	Team	Apps	(Points)
1924	Wales	2	(0)

Robert John Randall (3 December 1890 – 7 July 1965) was a Welsh international rugby union player.

A forward, Randall had a long career with Aberavon RFC both sides of World War I, after making his debut in 1911. He didn't get his Wales opportunity until late in his career, making two appearances as a 33 year old in the 1924 Five Nations, by which time he had ascended to the Aberavon captaincy.

Randall's son Dai also competed for Aberavon.

== See also ==
- List of Wales national rugby union players
