= Benjamin H. Randall =

American politician

Benjamin Hoyt Randall (November 25, 1823 – October 1, 1913) was an American politician and Businessman.

Born in Greensboro, Vermont, Randall moved to Chicago, Illinois and then to Springfield, Illinois where he worked as a hotel clerk and then owned a barge boat. He then taught school in Missouri. In 1849, Randall moved to Minnesota Territory and settled in Fort Snelling where he was a sutler/clerk. While at Fort Snelling, Randall served in the Minnesota Territorial House of Representatives 1851 and 1852 to 1853. In 1862, Randall moved to Fort Ridgely and served as a sutler until 1867 when the fort was abandoned. Randall then moved to St. Peter, Minnesota where he owned a boot and shoe manufacturing company. He served as mayor of St. Peter, Minnesota and then served in the Minnesota House of Representatives from 1883 to 1884. In 1888, Randall moved to Winona, Minnesota where he died in 1913.
