= Benjamin Randall (Wisconsin politician) =

American politician

Benjamin Randall was a member of the Wisconsin State Assembly.

== Biography ==
Randall was born on April 28, 1793, in Hopkinton, Rhode Island. In 1845, he settled with his family in what would become Lebanon, Dodge County, Wisconsin. Randall died on April 24, 1863. His son, Barber Randall, became a Republican politician.

== Career ==
Randall was a member of the Assembly during the 1st Wisconsin Legislature. He was a Democrat.
