= Nikki Randall (politician) =

American politician

Member of the Georgia House of Representatives
- In office 1999–2017
- Succeeded by: Miriam Paris
- Constituency: 138th District (1999-2012); 142nd District (2012-2017)

Personal details
- Born: June 3, 1972 (age 54) Macon, Georgia
- Party: Democratic
- Spouse: Isaiah
- Education: Tennessee State University
- Occupation: Marketing, public relations

Nikki T. Randall (born June 3, 1972) is an American politician who was Democratic member of the Georgia House of Representatives, for the 138th district since a special election on November 2, 1999. She was Minority Caucus Vice Chairman.

She is the daughter of retired judge and former state legislator William C. Randall.
