= Robert Richard Randall =

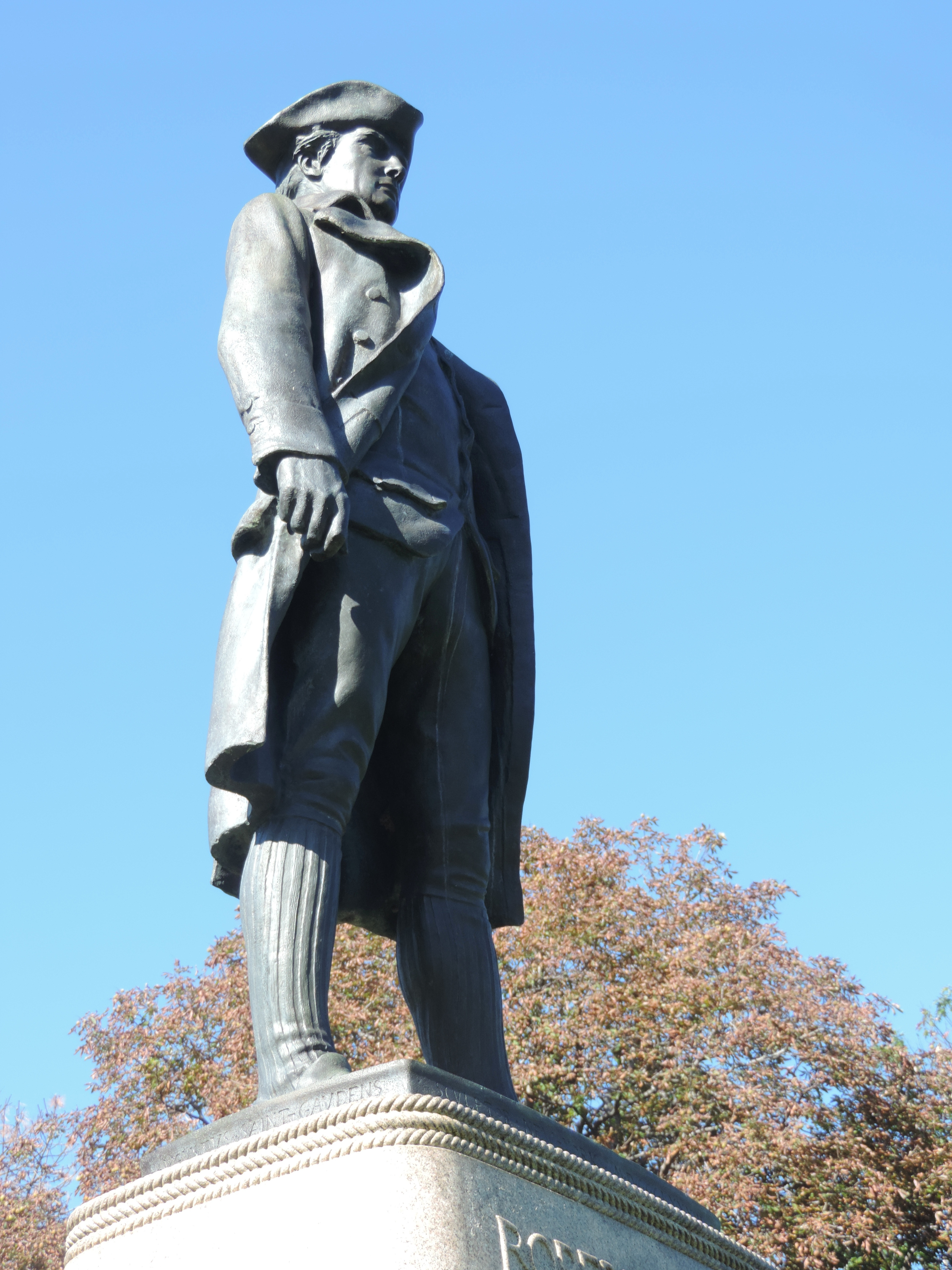
Randall statue, relocated in 2024 to SUNY Maritime College, Bronx, NY

Robert Richard Randall was a sea captain in life, and, after his death in New York City on June 5, 1801, an important philanthropist, caring for thousands of retired seafarers.

== Life ==
Captain Robert Richard Randall was born in New Jersey in 1750.

Randall's father, Captain Tom Randall, emigrated from Scotland in the 1740s, and was a privateer who amassed an extremely large estate. He was a member of the Committee of 51 which enforced the boycott of British goods up to the American Revolution. He was also a shareholder in the Tontine Coffee House, was one of the original 12 members of the New York Chamber of Commerce, and served as Vice Counsel to China. Captain Randall served as coxswain for the boat that carried George Washington from Elizabethtown, New Jersey to Lower Manhattan for his first inauguration. After Captain Tom retired from sailing, he set up a merchant shop on Hanover Street, while his son took over his fleet. He died in 1797 and is buried in the graveyard at Trinity Church Cemetery.

Randall served as a privateer during the American Revolution.

In 1771 Randall, as a young man, joined the Marine Society of New York, a relief society for vessel operators, and their widow and orphans. His work with this charitable organization served to inspire him to dedicate his wealth to supporting needy sailors.

After his father's death, five years before Captain Robert himself died at the age of 51, Robert Randall used some of the money from his inheritance to purchase the former Elliot estate in the then-rural Greenwich Village for a sum of 5,000 pounds. The new Randall estate was 24 acres, and covered the area between today's Fourth and Fifth Streets and Waverly Place and Ninth Street.

== Philanthropy ==
As a sailor, himself, Captain Randall understood the difficulty of life as a sailor. Upon his death in 1801, Randall's will, drawn by Alexander Hamilton, directed an array of political, religious, and civic leaders in the city with the task of erecting an "Asylum or Marine Hospital, to be called the Sailors' Snug Harbor for the purpose of maintaining and supporting aged, decrepit, and worn-out sailors." The endowment for the charity was to be formed from his estate in New York City.

As the area was still mostly rural at the time of his death, Randall wanted Sailor's Snug Harbor to be built on his property, which included the north side of Washington Square Park and the south side of Eighth Street. The land was good farm land, and Randall believed that the residents would be able to grow grain and vegetables to be used to support the sailors living at Snug Harbor.

However, there was a challenge to Randall's will by the children of his half-brother, which took many years in court to settle. By the time the conflict had been decided in favor of Sailor's Snug Harbor, the organization decided to subdivide up the land and lease it out. In 1831, Sailor's Snug Harbor used the money from the Greenwich Village leases to purchase a 160-acre complex on Staten Island for $16,000, to use as the home for the sailors.

According to Randall's will, this “snug harbor” was to be a marine hospital for “the purpose of maintaining aged, decrepit, and worn-out sailors.” The lawyer responsible for drawing up the will was Alexander Hamilton. The charity set up by Randall and Hamilton was one of the first charitable institutions in the United States. The sole requirement for residency at Sailor's Snug Harbor was five years sailing under a United States Flagged Shipped (Military or civilian). There were no age, religion, race, or other factors taken into consideration. Once in residence, each former sailor was called “Captain” by the staff, regardless of their actual rank during their service. Though modified much since its inception, the Sailors of Snug Harbor foundation continues to function to this day.

== Death and Burial ==
Randall died on June 5, 1801. He was initially buried in a plot in the cemetery at St. Mark's Church, but was subsequently moved into a vault as the extension of 8th Street per the Commissioners' Plan of 1811 would have run through his grave. Once Sailors' Snug Harbor was completed, his remains were transported to Staten Island and laid to rest on August 21, 1834, under a monument bearing his name.
