= Hagner =

Hagner is a surname. Notable people with the surname include:

- Alexander Burton Hagner (1826–1915), United States federal judge
- Belle Hagner (1875–1943), first United States social secretary
- Donald Hagner (born 1936), American theologian
- Matthias Hagner (born 1974), German footballer
- Meredith Hagner (born 1987), American actress
- Peter Hagner (1772–1850), American clerk
- Peter V. Hagner (1815–1893), United States Army officer
- Viviane Hagner, German violinist

== See also ==
- Adele Hagner Stamp (1893–1974), first dean of women at the University of Maryland College Park
