= William Winston Seaton =

American journalist and politician (1785–1866)

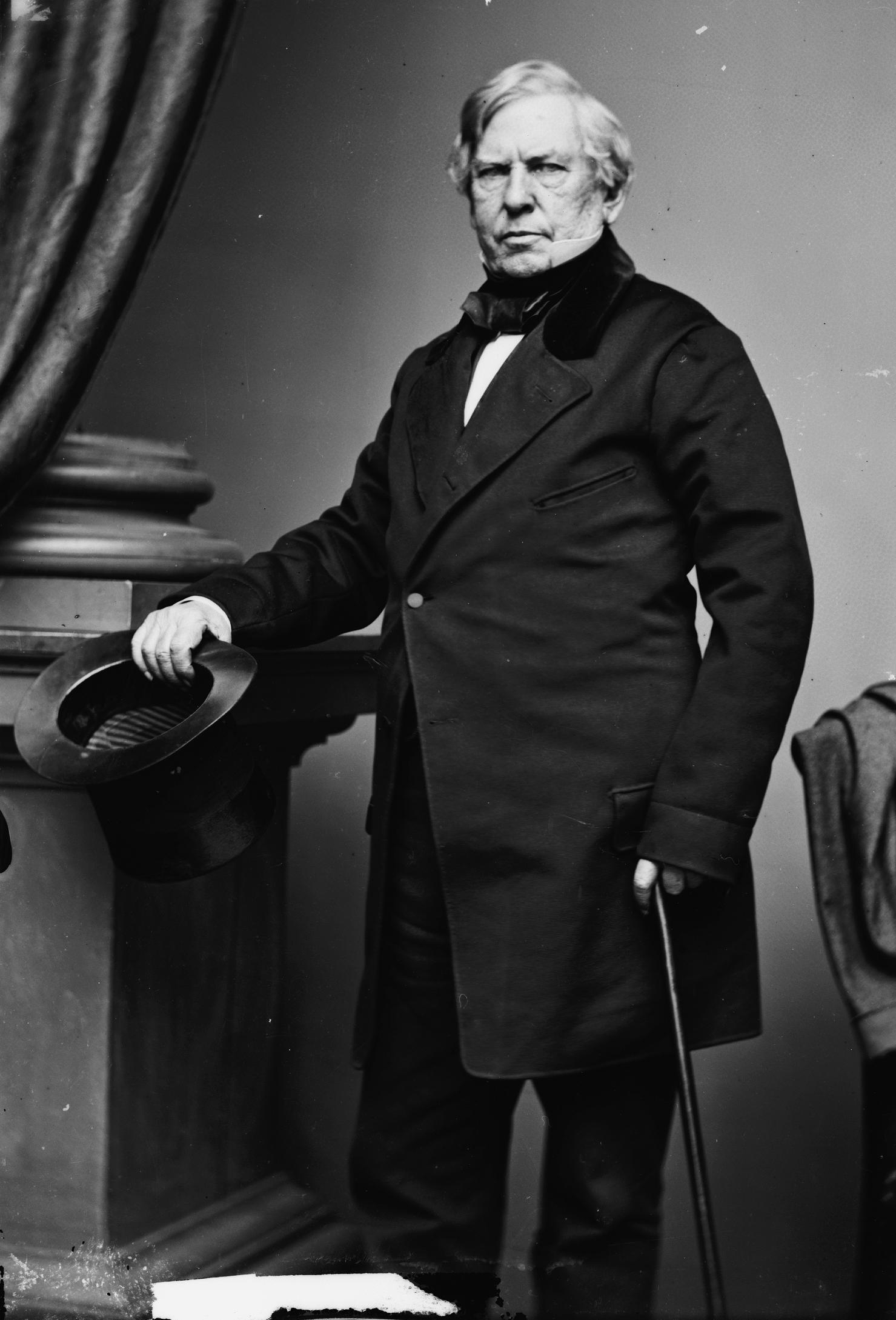
- Born: January 11, 1785; King William County, Virginia
- Died: June 16, 1866 (aged 81); Washington DC
- Resting place: Holmead's Burying Ground Later disinterred and moved to Congressional Cemetery
- Occupations: Printer/Publisher/Reporter National Intelligencer, Mayor of Washington D.C.
- Known for: Mayor of Washington D.C., Founded St. John's Episcopal Church, Lafayette Square
- Spouse: Sarah Weston Gales (m. 1809)
- Children: 11
- Relatives: Joseph Gales (brother-in-law); Joseph Gales Sr. (father-in-law); Winifred Gales (mother-in-law)

13th Mayor of the City of Washington, D.C.
- In office June 8, 1840 – June 10, 1850
- Preceded by: Peter Force
- Succeeded by: Walter Lenox

Personal details
- Party: Whig

William Winston Seaton (January 11, 1785 – June 16, 1866) was an American journalist and the thirteenth mayor of Washington, D.C.

== Life ==
William Winston Seaton was born in King William County, Virginia. His mother's maiden name was Winston and was a cousin of Patrick Henry. He studied under Reverend James Ogilvie at an academy in Richmond. At the age of 18, he became an assistant editor for a paper in Richmond. He was an editor for the Petersburg Republican and then purchased the North Carolina Journal based in Halifax. After Raleigh became the state capital, he became connected with the Raleigh Register and its editor Joseph Gales Sr.

In 1812, he moved to Washington, D.C., and joined with his brother-in-law Joseph Gales, proprietor of the National Intelligencer at Washington, D.C.. From 1812 until 1820 the two were the only reporters of congressional proceedings. Their Annals of Congress, Debates and Proceedings in the Congress of the United States from 3 March 1798, till 27 May 1824 (42 volumes, 1834–1856), and their Register of Debates in Congress from 1824 till 1837 (29 volumes, 1827–37) are sources of the utmost importance on the history of the times. After the death of Gales in 1860, he was sole manager and editor of the National Intelligencer.

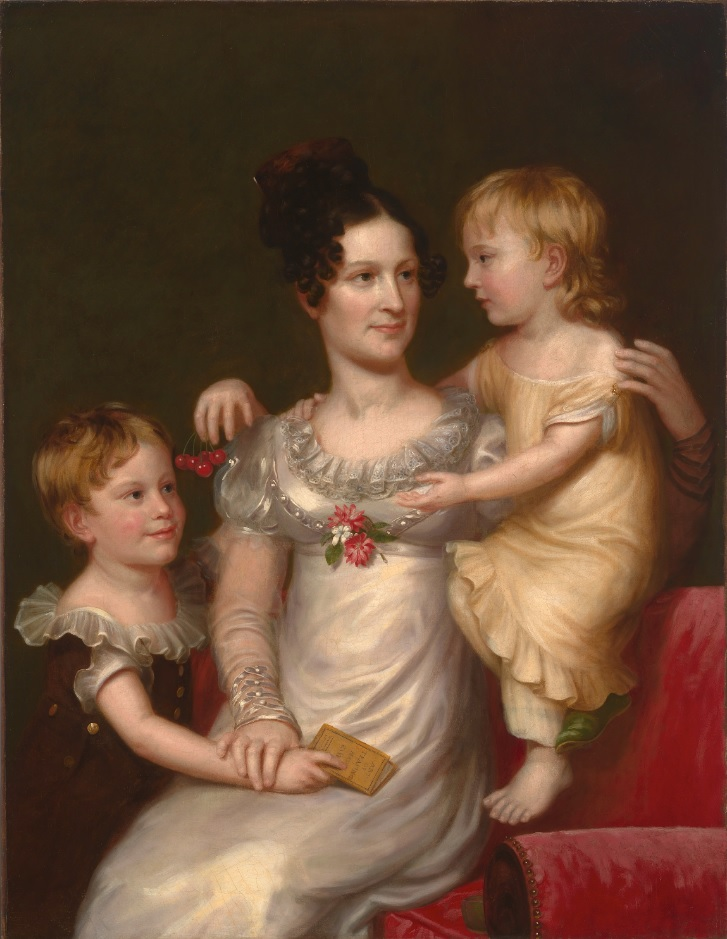
Sarah Weston Seaton with her children Augustine and Julia, painted by Charles Bird King around 1815

In 1809, he married Sarah Weston Gales (1790–1863), the daughter of newspaper publisher Joseph Gales Sr. and novelist Winifred Gales. Sarah spoke French and Spanish, and did occasional work for the National Intelligencer as a translator; they had 11 children.

== Mayor of Washington D.C. ==
Seaton served on the Washington Board of Aldermen from 1819 to 1831, and was elected Mayor of Washington in 1840. However, Seaton was a Whig — the political party formed in opposition to the policies of the Democrats who then controlled both the Congress and the presidency. Federal officials were so distraught at Seaton's election that the Senate introduced legislation that would abolish the city's charter; thanks to petitions from District citizens and sympathetic Senators, the bill was tabled after three readings.

During his 10 years as mayor, Seaton was instrumental in the development of the city's public education system and in numerous civic improvements, including telegraph and gas lines as well as the construction of the first waterworks.

== Founding of St. John's Episcopal Church, Lafayette Square ==
To supply this great need the residents in what was known as the First and Second Wards of Washington-lying between Georgetown and Sixth Street-in the year 1814 took decided measures to procure the erection of a church in the part of the city referred to. The persons who seem to have been most actively engaged in this work were Thomas H Gillis, James Davidson, Lund Washington, Peter Hagner, John Graham (diplomat), John Peter Van Ness, Joshua Dawson, William Winston Seaton, John Tayloe III, Thomas Munroe, James Thompson, James H. Blake, David Easton and Joseph Gales, Jr.

== Societies ==
During the 1820s, Seaton was a member of the prestigious society, Columbian Institute for the Promotion of Arts and Sciences, who counted among their members former presidents Andrew Jackson and John Quincy Adams and many prominent men of the day, including well-known representatives of the military, government service, medical and other professions.

== Later life ==
Seaton died in 1866 of skin cancer and was interred at Holmead's Burying Ground in Washington, D.C. He was later disinterred, and moved to an unmarked grave at Congressional Cemetery.

== Sources ==
- William Winston Seaton of the 'National Intelligencer' By Josephine Seaton
- Chest of Books
- Ridgely, Helen West (1908). Historic Graves of Maryland and the District of Columbia, With the Iappearing on the Tombstones in Most of the Counties of the State and in Washington and Georgetown. New York: Grafton Press.

Political offices
Preceded by Peter Force	Mayor of Washington, D.C. 1840–1850	Succeeded by Walter Lenox
