= St. John's Episcopal Church (Lafayette Square) =

Historic church in Washington, D.C., United States

- U.S. National Register of Historic Places
- U.S. National Historic Landmark
- U.S. National Historic Landmark District – Contributing property
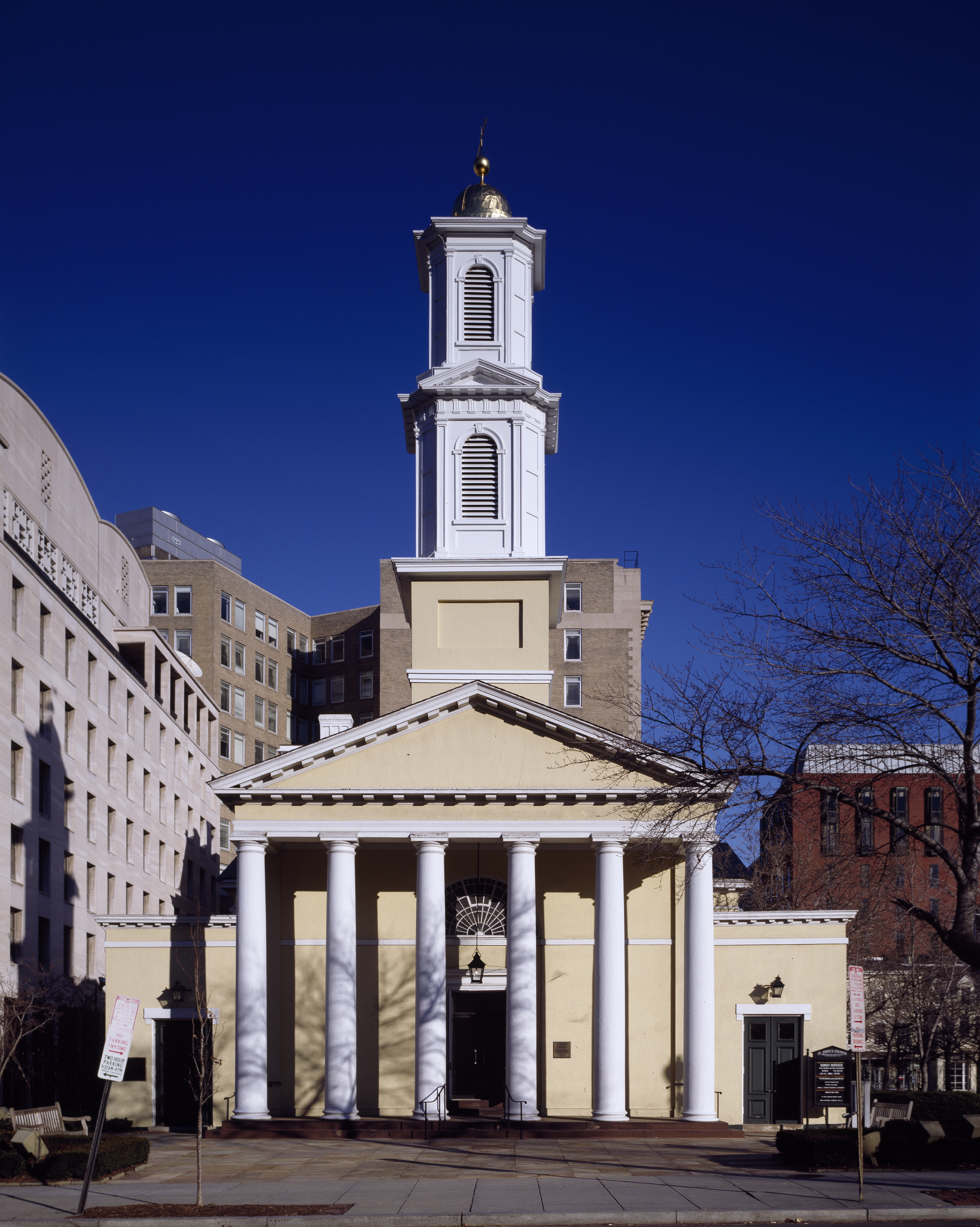

- Location within Central Washington, D.C. Location within the District of Columbia Location within the United States
- Location: 1525 H Street, N.W., Washington, D.C., U.S.
- Coordinates: 38°54′1.41″N 77°2′9.91″W
- Built: 1816; 210 years ago
- Part of: Lafayette Square Historic District (ID70000833)
- NRHP reference No.: 66000868

Significant dates
- Added to NRHP: October 15, 1966
- Designated NHL: December 19, 1960
- Designated NHLDCP: August 29, 1970

St. John's Episcopal Church is a historic Episcopal church located at Sixteenth Street and H Street NW, in Washington, D.C., United States. The Greek Revival building, designed by Benjamin Henry Latrobe, is adjacent to Lafayette Square, one block from the White House. It is often called the "Church of the Presidents". The church reported 2,445 members in 2019 and 1,527 members in 2023. Plate and pledge income reported for the congregation in 2024 was $1,481,895. Average Sunday attendance (ASA) in 2024 was 351 persons.

Every sitting president has attended the church at least once since it was built in 1816, starting with James Madison. Many of the traditional Inauguration Day spiritual services have been held at St. John's. It was designated a National Historic Landmark in 1960.

== History ==
Organized as a parish in 1815, it was named for Saint John the Evangelist. On October 27, 1816, the building opened and the first service was held. The Rev. William Dickinson Hawley served as its rector from 1817 to 1845, also serving as Chaplain of the Senate.

=== Inception and construction ===
Two years after Maryland had ceded to the United States the territory constituting the present District of Columbia, the legislature of that state, appreciating the necessity of providing for the spiritual needs of the Protestant Episcopal inhabitants who were to reside there, and on their petition, passed the act of 26 December 1794, creating a new parish, to be known as Washington Parish-to be composed of so much of the Rock Creek Parish, in Montgomery County, Maryland, as St. John's Parish, in Prince George's County, Maryland, as was within the boundaries of the new city of Washington. In the next year a vestry was elected by the Episcopalians of the eastern end of the new parish, and the Rev. Mr. Ralph was appointed rector of the charge then organized, and took his seat in the Maryland Convention of 1795. This congregation occupied a small building on D Street and New Jersey Avenue, in the southeastern part of Washington, which since 1780, had been used as a chapel of ease connected with St. John Parish in Prince George's County. In 1806 a vestry was elected from the people worshipping at this chapel, and, in 1807, a new church was established in that vicinity, which was named Christ Church.

In Georgetown, in 1796, the Protestant Episcopal inhabitants had inaugurated a movement resulting in the establishment of a church within the new parish (St. John's Episcopal Church, Georgetown) which was consecrated in 1809. When the general government was removed from Philadelphia, in 1800, the newcomers found three places of worship for Episcopalians within the district, two previously mentioned and the third being St. Paul's Church in Rock Creek Parish; but all too far removed from the central and more populated portion of Washington to be practically useful in those days of almost impassable roads. To supply this great need the residents in what was known as the First and Second Wards of Washington-lying between Georgetown and Sixth Street-in the year 1814 took decided measures to procure the erection of a church in the part of the city referred to. The persons who seem to have been most actively engaged in this work were Thomas H Gillis, James Davidson, Lund Washington, Peter Hagner, John Graham, John Peter Van Ness, Joshua Dawson, William Winston Seaton, John Tayloe III, Thomas Munroe, James Thompson, James H. Blake, David Easton, and Joseph Gales Jr.

The first entry in the earliest record book of the church, under date May 10, 1816, is in these words:

"May 10, 1816. At a meeting of citizens, resident in the First and Second Wards of the City of Washington, it was resolved that the following named gentlemen be appointed Trustees to manage the secular affairs of St. Johns Church, until a Vestry can be legally appointed, and to apply to the next Convention of the Protestant Episcopal Church for a division of the Parish of Washington; so as to attach the Parish of St. John's Church, viz: John Davidson, Peter Hagner, James Thompson, John Peter Van Ness, John Tayloe III, Thomas H Gillis, James H. Blake, and Roger C. Weightman."

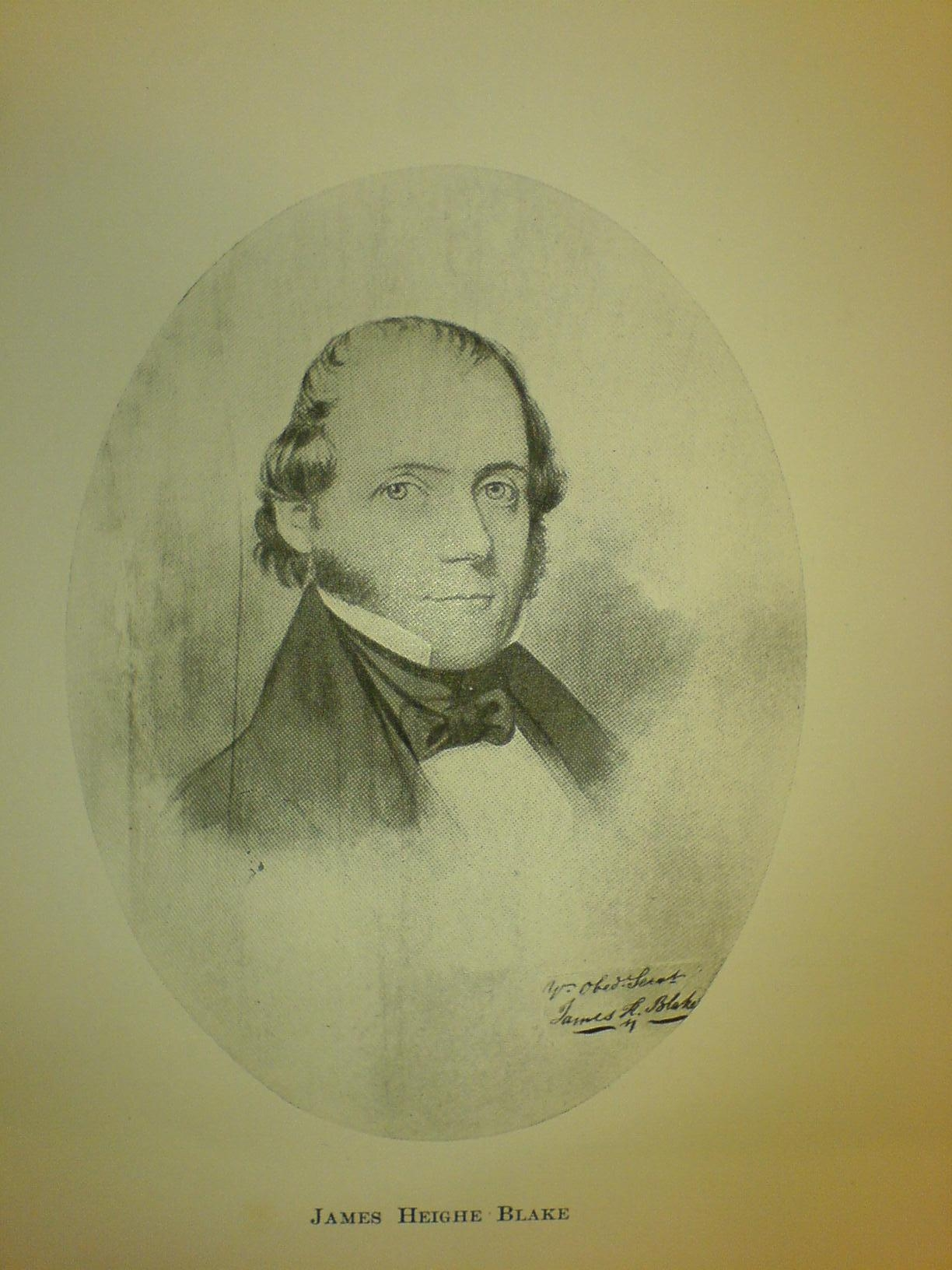
James Heighe Blake

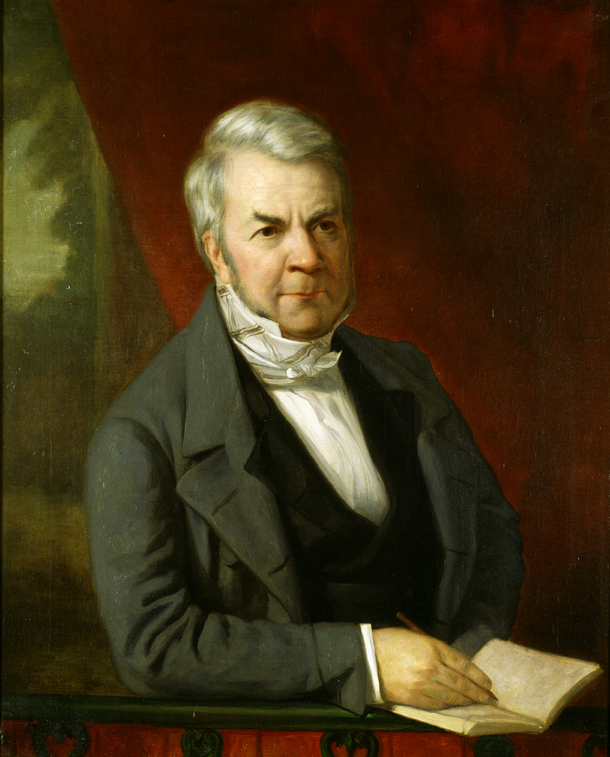
Joseph Gales Jr. ca. 1844 by George Peter Alexander Healy

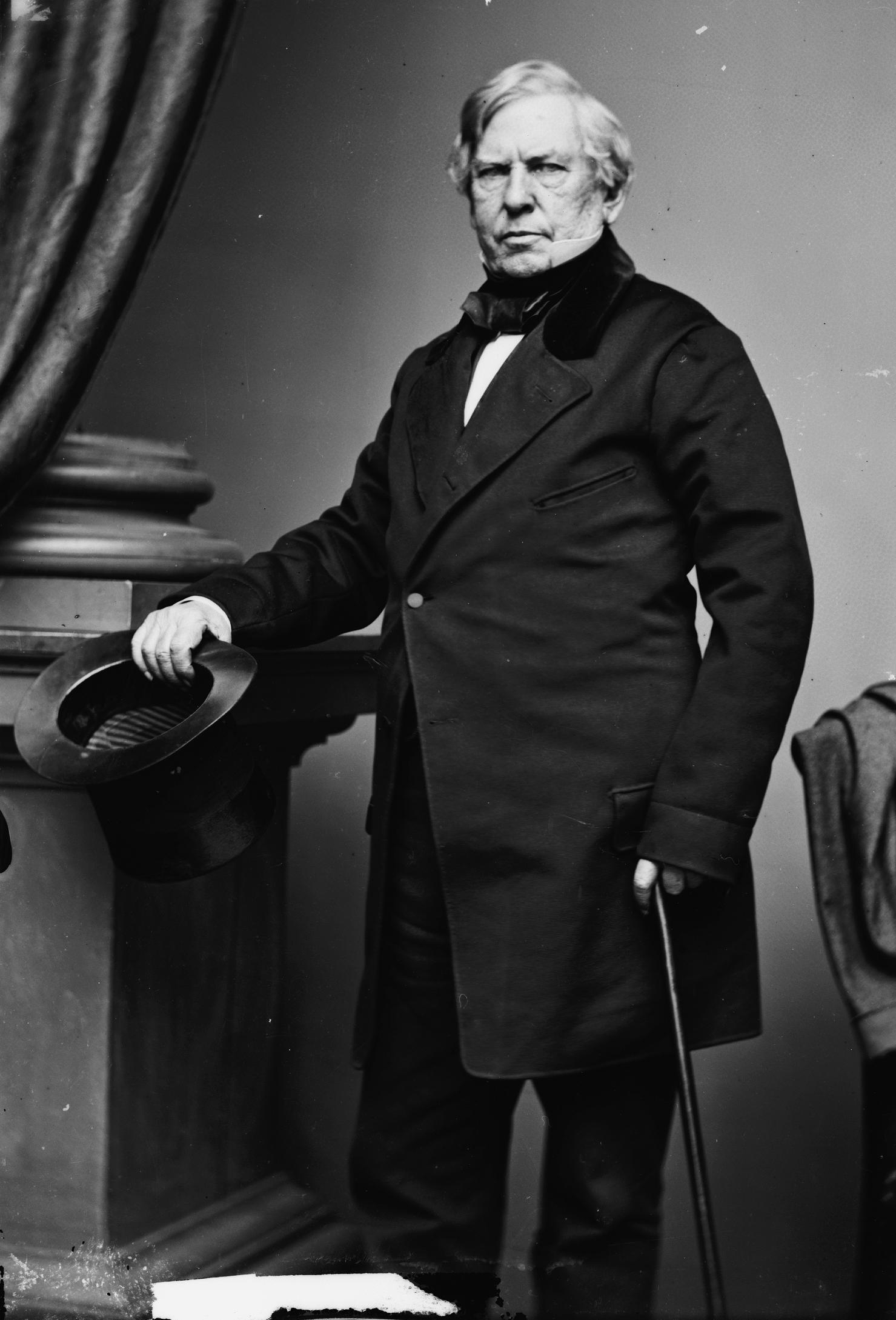
William Winston Seaton of the National Intelligencer

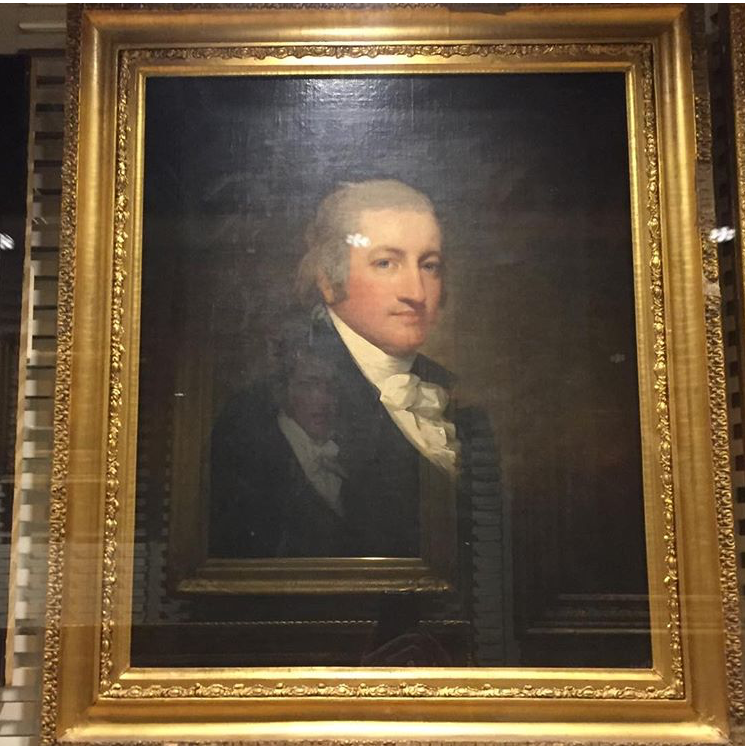
John Tayloe III by Gilbert Stuart on display at the Metropolitan Museum of Art

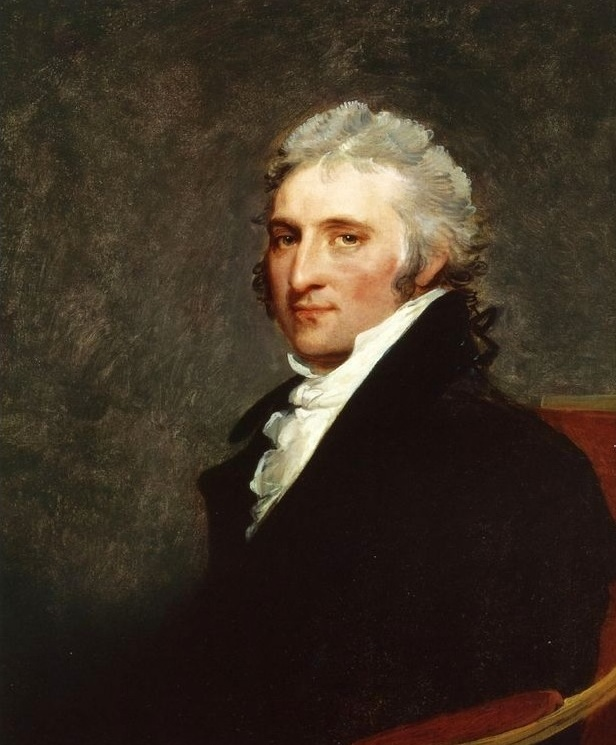
John Peter Van Ness 1805 portrait by Gilbert Stuart

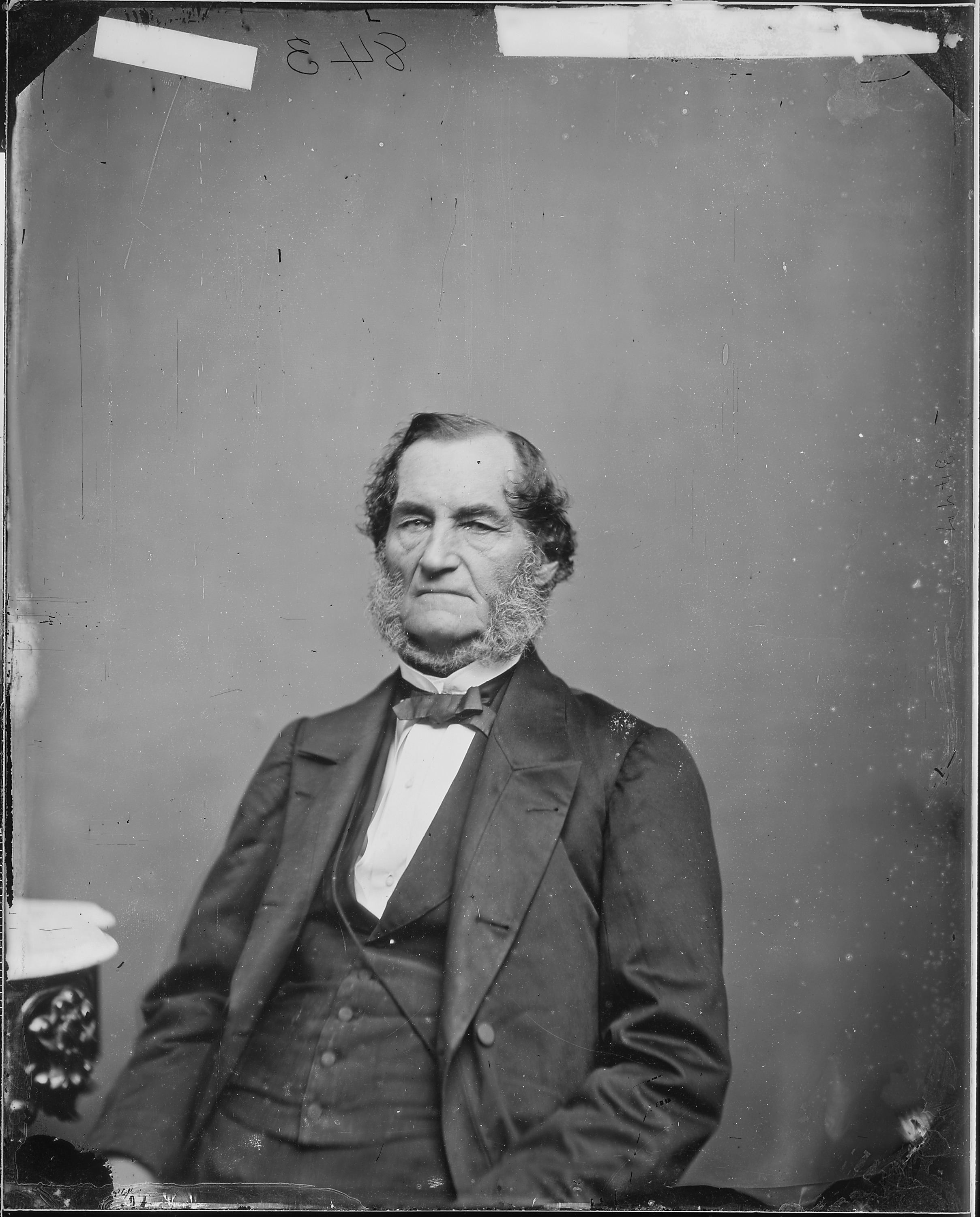
Roger Chew Weightman, Mayor of Washington, D.C.

On December 27, 1816, St. John's Day, Bishop James Kemp of Maryland performed the ceremonies of consecration, and religious services were conducted by the bishop and attendant clergy. The church building was designed by Benjamin Latrobe Esq, and constructed under his superintendence. He declined to receive any compensation for his valuable services, but the vestry voted him a pew free of rent, in acknowledgement of his generosity. This he declined, expressing his preference for some token that he might transmit to his children, and the testimonial took the form of a piece of plate. John Tayloe III donated to the parish a communion service of silver, which Bishop William Meade, in his work on the old Churches of Virginia, says had been purchased by Col. Tayloe at a sale of the effects of the Lunenburg Parish Church/Farnham Church in Richmond County, Virginia, to prevent its desecration for secular use.

=== Expansion ===
By 1842, it had become evident that further increases of the seating capacity of the church were expedient, and at a meeting of the pewholders called by public notice, on November 11, 1842, a committee, consisting of Richard Smith, John Canfield Spencer, Peter Hagner, Benjamin Ogle Tayloe, and William Thomas Carroll, was appointed to report a plan by which the number of pews should be increased, improved access given to galleries, and the interests of the existing pewholders properly adjusted. The committee reported on November 28, and in the following April, Col. John James Abert, Gen. Winfield Scott, Frank Markoe, and Charles Gordon, were appointed a committee to carry the plan into effect. In its execution the original arrangement of pews and aisles, which had hitherto remained substantially unchanged, was very greatly altered. The box and high-back pews were changed to low-back seats, the brick pavement disappeared with the old form of the aisles, the chancel was enlarged, and the wine-glass pulpit was removed.

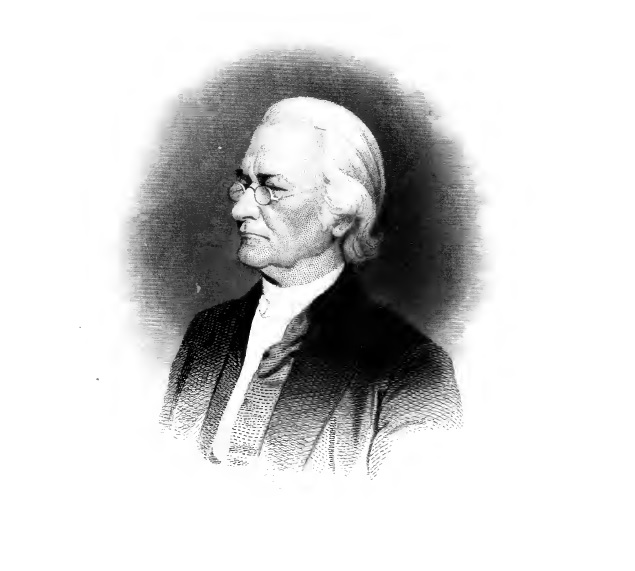
Bishop William Meade

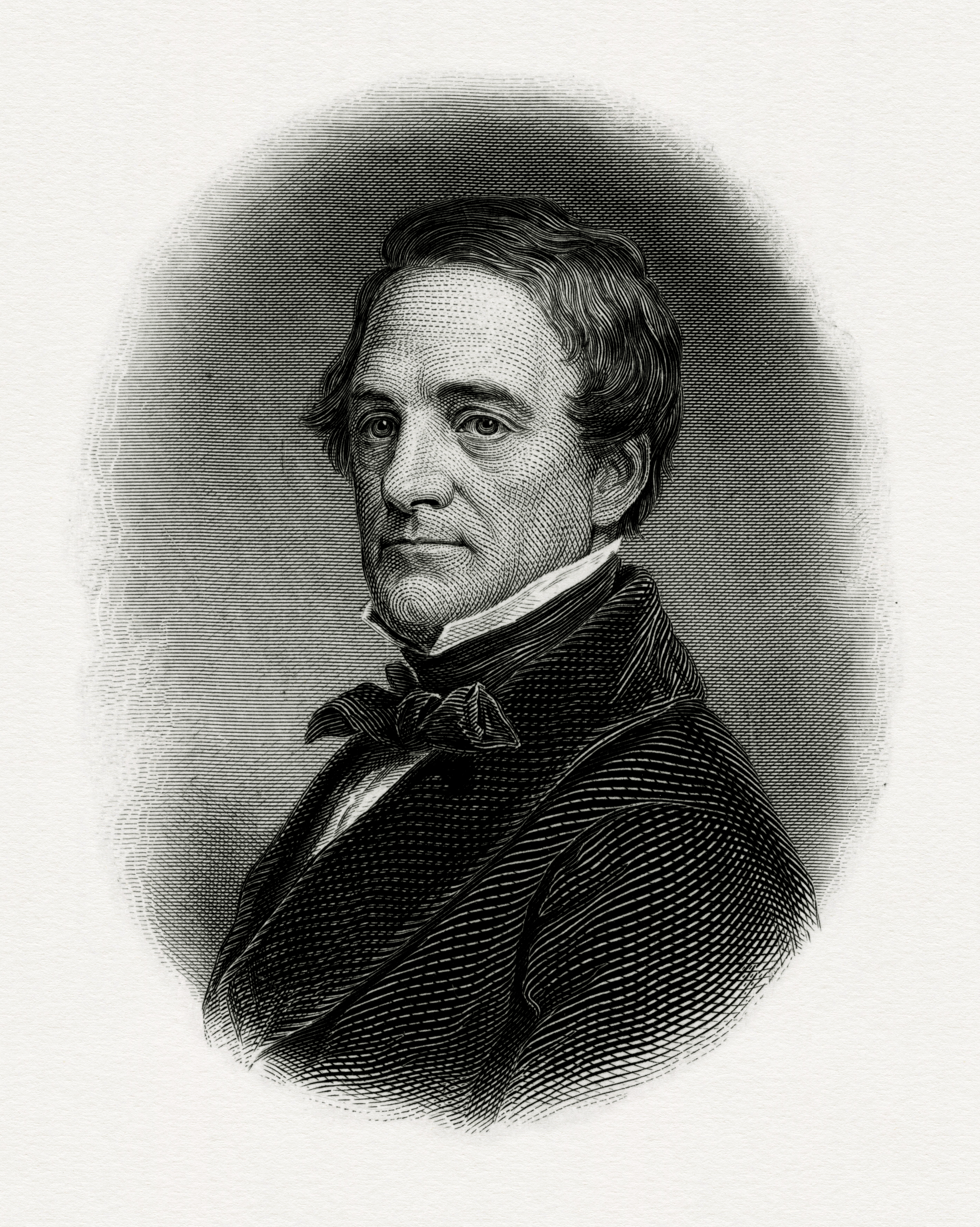
John Canfield Spencer

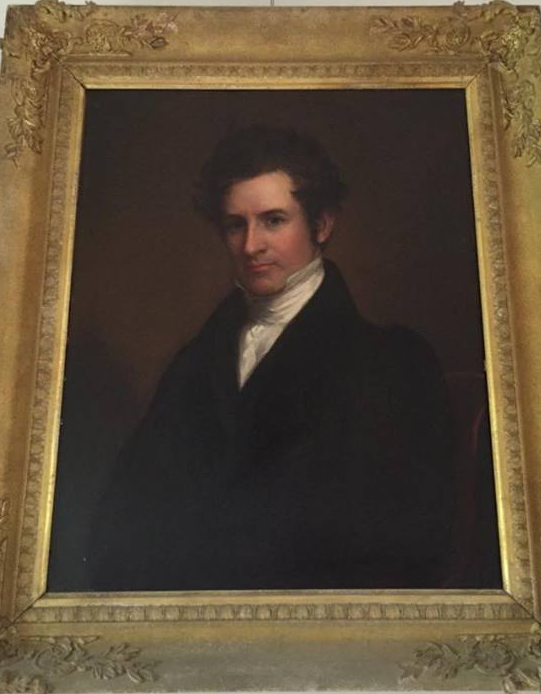
Benjamin Ogle Tayloe by Thomas Sully

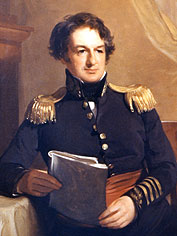
John James Abert

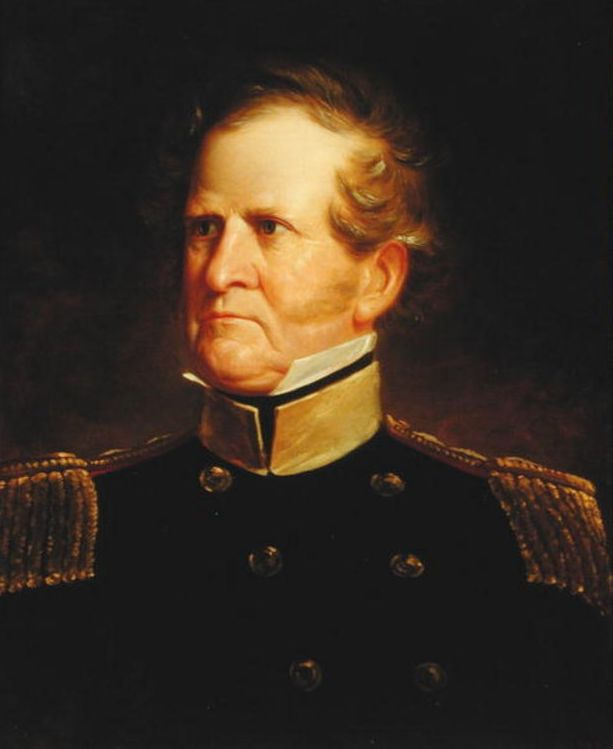
Winfield Scott, 1835 portrait by George Catlin

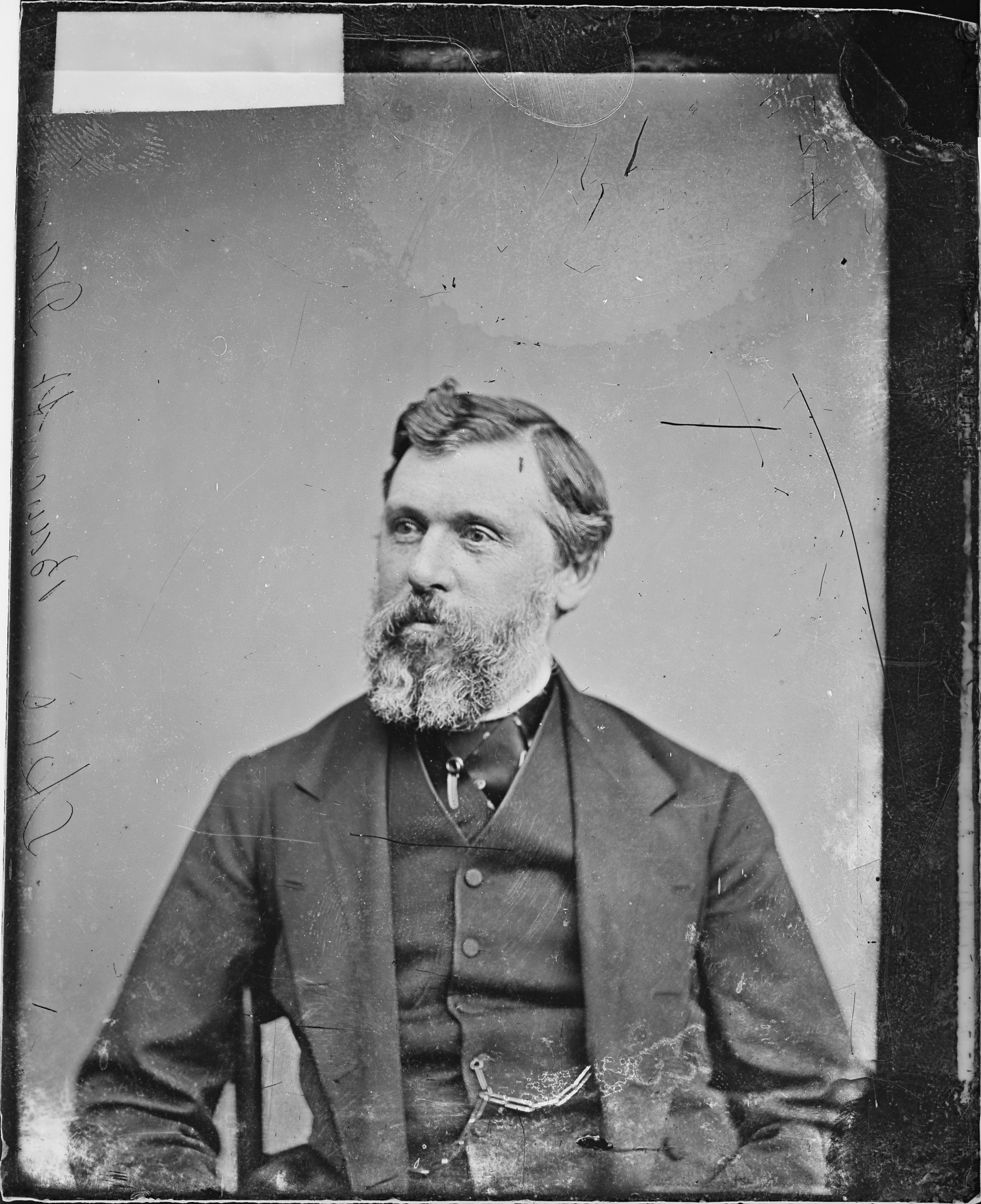
Bancroft Davis

Still more extensive changes were made in 1883 under the direction of Bancroft Davis and Gen. Peter V. Hagner, when almost all the windows were filled with stained glass, dedicated, for the most part, to deceased members of the congregation. The chancel was considerably enlarged, a new organ placed within the chancel rail, an addition made at the southeast corner of the church for a chantry, and a new vestry room, choir rooms, and offices erected. Altogether at least 180 sittings were added, making the entire sitting accommodation of the church at 780.

In 1902, the formal state funeral of British ambassador Lord Pauncefote took place in St. John's Church.

== "Church of the Presidents" ==
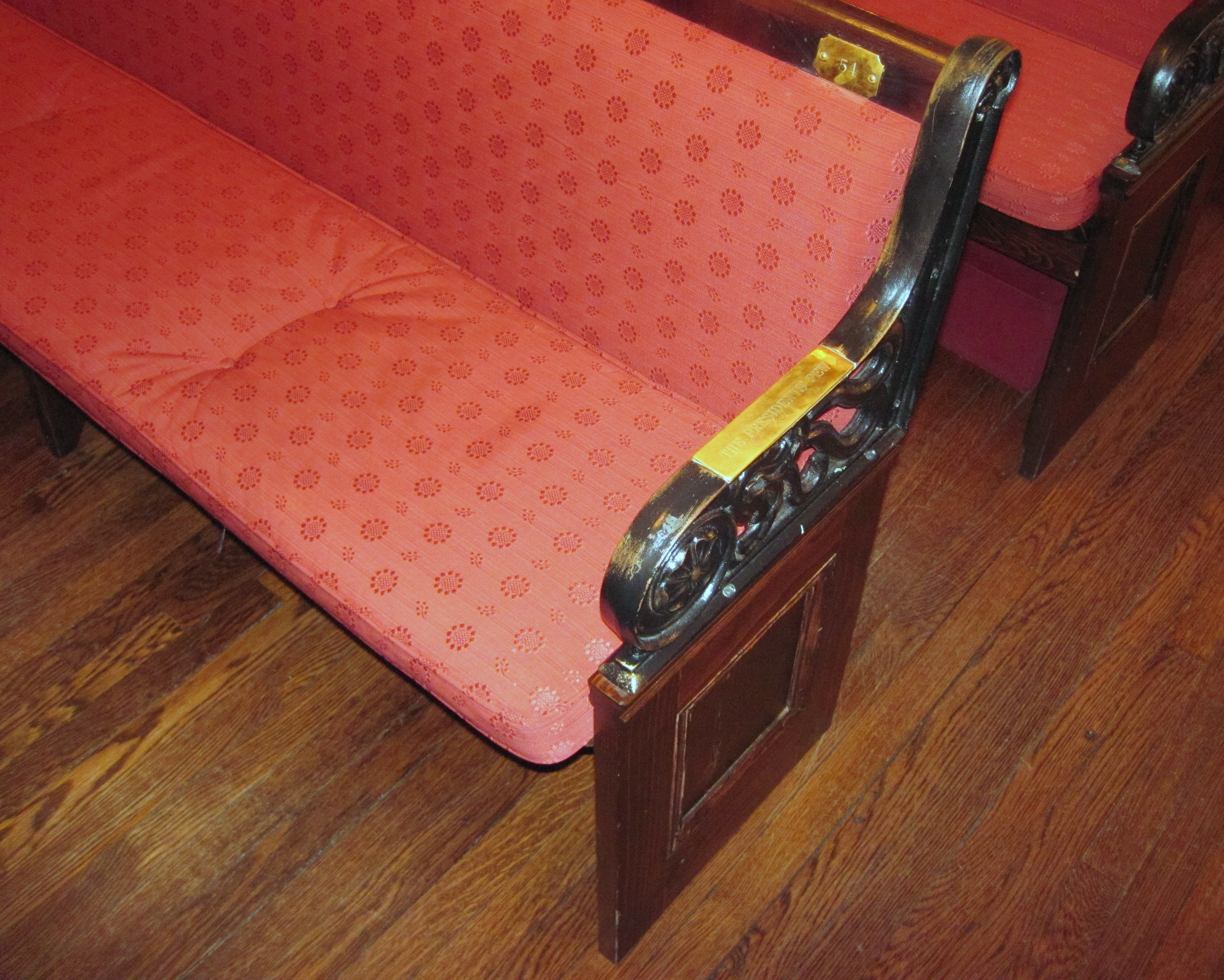
Presidents' pew

Beginning with James Madison, every president has been an occasional attendee at St. John's, due to both the disproportionately Anglican religious affiliation of U.S. presidents and the church's proximity to the White House. Perhaps the most devoted presidential attendee was Abraham Lincoln, who habitually joined evening prayer throughout the Civil War from an inconspicuous rear pew. St. John's is popularly nicknamed the "Church of the Presidents".

President James Madison established the tradition of a "president's pew", selecting pew 28 for his private use in 1816. The church was supported by pew subscriptions during its early history; although the vestry offered a pew to President Madison for free, he insisted on paying the rent. During a renovation in 1843, the pews were renumbered, and the president's pew became pew 58. President John Tyler asked that pew 58 be assigned to him, and paid for its use in perpetuity by presidents of the United States. Additional renovations in 1883 renumbered the seat to pew 54, and this pew has remained reserved for the president's use when in attendance. Although the "president's pew" is open for the use of any U.S. president who wishes to worship at the church, during weddings and other events the president usually sits in the front pew as a matter of protocol.

President Chester A. Arthur commissioned a memorial window for his wife, Ellen Lewis Herndon Arthur, who died in 1880, which was displayed in the church's south transept (visible from the White House) and lighted from within at his behest.

=== Role in the George Floyd protests ===
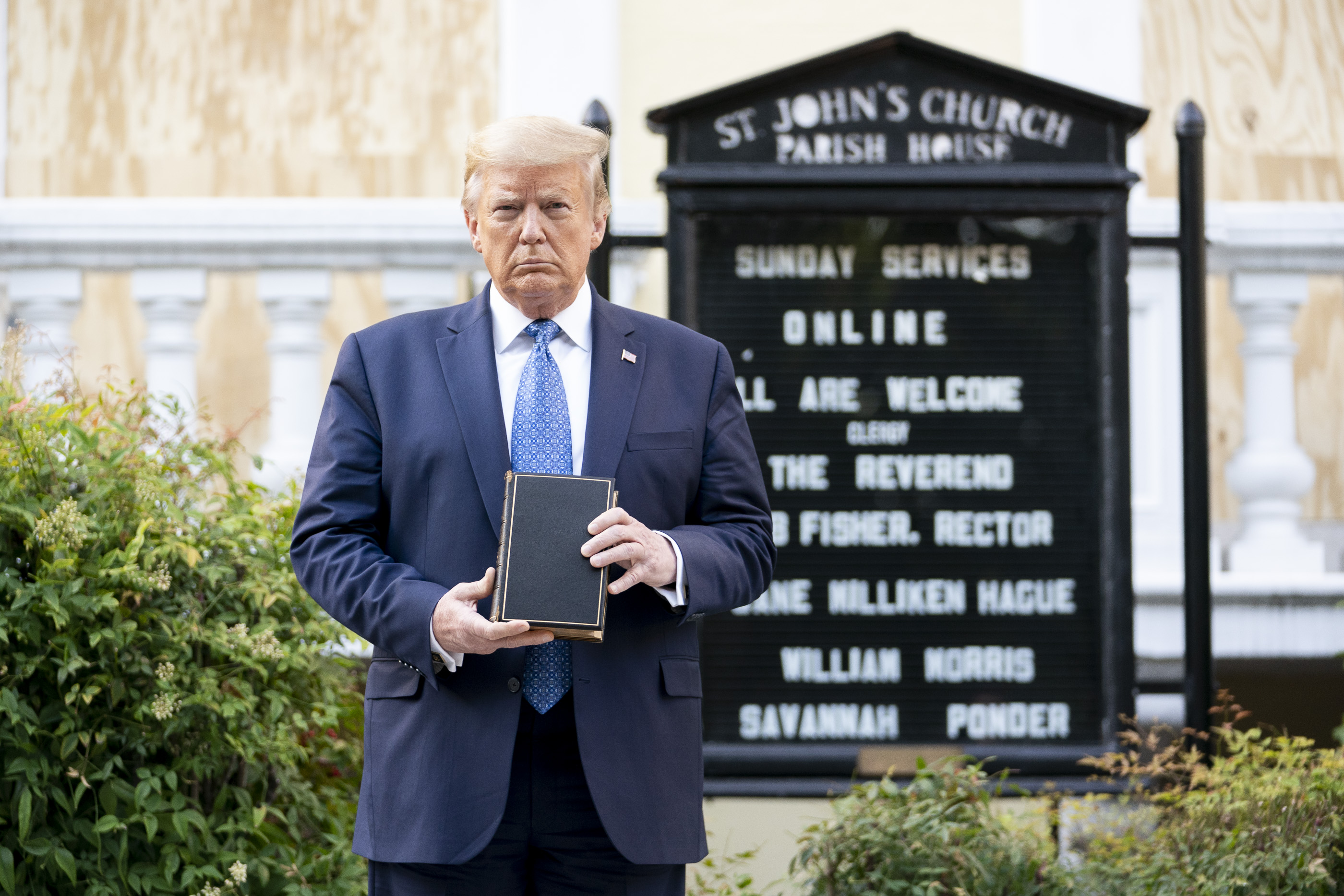
President Donald Trump in front of the boarded-up Ashburton House, June 1, 2020

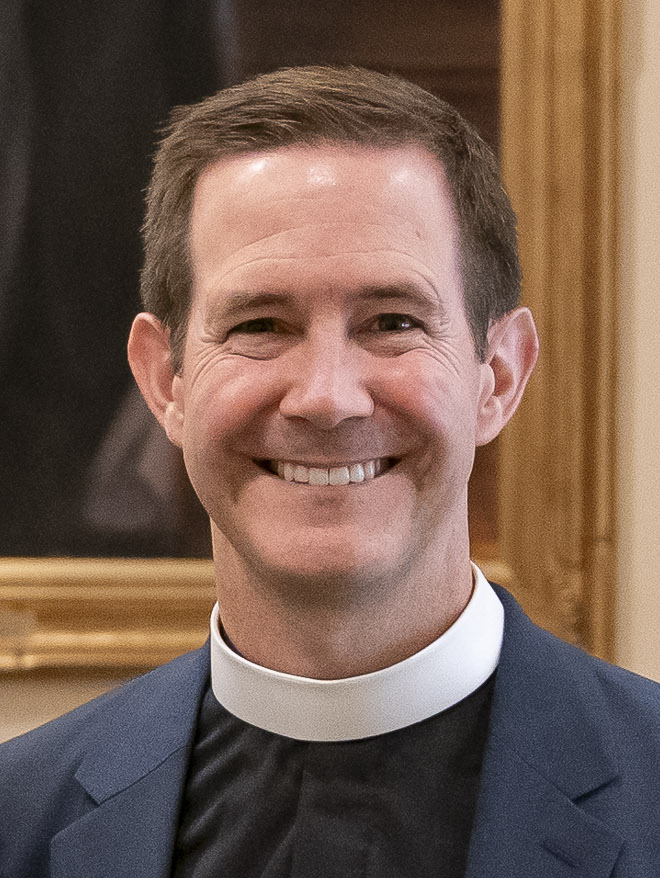
The Rev. Robert W. Fisher, the 15th Rector at St. John’s Episcopal Church in 2024

During the George Floyd protests on the night of May 31, 2020, several fires were set in Washington, D.C., including one set in the basement of Ashburton House, the parish house of St. John's Episcopal Church. The fire was isolated to the church nursery and extinguished by firefighters. According to the church's rector, the Rev. Rob Fisher, during the protests "a fire was lit in the nursery, in the basement of Ashburton House" of the church. Fisher wrote that the fire was small, destroying the nursery room but leaving the rest of the church untouched, except by graffiti.

The next day, police and National Guard troops cleared out demonstrators in the immediate area around the church, using tear gas, smoke canisters, and pepper balls. The clearing operation initially began for the installation of anti-scale fencing. The Park Police incident commander was reportedly stunned when Attorney General Barr informed him of Trump's impending visit and wanted the process sped up. The Episcopal Bishop of Washington, Mariann Budde, who oversees the church, criticized the use of tear gas to clear the grounds of the church for a photo opportunity "as a backdrop for a message antithetical to the teachings of Jesus".

== Design ==
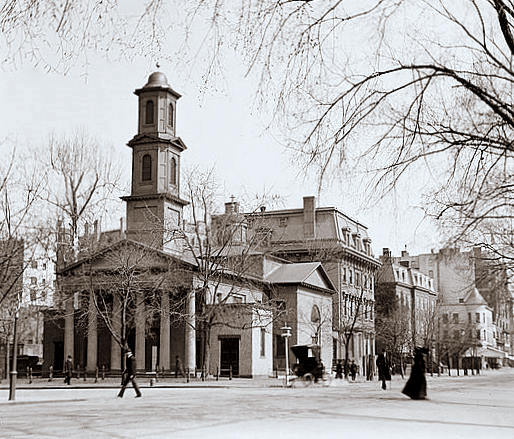
St. John's Episcopal Church in 1918

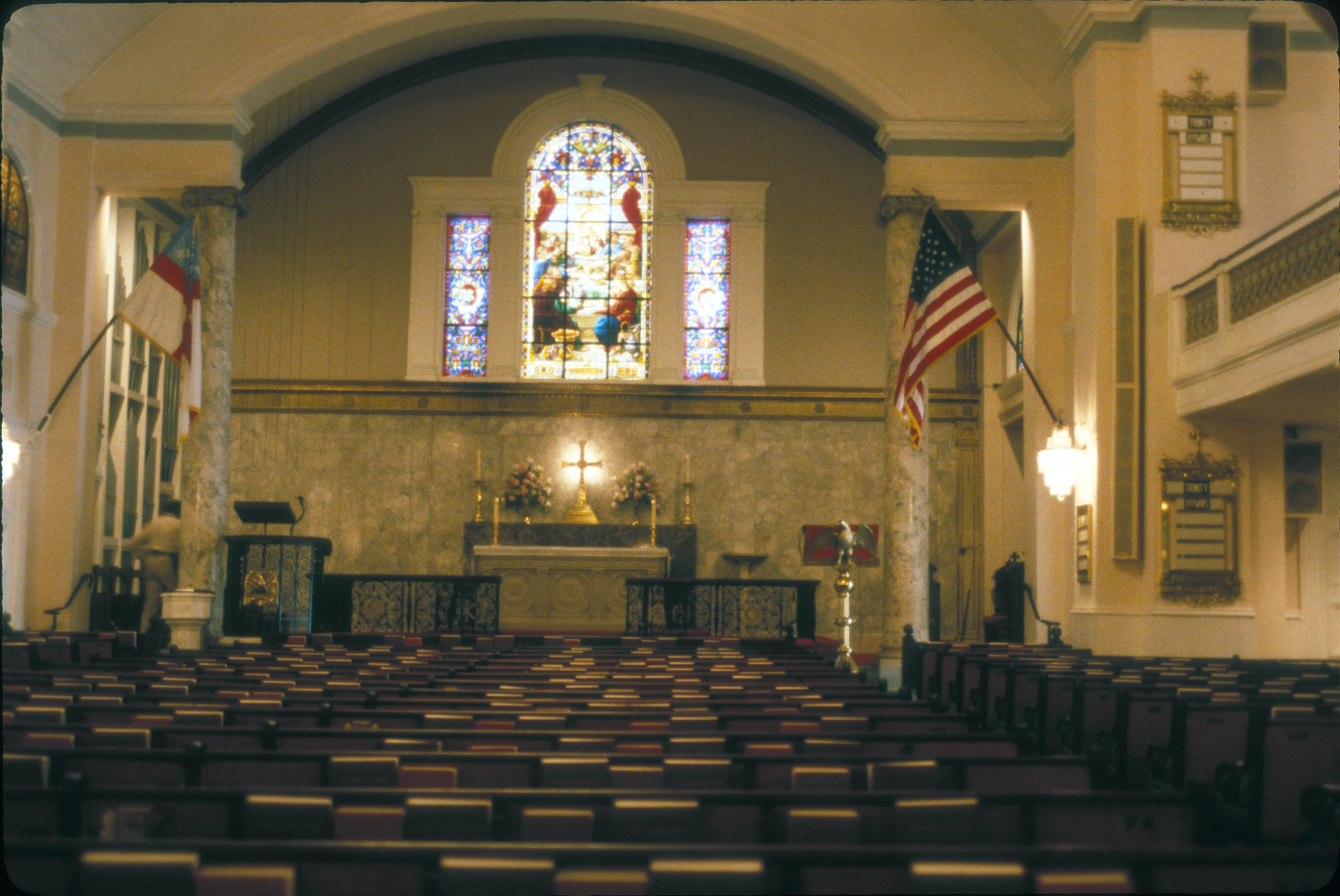
Interior

In 1966, St. John's Church was placed on the National Register of Historic Places by the U.S. Department of the Interior, and is designated a contributing property to the Lafayette Square Historic District and Sixteenth Street Historic District.

The church building was designed by Benjamin Latrobe, architect of the U.S. Capitol Building, and is constructed of stucco-covered brick, taking the form of a Greek cross. In 1820, the portico and tower were added.

The bell in St. John's steeple weighs nearly 1,000 pounds (450 kg). It was cast by Paul Revere's son, Joseph, at his Boston foundry in August 1822 and installed at St. John's on November 30, 1822. President James Monroe authorized a $100 contribution of public funds toward the purchase of this church bell, which also served as an alarm bell for the neighborhoods and public buildings in the vicinity of the church. St. John's bell is one of two Revere bells in Washington, both cast and installed in 1822. Of the two, St. John's bell is the only one that has been in continuous service since its installation. According to at least two accounts, whenever the bell tolls because of the death of a notable person, six ghostly men in white robes appear in the president's pew at midnight and then vanish.

Artwork in the church includes two sculptures by Jay Hall Carpenter, a chapel cross in polished brass, and Ascent Into Heaven, a 3/4 lifesize bronze angel and child overlooking the church's columbarium.

== See also ==
- Black Lives Matter Plaza, formerly outside the church
- List of National Historic Landmarks in Washington, D.C.
- National Register of Historic Places listings in central Washington, D.C.

== Bibliography ==
- Hein, David. "For God and Country: Two Historic Churches in the Nation's Capital." Anglican and Episcopal History 56 (March 1987): 123–26.
