= John S. Gallaher =

American politician and newspaperman (1796–1877)

Third Auditor of the United States Department of the Treasury
- In office October 22, 1849 – April 1858
- Preceded by: Peter Hagner
- Succeeded by: Francis Burt

Member of the Virginia Senate from the Frederick, Jefferson and Clarke counties district
- In office 1844–1848
- Preceded by: Robert Y. Conrad
- Succeeded by: Hierome L. Opie Jr.

Member of the Virginia House of Delegates from the Jefferson County district
- In office 1842–1844 Serving with William C. Worthington, William F. Turner
- Preceded by: John Moler and Anthony Kennedy
- Succeeded by: William F. Turner and Benjamin T. Towner
- In office 1830–1835 Serving with Edward Lucas Jr., Henry Berry, Gerard B. Wager
- Preceded by: Bushrod C. Washington and Daniel Morgan
- Succeeded by: Thomas Griggs Jr. and Henry Berry

Personal details
- Born: December 1, 1796 Martinsburg, Virginia, U.S.
- Died: February 4, 1877 (aged 80) Washington, D.C., U.S.
- Resting place: Edge Hill Cemetery
- Party: Whig
- Spouse: Catherine S. (died 1874)
- Children: 1
- Occupation: Politician; editor; newspaper owner; journalist

John S. Gallaher (December 1, 1796 – February 4, 1877) was an American politician and newspaperman from Virginia. He served as a member of the Virginia House of Delegates from 1830 to 1835 and 1842 to 1844. He was a member of the Virginia Senate from 1844 to 1848. He founded Virginia Free Press. He served as the Third Auditor of the United States Department of the Treasury under Presidents Taylor and Fillmore from 1849 to 1858.

== Early life ==
John S. Gallaher was born on December 1, 1796, in Martinsburg, Virginia. From the ages of five to twelve, he was taught in a school house by James Maxwell, the county surveyor.

On April 4, 1809, Gallaher joined the printing office of John Alburtis of the Berkeley and Jefferson Intelligencer (later the Martinsburg Gazette) in Martinsburg. After an apprenticeship of five years, he worked a few weeks in Baltimore mostly with Nile's Register. By the age of 18, he had worked in the editorial office of the Farmers' Repository under Richard Williams. Following Williams's departure to serve during the War of 1812, Gallaher took over as editor.

== Career ==
Gallaher volunteered to serve during the War of 1812, but was refused due to his age. He later volunteered with Geroge W. Humphrey's volunteer rifle company in 1814 and the company was sent to Washington, D.C. He served for seven weeks until the war concluded. The company was involved in a conflict at the White House Bluff on the Potomac River as British vessels left Alexandria. He stayed in Washington, D.C., as foreman of the Gazette and wrote columns for the National Intelligencer for about a year.

In 1821, Gallaher founded with his brother Robert the Virginia Free Press at Harper's Ferry. In 1827, he moved the paper to Charles Town. He purchased the Farmers Repository from Richard Williams and merged the paper with the Virginia Free Press. In 1824, he published and served as editor of The Ladies' Garland, a literary paper. He published the paper for four years.

Gallaher was a Whig. He served in the Virginia House of Delegates, representing Jefferson County, from 1830 to 1835. In 1832, he was appointed as commissioner alongside James Faulkner and John B. D. Smith to settle the boundary line of Virginia. In 1833, he faced opposition due to a "state's right vote" that displeased Whig supporters. During his time in the legislature and with the Free Press, he was associated with the Baltimore and Ohio passing through the Virginia territory.

In 1835, Gallaher moved to Richmond and purchased and acted as editor of The Times and Compiler for 19 months alongside Mr. Davis. In January 1837, he purchased a third interest in the Richmond Whig and became associated with journalists John Hampden Pleasants and Alexander Mosely. In 1840, he sold his interest to his partners. In 1840, he published for nine months The Yeoman, a paper in support of the campaign of William Henry Harrison and John Tyler.

In the fall of 1841, Gallaher moved back to Jefferson County due to poor health. He assumed the role of chief editor of The Free Press. He then served in the Virginia House of Delegates, representing Jefferson County, from 1842 to 1844. From 1844 to 1848, he represented Clarke, Frederick, and Jefferson counties in the Virginia Senate. During his senate tenure, President John Tyler offered Gallaher a command in the United States Army for the annexation of Texas, but Tyler was defeated in the U.S. Senate and Gallaher declined the command. He was defeated for re-election in the state senate by Hierome L. Opie Jr. According to Aler's History of Martinsburg, his defeat can be attributed to his bill for free schools in Jefferson County. He was an advocate of the Virginia public school system. He was also editor and owner of the Winchester Republican during this time. In 1846, he helped contribute to the Richmond Daily Republican, a paper run by his son Robert H.

Gallaher served as a magistrate and member of the Jefferson County Court. On October 22, 1849, President Zachary Taylor appointed him to succeed Peter Hagner as the Third Auditor of the United States Department of the Treasury. He remained in the role under the Fillmore Administration. In April 1858, he was dismissed by President Franklin Pierce and succeeded by Francis Burt. His friend Seaton Gales then assigned him as a member of the editorial staff of the National Intelligencer. During this time, he also contributed to a paper owned by Gales in North Carolina. He was a clerk in the Quartermaster General's office for 15 years until a few months prior to his death.

== Personal life ==
Gallaher married Catherine S. She died in 1874.

Gallaher died on February 4, 1877, at his home on F Street in Washington, D.C. He was buried in Edge Hill Cemetery.
