= Alexander Burton Hagner =

American judge

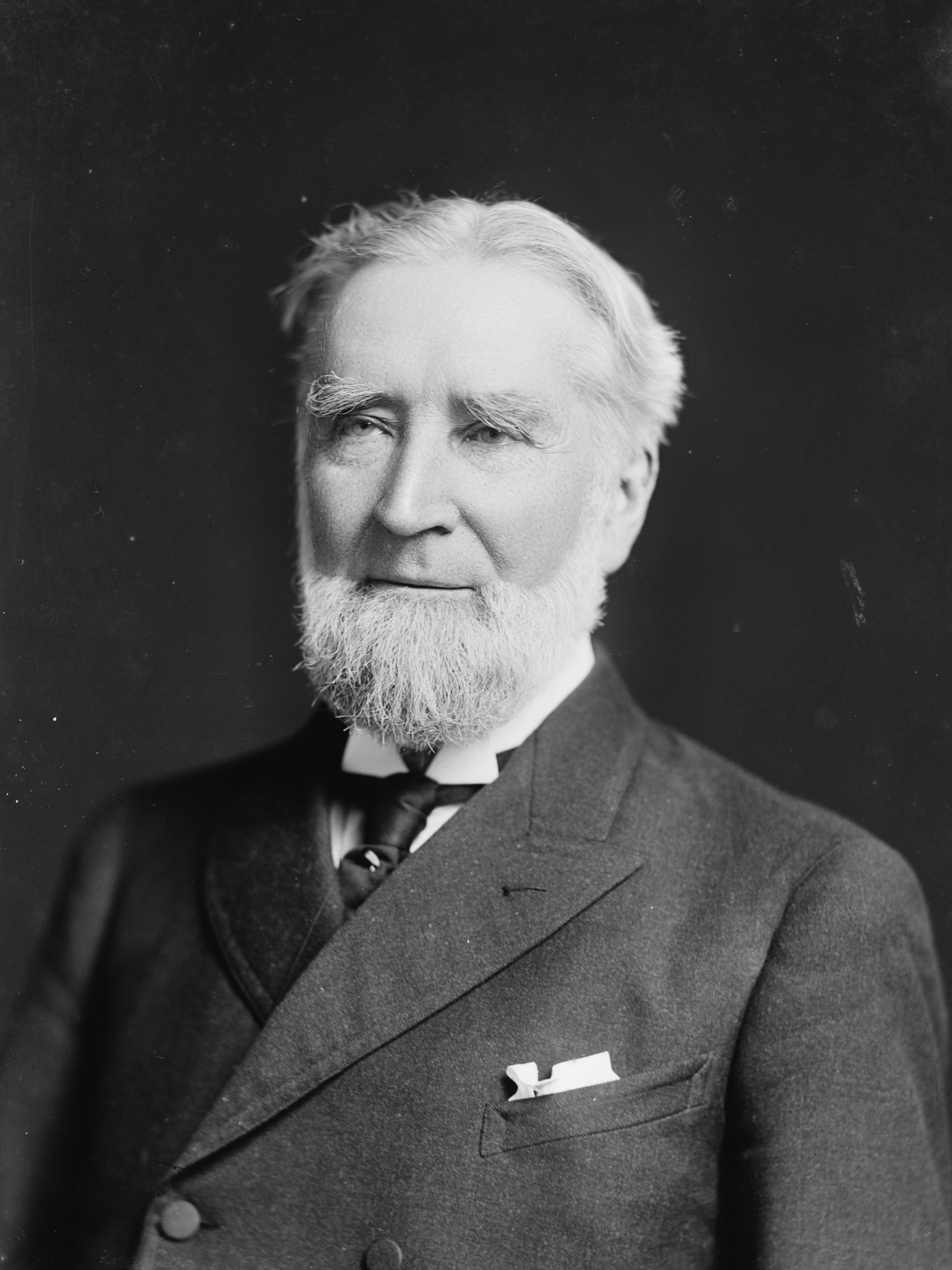
- Hagner c. 1905

Associate Justice of the Supreme Court of the District of Columbia
- In office January 21, 1879 – June 1, 1903
- Appointed by: Rutherford B. Hayes
- Preceded by: Abram B. Olin
- Succeeded by: Daniel Thew Wright

Member of the Maryland House of Delegates
- In office 1854-1855

Personal details
- Born: Alexander Burton Hagner; July 13, 1826 Washington, D.C., U.S.
- Died: June 30, 1915 (aged 88) Washington, D.C., U.S.
- Resting place: Oak Hill Cemetery; Washington, D.C., U.S.
- Spouse: Louisa Randolph Harrison (m. 1853; died 1905)
- Parents: Peter Hagner (father); Frances Randall Hagner (mother)
- Relatives: Peter V. Hagner (brother) and 8 other siblings
- Education: St. John's College; Princeton University (A.B.) read law

Alexander Burton Hagner (July 13, 1826 – June 30, 1915) was an Associate Justice of the Supreme Court of the District of Columbia.

== Early life ==
Born in Washington, D.C., "Aleck" Hagner was a son of Frances Randall and Peter Hagner and younger brother to Gen. Peter Valentine Hagner. As a schoolboy, Hagner attended the Georgetown Classical and Mathematical Academy on West Street, St. John's College in Annapolis, Maryland, and received an Artium Baccalaureus degree from Princeton University in 1845 before reading law to enter the bar in 1848.

== Career ==
He was in private practice in Annapolis with his uncle Alexander Randall from 1848 to 1879. He was a member of the Maryland House of Delegates from 1854 to 1855, also serving as a Special Judge of the Circuit Court for Prince George's County, Maryland. In 1879, he left Annapolis to return to his birthplace, Washington, D.C., where he was an Associate Justice of the District of Columbia Supreme Court until his retirement in 1903.

== Legal Career in Annapolis (1845-1879) ==
Immediately after graduating from Princeton, Hagner moved to Annapolis to clerk for his uncle, Alexander Randall. He was admitted to the Maryland bar in March 1848 and he remained as a partner with Randall for the next 35 years at their law firm Randall & Hagner, his office on West Street near the courthouse and Farmers Bank.

Two years later, he acted as Judge Advocate of a Naval Court of Inquiry in the matter of Commander Hunter (who stood accused of exceeding his authority when he accepted the surrender of Alvarado).

Over the course of his legal career, Hagner acted in many cases, including mandamus cases Marshall v Harwood, Magruder v Swann (1866), and Gwinn v Groome.

In 1860, he and Randall were appointed by the Governor as Maryland counsel to investigate a controversial extra B&O dividend (declared in 1856).

In August 1863, Hagner met with President Lincoln and was successful in lifting the arrest warrant for the Reverend Peyton Harrison (a cousin of Louisa Hagner). In 1865, he acted as Special Judge in Prince George's County when Judge Berry was disqualified

In 1871, he was part of the defense team for Ellen Wharton's two sensational murder trials in Annapolis. In 1875, he represented Severn Teackle Wallis when Wallis challenged election results in his run for state Attorney General. In the centennial year, he was a Judge Advocate of the Naval General Court in San Francisco at trial of Pay Inspector Spalding. He was also counsel for Farmers' National Bank, which held state funds.

== Political career (1852–1881) ==
Hagner, a Whig, was actively involved in local and national politics, albeit largely unsuccessful in being elected. In September 1852, he gave an address to a Whig gathering at Taylor's Wharf, Annapolis; the following April, he made an unsuccessful bid for Annapolis City Recorder.

He was, however, elected to the Maryland House of Delegates that November, where he served as Chairman of the Ways and Means Committee. In this capacity, he orchestrated the consolidation of the Baltimore & Susquehanna, York & Maryland, York & Cumberland, and Susquehanna Railroads under new name of the Northern Central. During this time, tracks were laid to Sunbury PA, making a continuous line from Baltimore to Buffalo which was thirty miles shorter than that from New York to Buffalo. This brought significant financial benefits to Maryland and to Baltimore City.

In 1859 he lost his bid for Congress (from Maryland's sixth district) to George Wurtz Hughes; he lost a second time in 1874.

In 1860, he was an Elector on the Bell and Everett ticket, making speeches at Port Tobacco and in Baltimore. The next year, Hagner was on a committee composed of Judge Carmichael, Ross Winans, William Goldsborough, John Contee, and Bowie Davis. They met with Governor Hicks and advised acceptance of the Crittenden Compromise. He gave speeches to the "workingmen" of Annapolis urging them to remain in the Union. At the time of the Pratt Street Riots in Baltimore, Hagner, Naval Academy Superintendent George S. Blake and Annapolis Mayor John R. Magruder (Hagner's first cousin) again visited Hicks on April 29, after Benjamin Butler's arrival with troops in Annapolis.

In 1864, Hagner declined an offer for nomination for a seat on the state constitutional committee. Though he was proposed in 1875 by the Towsontown Journal as candidate for "a good Governor" and spoke out strongly in a speech at the Maryland Institute against fraudulent elections, nothing came of it. His last attempt was in 1881, an unsuccessful bid for the U.S. Supreme Court.

== Federal judicial service (1879-1903) ==
Hagner was nominated by President Rutherford B. Hayes on January 17, 1879, to an Associate Justice seat on the Supreme Court of the District of Columbia (now the United States District Court for the District of Columbia) vacated by Associate Justice Abram B. Olin. He was confirmed by the United States Senate on January 21, 1879, and received his commission the same day.

Over the course of his Washington career (1879-1903), he presided over many criminal and civil cases. In 1882, he was one of three justices presiding over President Garfield assassin Guiteau's motion for a new trial. Other cases on his watch were the Potawatomi Indians' land dispute, a challenge to the Constitutionality of the Income Tax Act (1895), a dispute over Frederick Douglass' will (1895–98), Potomac Flats matter determining boundaries of the District of Columbia (he wrote a lengthy opinion on it in 1895, reaching centuries back into English law for precedent), and in 1898, he granted a divorce decree to Frances Hodgson Burnett.

His written works include Memorial of James Clarke Welling, (Records of the Columbia Historical Society, Washington, D.C. Vol. 1 (1897), pp. 45–54, 1894); Street Nomenclature of Washington City (1897); History and Reminiscences of St. John's Church, Washington, D.C. (Records of the Columbia Historical Society, Washington, D.C., Vol. 12 (1909), pp. 89–114); and A Personal Narrative of the Acquaintance of My Father and Myself with Each of the Presidents of the United States, (published posthumously in 1915).

His service on the District bench ended on June 1, 1903, when he retired at age 77.

== Personal life ==
Hagner married Louisa Randolph Harrison (1829-1905) at Elk Hill Virginia on May 26, 1853. Born in Richmond, she was the daughter of Heningham Wills and Randolph Harrison of Elk Hill, Goochland County, Virginia. They did not have any children, though they claimed two foster sons, children of Hagner's older brother Randall who, along with Randall's wife, had died leaving the boys orphaned at very young ages. Aleck Hagner acted as grandfather to the boys' children, one of whom was Isabella Hagner James, White House Secretary to Edith Carow Roosevelt. He was a vestryman and member of St. John's Church, Lafayette Square.

Hagner died on June 30, 1915, in Washington, D.C. His funeral was held at St. John's Church, Lafayette Square and he was buried at Oak Hill Cemetery in Washington, D.C.

Legal offices
Preceded by Abram B. Olin	Associate Justice of the Supreme Court of the District of Columbia; 1879–1903	Succeeded by Daniel Thew Wright
