= Margaret Bayard Smith =

American writer (1778–1844)

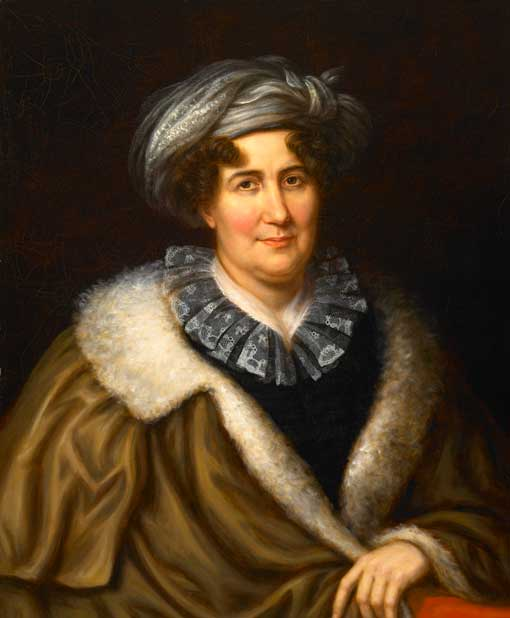
- Portrait of Smith, by Charles Bird King
- Born: Margaret Bayard; February 20, 1778; Pennsylvania
- Died: June 7, 1844 (aged 66)
- Spouse: Samuel Harrison Smith (m. 1800)
- Children: 4
- Parent(s): John Bubenheim Bayard; Margaret Hodge
- Relatives: James Asheton Bayard II (cousin); Charles Hodge (cousin)

Margaret Bayard Smith (February 20, 1778 – June 7, 1844) was an American writer and political commentator in the early Republic of the United States, a time when women generally lived within strict gender roles. Her writings and relationships shaped both politics and society in the capital of early Washington, DC. Her literary reputation is based primarily on a collection of her letters and notebooks written from 1800 to 1841, and published posthumously in 1906 as The First Forty Years of Washington Society, edited by Gaillard Hunt.

Smith began writing books in the 1820s: a two-volume novel in 1824 called A Winter in Washington, or Memoirs of the Seymour Family, and What is Gentility? (1825). She also wrote several biographical profiles, including one of her close friend Dolley Madison for the National Portrait Gallery of Distinguished Americans, published in 1836.

== Early life ==
Margaret Bayard was born on February 20, 1778 in rural Pennsylvania, the seventh of eight children born to Colonel John Bubenheim Bayard (1738–1807) and the former Margaret Hodge (1740–1780). At the time of her birth during the Revolutionary War, her father was serving with George Washington at Valley Forge. One of her first cousins was Rev. Charles Hodge (1797–1878). Her mother died in 1780, when Margaret was a toddler. Her father remarried to Mary (née Grant) Hodgson (d. 1785), a widow of John Hodgson of South Carolina. She died in 1785. John Bayard married again to Johannah White (d. 1834), sister of General Anthony Walton White (1750–1803).

Margaret Bayard was educated at a Moravian boarding school in Bethlehem, Pennsylvania. She later "read widely in the classics, sciences, and literature while living with a married sister in New Brunswick, New Jersey." Their father and stepmother had also settled in New Brunswick; he was elected as mayor in 1790.

Her father's twin brother, Dr. James Asheton Bayard (1738–1770), married her mother's sister, Ann Hodge. They had three children together, but both parents died when the children were young. The three orphans were raised by John and Margaret Bayard, and were part of their large household. One was James A. Bayard. He later became a lawyer and politician.

== Marriage and family ==
At age 22, Margaret Bayard married Samuel Harrison Smith (1772–1845), her second cousin, on September 29, 1800. That year they moved to Washington, DC, the new capital where the government had relocated. Soon after the birth of their first child in 1801, the family bought a farm, Turkey Thicket, three miles from town (land that is now part of Catholic University). They renamed the farm Sidney. Together, they were the parents of:

- Julia Harrison Smith (b. 1801)
- Susan Harrison Smith (b. 1804)
- Jonathan Bayard Harrison Smith (1810–1889). He became a lawyer in the capital and married Henrietta Elizabeth Henley in 1842, daughter of Com. John Dandridge Henley.
- Anna Maria Harrison Smith (b. 1811)

== Career ==
Samuel Smith was already a well-known editor and publisher who befriended Thomas Jefferson when they both acted as officers of the American Philosophical Society, based in Philadelphia, Pennsylvania when it served as the temporary capital.

After moving to Washington in 1800, Margaret Smith and her husband became quickly part of the political and social elite, a political power couple. Samuel Smith established the first newspaper in Washington City, the Daily Intelligencer. When Jefferson took office as president, his administration awarded Smith a government contract to print the House of Representatives' Journal. Margaret Smith's ability to write about her observations made her an ideal partner for her husband. She often wrote for the Intelligencer and other publications, most often anonymously, but sometimes under her own name.

As a woman, her role in the new republic was expected to be exclusively domestic. Margaret Smith used this expectation to her advantage by quickly immersing herself in Washington life: befriending local families and politicians, and strengthening her relationships with previous acquaintances. Doris Kearns Goodwin's history of Abraham Lincoln and his cabinet showed how important women were to political life in Washington. Most notably, the Smith couple became frequent guests at the Jefferson White House. Margaret Smith used her nearly unlimited access to political figures and inside knowledge of Washington to become an authority on Washington politics and the shaping of the new republic.

She wrote numerous letters to her sisters, and sisters-in-law, which are considered insightful about the political landscape of Washington. Her letters were the first step in establishing herself as a legitimate political thinker. The information in her letters was later published in the Richmond Enquirer and finally collected in a 1906 memoir under her name, which was edited and published posthumously. It was more a political and social exploration of Washington than a description of her own life.

I am a woman. And society says, 'Thus far and no further [shall] thou come'—Why then has nature given me a mind so active and enquiring?

— Margaret Bayard Smith

Her skill and enduring legacy is expressed in her writings on presidents Thomas Jefferson and on James Madison in the summer of 1809, during the first year of his presidency. She was aware of the state of the nation and understood that the citizenry was in need of reassurance regarding the president's leadership. Her commentary during her summer trip firmly established Jefferson's legacy as president, as well as shaping his image as "the Sage of Monticello." While visiting Montpelier, the Virginia home of James and Dolley Madison, Smith keenly observed Dolley's hospitality and her political performance as the wife of the President. The ease of Dolley's entertaining became her trademark, and Smith wrote about it in great detail.

Margaret Bayard Smith reassured the public through her writings that the government was in good hands. She accomplished this at a time when most women were confined to more domestic roles.

== Death ==
Margaret Bayard Smith died on June 7, 1844.

=== Descendants ===
Through her son, Margaret Bayard Smith was the grandmother of John Henley Smith (c. 1844–1907), who married Rebecca Young; Samuel Harrison Smith, who married Alice Hall; and Bayard Thornton Smith (b. 1857), who married Eleanor J. Hyde (d. 1929) (the daughter of George Hyde (1819–1890), an early settler elected in 1882 as the Alcalde of San Francisco).
