= Samuel Harrison Smith (printer) =

American journalist (1772–1845)

- Born: January 27, 1772; Philadelphia, Pennsylvania, U.S.
- Died: November 1, 1845 (aged 73); Washington, D.C., U.S.
- Known for: Founder of the National Intelligencer
- Spouse: Margaret Bayard Smith (m. 1800; died 1844)
- Children: 4

Samuel Harrison Smith (January 27, 1772 – November 1, 1845) was an American journalist and newspaper publisher. He founded the National Intelligencer at Washington in 1800. He was elected a member of the American Philosophical Society in 1797.

== Career ==
In 1800, Smith founded National intelligencer, and Washington advertiser, which became the dominant newspaper of the capital. Joseph Gales joined the newspaper becoming his assistant in 1807, and took over the paper as its sole proprietor in 1810.

Smith was a friend, confidant and counselor to the third U.S. President Thomas Jefferson. In February 1801, Smith published Jefferson's Manual, "A Manual of Parliamentary Practice for the Use of the Senate of the United States."

In 1813, Smith was appointed Commissioner of the Revenue for the United States Treasury Department by President Madison. On September 30, 1814, he was appointed as Secretary of the Treasury, ad interim, until a new cabinet officer was chosen.

During the period 1809–19, Smith served as president of the Bank of Washington. He served as president of the Washington branch of the Bank of the United States from 1819 until the position was abolished in 1835.

== Personal life ==
Smith was the son of Jonathan Bayard Smith, signatory to the Articles of Confederation. On September 29, 1800, Smith married Margaret Bayard (1778–1844), his second cousin and a daughter of John Bubenheim Bayard and Margaret (Hodge) Bayard. His wife was a first cousin of U.S. Senator James A. Bayard, who was highly influential in the 1800 presidential election where Jefferson was elected.

They moved to Washington, D.C., the new seat of government. Soon after the birth of their first child was born in 1801, the family bought a farm, Turkey Thicket, three miles from town (now part of Catholic University). They renamed the farm Sidney. Together, they were the parents of:

- Julia Harrison Smith (b. 1801)
- Susan Harrison Smith (b. 1804)
- Jonathan Bayard Harrison Smith (1810–1889), became a lawyer in the capital and married Henrietta Elizabeth Henley, daughter of Com. John Dandridge Henley in 1842.
- Anna Maria Harrison Smith (b. 1811)

Margaret died on June 7, 1844. Samuel died a little more than a year later on November 1, 1845, in Washington.
