= Joseph Gales =

American journalist and politician (1786–1860)

Joseph Gales Jr.
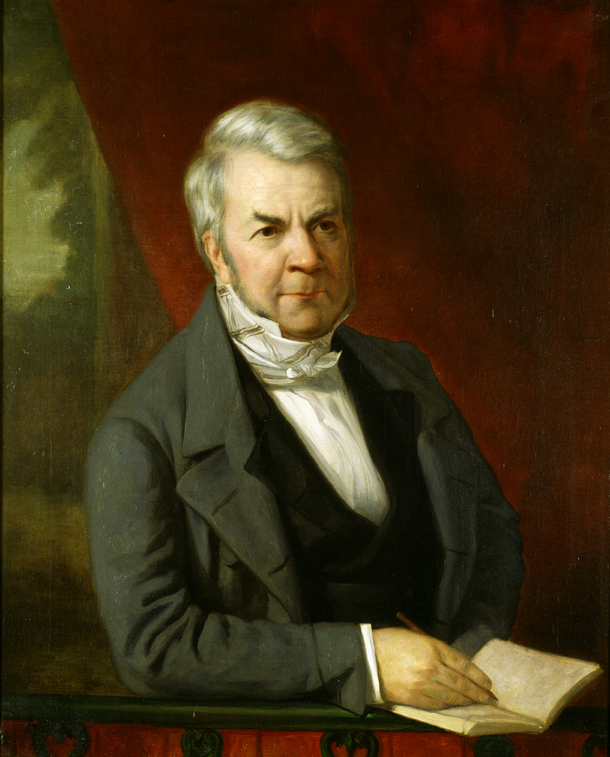

9th Mayor of the City of Washington, D.C.
- In office 11 June 1827 – 14 June 1830
- Preceded by: Roger C. Weightman
- Succeeded by: John Peter Van Ness

Personal details
- Born: 10 April 1786 Sheffield, Yorkshire
- Died: 21 June 1860 (aged 74) Washington, D.C.
- Resting place: Congressional Cemetery
- Party: Independent
- Occupation: Printer/publisher/reporter, National Intelligencer
- Known for: Mayor of Washington, D.C., founded St. John's Episcopal Church, Lafayette Square

Joseph Gales Jr. (10 April 1786 – 21 July 1860) was an American journalist and the ninth mayor of Washington, D.C. The city's only mayor born outside of North America, Gales served from 1827 to 1830.

== Early life ==
Joseph Gales Jr. was born in Sheffield, Yorkshire, England. His father, Joseph Gales Sr. (1760–1841), was a printer in Sheffield, who was compelled to emigrate to America in 1795 because of his republican principles. After living in Philadelphia from 1795 to 1799 where the elder Gales transcribed the debates in Congress and owned the Independent Gazetteer, he moved with his family to Raleigh, North Carolina. Gales Jr. was educated at the University of North Carolina at Chapel Hill and in 1807 settled in Washington, D.C.

=== Newspaperman ===
Gales began his career as a reporter for the National Intelligencer newspaper in 1807, covering the debates in Congress. He became the assistant and partner of publisher Samuel Harrison Smith. In 1810 became sole proprietor of the journal, and made it a triweekly publication. Three years later, in partnership with his brother-in-law, William Winston Seaton, he made it a daily newspaper.

Increasingly, the National Intelligencer became a political newspaper, a spokesman for the opponents of Andrew Jackson and supporters of John Quincy Adams, Henry Clay, and the Whig Party. (In 1851, the Washington Daily Globe would replace it as the official reporter for Congress, and circulation would decline. The paper would finally fold in 1867, years after Gales' death.)

=== Printer ===
For many years Gales and Seaton were the official printers to Congress, and the files of the National Intelligencer, containing a running account of the debates in both Houses, are one of the most valuable sources of United States congressional history for more than a quarter of a century. Under the title of Annals of Congress, Gales and Seaton published (1834–56, in 42 volumes) the debates in Congress from 1798 to 1824, together with the more important documents and laws, and under the title of Register of Debates in Congress (29 volumes) continued the publication in similar form to cover the years (1824–37). Gales was long the sole reporter on the U.S. Senate.

=== Societies ===
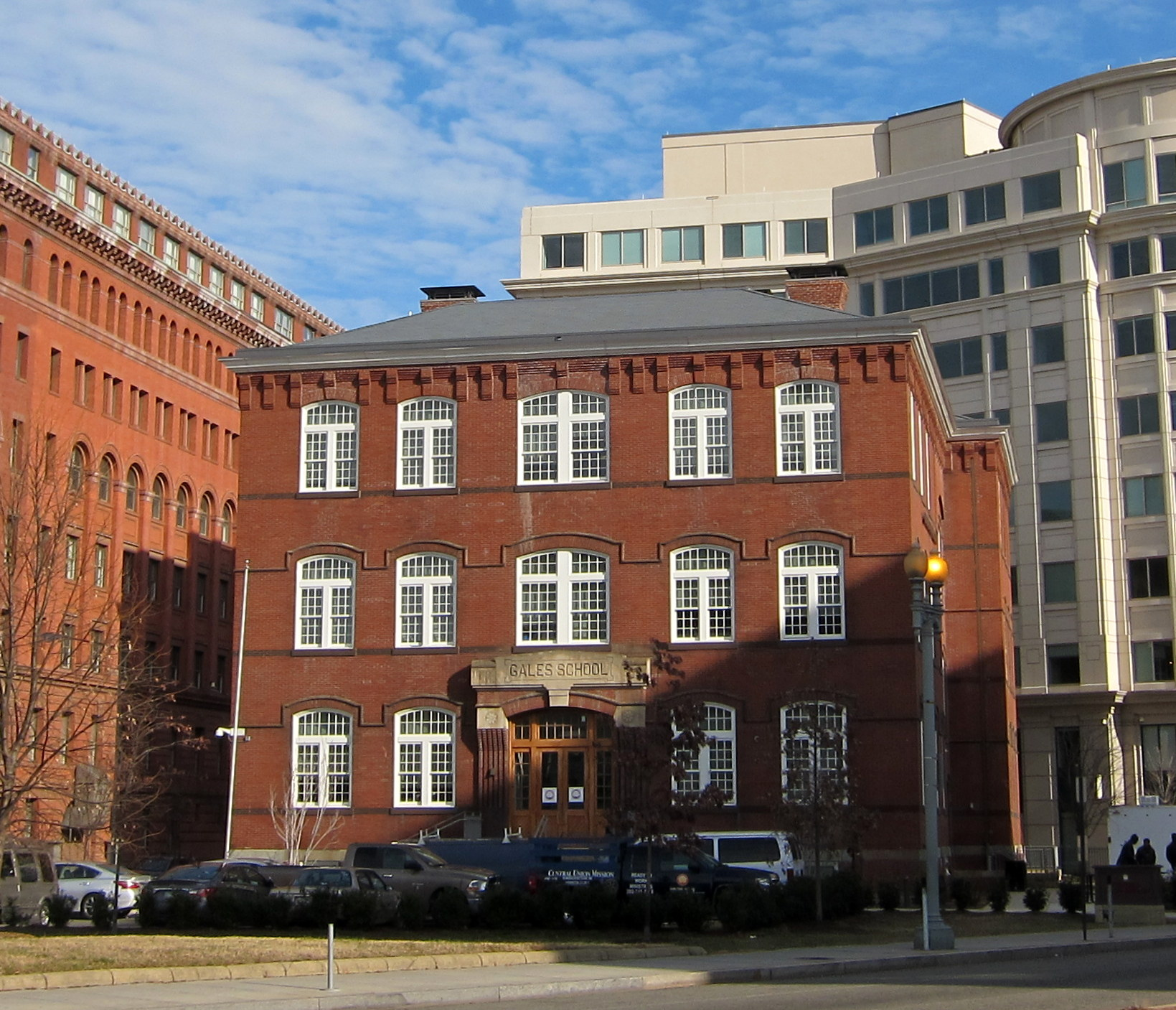
The former Gales School in Washington, D.C., houses the Central Union Mission.

During the 1820s, Gales was a member of the prestigious society, Columbian Institute for the Promotion of Arts and Sciences, who counted among their members former presidents Andrew Jackson and John Quincy Adams and many prominent men of the day, including well-known representatives of the military, government service, medical and other professions.

=== Mayor of Washington ===
Gales was elected Washington Alderman in 1814. In 1827, the city council elected him to fill out the term of the resigning Roger C. Weightman. He was then elected to his own two-year term in 1828. As mayor, he broke ground on the District of Columbia's C&O Canal. He also established relief committees for the poor and dispossessed of Washington.

=== Later life ===
In 1830, Gales built a "country mansion" near the old Brentwood Road on 112 acres of land he bought in 1815. He named the estate for his town of birth, Eckington and it became the namesake of Washington, D.C.'s Eckington neighborhood. The house was sold to George Truesdale, who turned it into a hotel and then, following a fire that nearly destroyed it, into a women's college known as Washington College for Young Ladies. By 1922 it became the Mt. Carmel Retreat House for Women run by the Catholic Church.

Gales died on 21 July 1860, and was buried in Congressional Cemetery.

Political offices
Preceded by Roger C. Weightman	Mayor of Washington, D.C. 1827–1830	Succeeded by John P. Van Ness
