= Abram B. Olin =

American judge

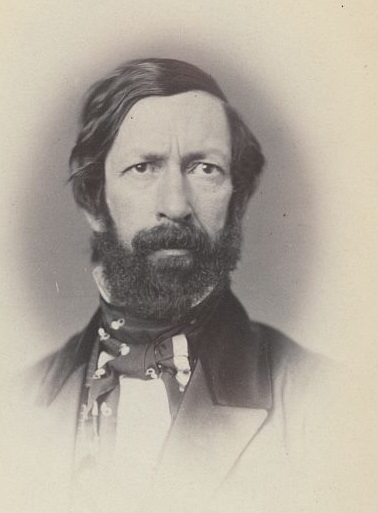

Associate Justice of the Supreme Court of the District of Columbia
- In office March 11, 1863 – January 13, 1879
- Appointed by: Abraham Lincoln
- Preceded by: Seat established by 12 Stat. 762
- Succeeded by: Alexander Burton Hagner

Member of the U.S. House of Representatives from New York's 13th district
- In office March 4, 1857 – March 3, 1863
- Preceded by: Russell Sage
- Succeeded by: John B. Steele

Personal details
- Born: Abram Baldwin Olin; September 21, 1808 Shaftsbury, Vermont
- Died: July 7, 1879 (aged 70) Sligo, Maryland
- Resting place: West Lawn Cemetery; Williamstown, Massachusetts
- Party: Republican
- Parents: Gideon Olin (father); Lydia Myres Pope (mother)
- Relatives: Henry Olin
- Education: Williams College read law

Abram Baldwin Olin (September 21, 1808 – July 7, 1879) was a United States representative from New York and an Associate Justice of the Supreme Court of the District of Columbia.

== Early life ==
Olin was born on September 21, 1808, in Shaftsbury, Bennington County, Vermont, Olin was a youngers son of Gideon Olin, a United States representative from Vermont, and his second wife, Lydia Myres Pope Olin. He was the cousin of Henry Olin, also a United States Representative from Vermont.

Olin attended the common schools, then graduated from Williams College in Williamstown, Massachusetts in 1835, and read law in 1838.

== Career ==
He was admitted to the bar and entered private practice in Troy, New York from 1838 to 1856. He was city recorder for Troy from 1844 to 1852.

=== Congressional service ===
Olin was elected as a Republican from New York's 13th congressional district to the United States House of Representatives of the 35th, 36th and 37th United States Congresses, serving from March 4, 1857, to March 3, 1863.

=== Federal judicial service ===
Olin was nominated by President Abraham Lincoln on March 10, 1863, to the Supreme Court of the District of Columbia (now the United States District Court for the District of Columbia), to a new Associate Justice seat authorized by 12 Stat. 762. He was confirmed by the United States Senate on March 11, 1863, and received his commission the same day. His service terminated on January 13, 1879, due to his retirement. He was succeeded by Alexander Burton Hagner.

== Personal life ==
After being ill for several weeks, Olin died on July 7, 1879, at his residence near Sligo in Montgomery County, Maryland (now part of Silver Spring). He was interred in the Danforth family lot adjacent to West Lawn Cemetery in Williamstown, Berkshire County, Massachusetts.

U.S. House of Representatives
Preceded by Russell Sage	Member of the U.S. House of Representatives from New York's 13th congressional district 1857–1863	Succeeded by John B. Steele
Legal offices
Preceded by Seat established by 12 Stat. 762	Associate Justice of the Supreme Court of the District of Columbia; 1863–1879	Succeeded by Alexander Burton Hagner
