= Winifred Gales =

American novelist (1761–1839)

Winifred Marshall Gales (10 July 1761 – 26 June 1839) was an American novelist and memoirist. Gales was born in 1761 in Newark-upon-Trent, England, the daughter of John Marshall. She wrote the first novel published by a resident in North Carolina.

== Biography ==
She exhibited literary talent at an early age and in 1787 published her first novel, The History of Lady Emma Melcombe, and Her Family. Aged 23, she married Joseph Gales Sr., a liberal reform supporter and abolitionist. The couple lived in Sheffield from around 1784, and together ran the Hartshead Press, which printed The Sheffield Register. Because of his views, in 1794 he eventually fled England for continental Europe, leaving Winifred in charge of the family bookstore and printing press. She continued to run the Hartshead Press until Joseph Gales' creditors enforced the couple's bankruptcy in 1796. In the months between her husband's emigration and her own, Gales supported her unmarried sisters-in-law in their own bookselling and stationery business. With the political climate in England and a warrant for his arrest precluding her husband's return, Winifred Gales sold the Sheffield Register newspaper to its assistant editor, James Montgomery, who renamed it The Iris, and joined her husband in Altona in the Duchy of Holstein, Holy Roman Empire.

In 1795, the Gales family sailed to Philadelphia and four years later settled in Raleigh, North Carolina where Joseph Gales became editor and printer of The Raleigh Register, a newspaper supporting Jeffersonian Republicanism. In 1804, Gales published Matilda Berkely; or, Family Anecdotes, which is considered the first novel ever published in North Carolina by a resident of that state. Firm Unitarians and promoters of tolerance, the Gales left Raleigh for Washington, D.C. in 1833 amid growing orthodox trends in North Carolina. She died in Washington in 1833, and is buried in the Congressional Cemetery.

== List of works ==
- The History of Lady Emma Melcombe, and her Family, 1787.
- Matilda Berkeley, or, Family Anecdotes, 1804.
- "Recollections", 1815.

== See also ==
- Seaton Gales
