= Joseph Gales Sr. =

American journalist (1761–1841)

Joseph Gales (4 February 1761 – 21 July 1841) was an American journalist, newspaper publisher and political figure. He was the father of the younger Joseph Gales.

== Life in Britain ==
Gales was born in Eckington, Derbyshire, in England to Timothy Gales and Sarah (Clay). He left to undertake a printing apprenticeship in Manchester, but left after he was attacked by his master's wife. Soon after, he completed his apprenticeship with James Tomlinson in Newark, Nottinghamshire. While in Newark, he married Winifred Marshall, a novelist and political writer.

In 1784, Gales moved to Sheffield in Yorkshire. Shortly after moving to Sheffield, he became a Unitarian, and took up various Radical causes, advocating religious tolerance, Parliamentary reform and the abolition of slavery, and opposing boxing and bull-baiting.

Gales met Tom Paine, who encouraged him to found a radical newspaper. In June 1787, he began publishing the Sheffield Register, initially in partnership with David Martin. The newspaper focussed on reporting local news, and on reprinting tracts by reformers such as Paine and Joseph Priestley.

In 1789, Martin left the partnership. Gales' politics became more prominent. He welcomed the French Revolution, acclaiming the victory of "our French brethren over despots and despotism". He marked this by roasting an ox and carrying it in a procession through the town which was fired on by local authorities.

Gales was a founding member of the Sheffield Society for Constitutional Information. This was established in 1791, and with the support of Gales' newspaper, had over 2,000 members by the following year. It sent out "missionaries" to establish similar groups in Leeds, Birmingham and Coventry.

From 1792, troops were permanently billeted in Sheffield, and regular clashes took place on the streets. Gales established a fortnightly journal, the Sheffield Patriot, which explored political issues in more depth than the Register. He also established contact with the London Corresponding Society, began sitting on the Sheffield society's committee, and published the first cheap edition of Paine's Rights of Man.

In 1794, the Government began arresting leaders of the Corresponding Societies, and Gales wrote articles decrying this. Gales was suspected of writing a letter offering to sell pikes to the London society, but was on business in Derby when troops arrived to arrest him.

== Flight to Germany and United States ==
Now alarmed as to his safety, Gales published his final issue of the Register, noting that "convinced that by ruining my family and distressing my friends by risking either, would only gratify the ignorant and malignant, I shall seek that livelihood in another land which I cannot peaceably gain in this." He then fled to Hamburg in Germany. Winifred remained behind to sell the Register to James Montgomery before joining her husband.

Gales spent his time in Europe learning shorthand and several languages. In 1795, he traveled to Philadelphia, Pennsylvania, where he worked as a printer, bookkeeper and as a journalist covering the United States Congress. He then established the Independent Gazetteer newspaper.

== Political activity and journalism in America ==
He moved to Raleigh, North Carolina while suffering from yellow fever at the encouragement of Nathaniel Macon and other political figures. In October 1799, Gales published the first issue of his Raleigh Register. The paper, which continued after his death in the hands of his family, was influential throughout the state for the next sixty years. It became well known as a Whig-supporting paper.

From 1819 to 1833, Gales served as "intendant of police," or mayor, of Raleigh. He was also an officer in the local chapter of the American Colonization Society, and acted as state printer.

In his later years, Gales moved to Washington, D.C., and became treasurer of the National Colonization Society.

Gales returned to Raleigh in 1839. He was again elected mayor in January 1840 and held the office until his death in 1841. He is buried in Raleigh's City Cemetery.

== See also ==
- Seaton Gales

Media offices
Preceded by New position	Editor of the Sheffield Register; 1787–1794	Succeeded by James Montgomery
