= Seaton Gales =

American journalist

Seaton Gales (1828 - 1878) was editor of the Raleigh Register and a junior editor of the Raleigh Sentinel. He was a member of a prominent family of journalists in 19th century Raleigh, North Carolina. During the Reconstruction era he often referred to the United States flag as a rag. Gales once came to his home using an alternate route, in order to keep from passing under the flag.

== Family ==
Gales was the grandson of Winifred Marshall and Joseph Gales, Sr., a native of Sheffield, England, who founded the Raleigh Register in 1799. He published the newspaper for over forty years. Following his death in 1842, the father of Seaton Gales, Weston R., continued its publication.

One of Gales' sons, George M. Gales (1876 - 1954), worked with the Southern Railway as a young man. Afterward he was a stenographer for the American Tobacco Company, prior to becoming head of the National Cigar Stand Company. This firm was a subsidiary of United Drug Company. His older brother, Thomas Cameron Gales, entered the tobacco business as a young man, before going to New York City in 1902. He became a director of the American Cigar Company.
