= Peter Hagner =

Peter Hagner (October 1, 1772 – July 16, 1850) was a clerk in the accounting office of the United States War Department, 1793–1817, and Third Auditor of the United States Department of the Treasury from 1817 to 1849; he served during the administrations of every president from George Washington to Zachary Taylor and was known as the "watchdog of the Treasury."

== Career ==
Hagner was born in Philadelphia, Pennsylvania on October 1, 1772.

In 1793, Hagner was appointed a clerk in the United States Department of War by President George Washington and appointed an assistant accountant in 1797, and Third Auditor of the United States Treasury by James Monroe when that office was created in 1817. He served under every administration for fifty-six consecutive years, resigning his office in 1849.

Twice by direct votes the U. S. Congress expressed its appreciation of his services in the settlement of large and important claims. This office became at one time so prominent, from the calls made upon its chief by Congress, before the institution of the court of claims, that John Randolph of Roanoke, pausing in debate for a phrase to express his sense of the influence of Nicholas I of Russia in the affairs of Europe, styled him "the great third auditor of nations." Hagner was succeeded by John S. Gallaher.

== Personal life ==
Hagner was married to Frances Randall (1787–1863), a daughter of John Randall, a Revolutionary War veteran who was Collector of the Port of Annapolis and was thrice elected Mayor of Annapolis. Among her many siblings were brothers Alexander Randall, a U.S. Representative and Attorney General of Maryland, and Dr. Richard Randall, the colonial agent of the American Colonization Society in Liberia. Among their eleven children were:

- Eliza Ann Hagner (1807–1870), who married Joseph Hopper Nicholson, son of U.S. Representative Joseph Hopper Nicholson.
- Charles Nicholas Hagner (1809–1849), a Lieut. of the Corps of Topographical Engineers who died at Port Lavaca, Texas.
- John Randall Hagner (1811–1856), of the Army Paymasters' Corp who married Louisa Smith and died at Fort Brown, Texas.
- Frances Randall Hagner (1813–1902), who died unmarried.
- Peter Valentine Hagner (1815–1893), who was an officer of ordnance who served for over 40 years in the United States Army and was brevetted Brigadier General. He married Susan Scott Peyton in 1853.
- Thomas Holmes Hagner (1817–1848), a lawyer, member of the Florida Legislature, and U.S. Minister to the Court of St. James who married Katherine Gamble.
- Mary Margaret Hagner (1818–1911), who married the Rev. Dr. Cleland Kinloch Nelson, the first Bishop of Atlanta and a cousin of Thomas Nelson Page.
- Richard Henry Hagner (1823–1904), a well-known lawyer of Calvert County who married Annie Mary Hungerford.
- Alexander Burton Hagner (1826–1915), an Associate Justice of the Supreme Court of the District of Columbia who married Louisa Harrison, a daughter of Randolph Harrison of Elk Hill in 1853. He had a law practice with his uncle, Alexander Randall.
- Daniel Randall Hagner (1829–1893), a Washington physician.

Hagner died in Washington, D.C., on July 16, 1850.

=== Descendants ===
Through his daughter Eliza, he was a grandfather of Mary Hagner Nicholson (1837–1865), the wife of James Buchanan Henry, a lawyer who was the nephew and ward of James Buchanan, for whom he served as Secretary to the President of the United States.

Through his son Daniel, he was a grandfather of Belle Hagner (1875–1943), who was the first White House Social Secretary, serving in the administrations of President Theodore Roosevelt, William Howard Taft, and Woodrow Wilson.
