= Belle Hagner =

First White House Social Secretary (1875–1943)

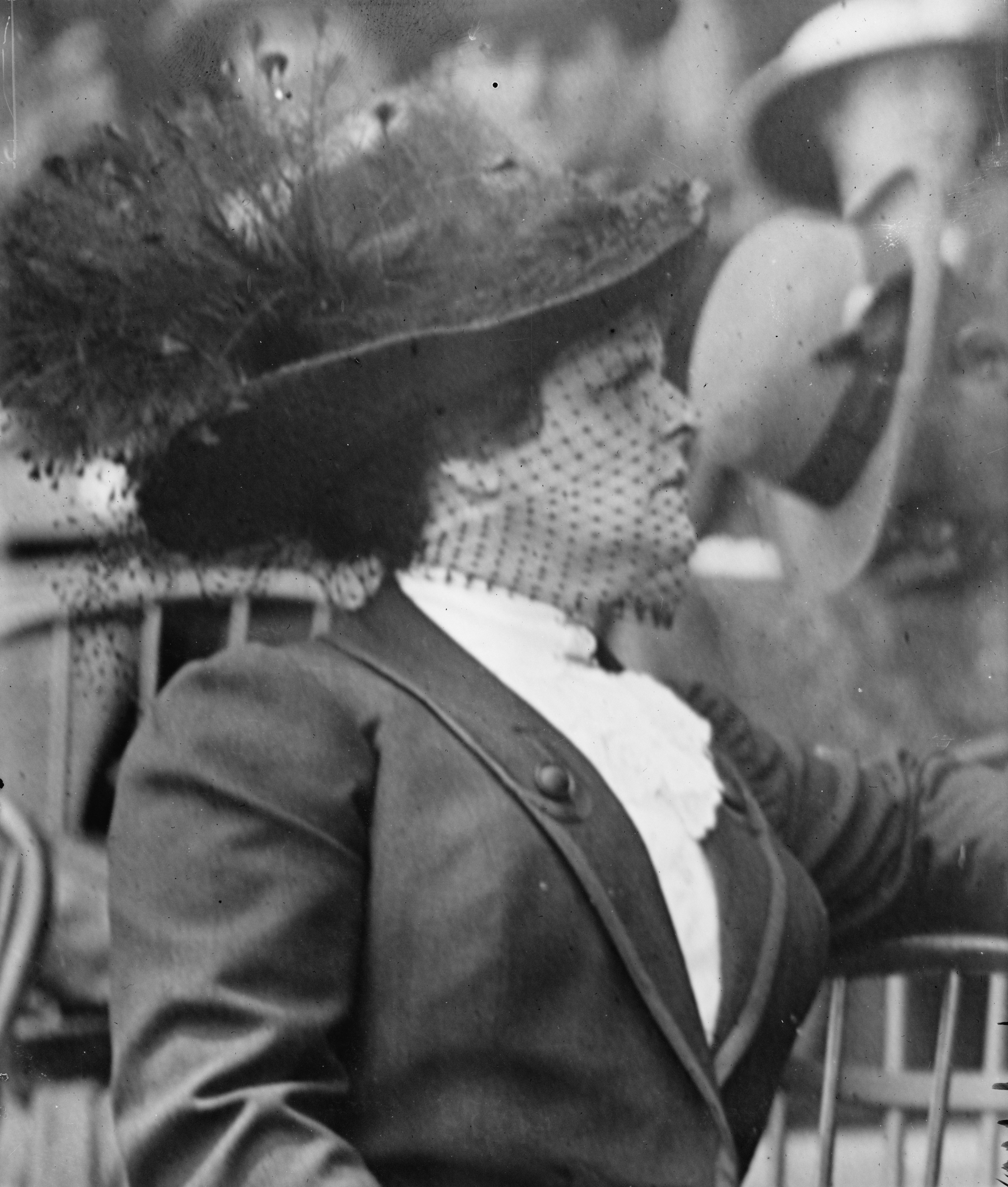
- Hagner in 1915

1st and 4th White House Social Secretary
- In office October 2, 1901 – March 4, 1909
- Appointed by: Edith Roosevelt
- President: Theodore Roosevelt
- Preceded by: Office established
- Succeeded by: Alice Blech
- In office 1913–1915
- President: Woodrow Wilson
- Preceded by: Mary Spiers
- Succeeded by: Edith Benham Helm

Personal details
- Born: Isabella Louisa Hagner; July 23, 1875 Washington, D.C.
- Died: November 1, 1943 (aged 68) Baltimore, Maryland, US

Isabella Louisa Hagner James (July 23, 1875 – November 1, 1943) was the first White House social secretary. She served in the administrations of President Theodore Roosevelt, William Howard Taft, and Woodrow Wilson.

== Early life and career ==
Born in 1875, Hagner spent much of her childhood in the Washington, D.C. neighborhood of Lafayette Square. Hagner’s father, Charles Evelyn Hagner and her mother, Isabella Wynn Davis Hagner both died in 1892, leaving 16 year old Belle responsible for caring for her three younger brothers. Hagner's great-uncle was Alexander Burton Hagner, judge of the United States District Court for the District of Columbia. Hagner was educated by governesses and in private schools.

Hagner began working as a secretary for a variety of women in the District of Columbia, and helped women with the invitations for debutante teas. She was hired by a number of prominent women, and eventually worked for the family of William S. Cowles, the brother-in-law of Theodore Roosevelt.

In 1898, she became a clerk in the office of the surgeon general of the United States, but she regularly took leave to continue as a social secretary for various women, including Ida Saxton McKinley, and the wife of U.S. senator Elihu Root. During that period, Hagner was also the first agent for the Social Register in Washington and secretary for the hostess of U.S. senator Chauncey Depew.

Hagner first met Second Lady-designate Edith Roosevelt in 1901 after the Presidential election of 1900.

== White House role ==
In 1901, First Lady of the United States Edith Roosevelt made an institutional change when she hired Hagner as the first full time White House social secretary to serve a first lady. Hagner's initial assignment was to plan Alice Roosevelt's societal debut in 1902. Edith soon began to rely on Hagner and authorized her to release photos of the first family in hopes of avoiding unauthorized press candids. Hagner was said to have an excellent knowledge of politics that was useful to the family.

Hagner worked in the White House during the duration of the Roosevelt Administration, also served Helen Herron Taft, and was the first appointee of President Woodrow Wilson, serving for a period as the social secretary to Ellen Wilson. Hagner also worked in the Bureau of Trade Relations at the United States Department of State.

During her time working in the federal government, Hagner's brother Randall owned a real estate venture that profited from her social contacts.

== In popular culture ==
Hagner's memoirs are preserved by the White House Historical Association.

The character of Belle Hagner was portrayed by Karen Ziemba in the musical Teddy & Alice (1987).

== Personal life ==
Hagner married Norman James in 1915. Upon their marriage in 1915, James persuaded Hagner to give up her work to become mistress of Overhills, a large estate and grounds located in Catonsville, Maryland. In 1928, Hagner and her husband sold the property and moved to Baltimore.

Hagner died in 1943 and is buried in Loudon Park Cemetery.

Political offices
Preceded by Office established	White House Social Secretary; 1901–1909; 1913–1915	Succeeded by Alice Blech
