= National Intelligencer =

First newspaper in Washington, D.C.

Coordinates: 38°53′34.4″N 77°01′17.2″W

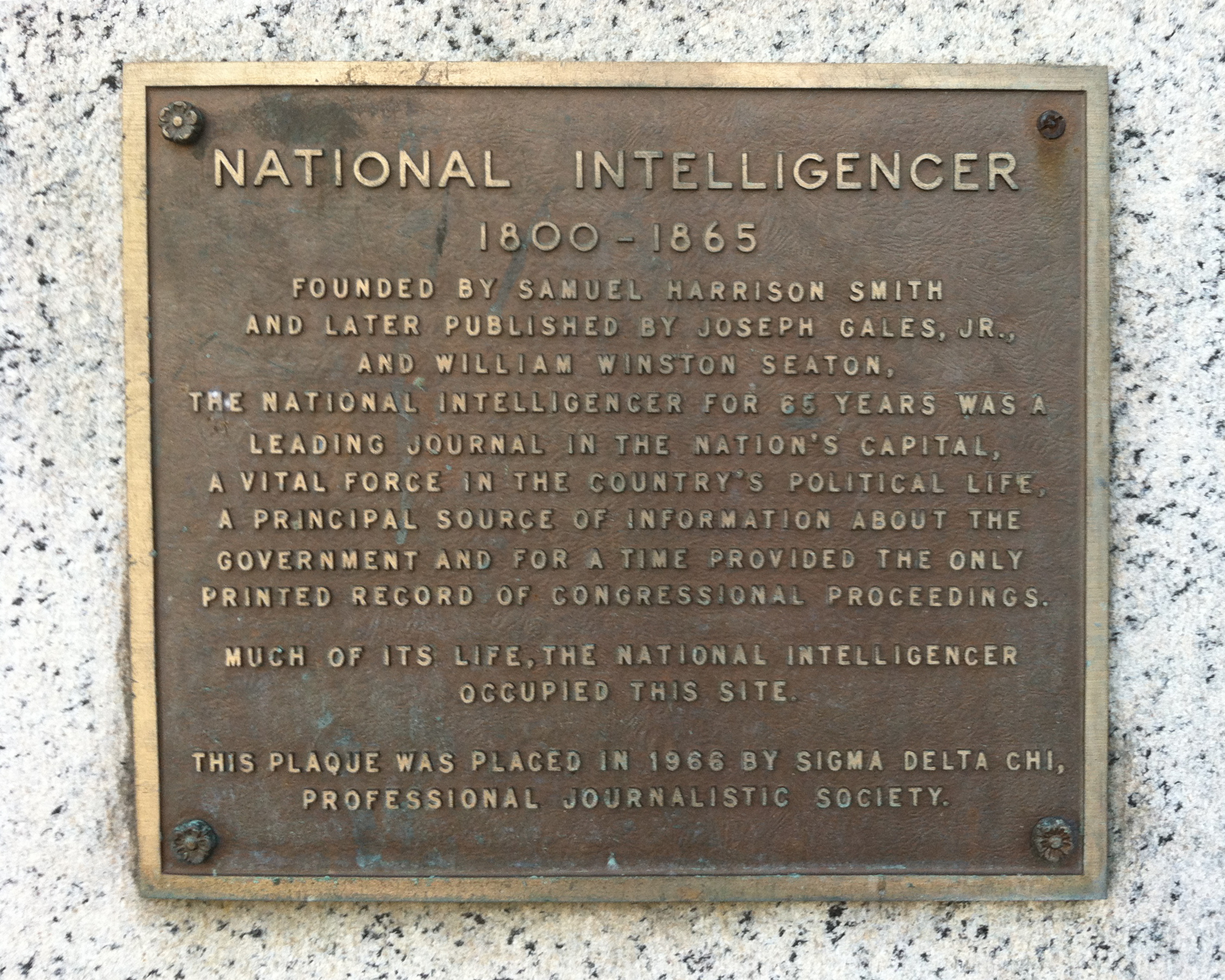
- Plaque at at the southeast corner of Pennsylvania Avenue and 7th Street NW in Washington, D.C., marking the original location of the National Intelligencer
- Type: Thrice Weekly, later Daily newspaper
- Owner: Samuel Harrison Smith
- Publisher: William Winston Seaton and Joseph Gales
- Founded: October 31, 1800
- Ceased publication: January 10, 1870
- Headquarters: Washington, D.C.
- Country: United States
- ISSN: 2474-4336
- OCLC number: 9581153

The National Intelligencer and Washington Advertiser was a newspaper published in Washington, D.C., from October 31, 1800, until 1870. It was the first newspaper published in the District, which was founded in 1790. It was originally a tri-weekly publication. It covered early debates of the United States Congress. The paper was the quasi-official organ of Thomas Jefferson's Democratic-Republican Party, and later of Henry Clay's Whig Party.

== History ==
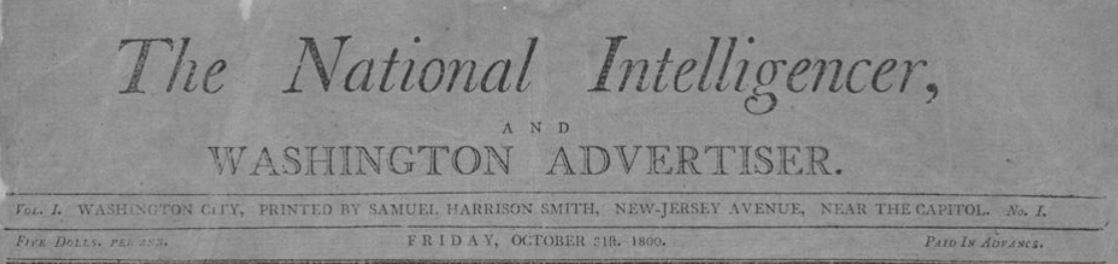
National Intelligencer and Washington Advertiser masthead for October 31, 1800

The publication was founded under the name National intelligencer and Washington Advertiser on October 31, 1800. Its name was changed to the National Intelligencer starting with the issue of November 27, 1810. The newspaper was published daily from 1813 to 1867 as the Daily National Intelligencer and was the dominant newspaper of the capital. During the War of 1812, its offices and printing plant were demolished by British forces as part of the burning of Washington on August 24, 1814. The British commander during the burning, Sir George Cockburn, intentionally targeted the National Intelligencer and stated that "Be sure that all the C's are destroyed, so that the rascals cannot any longer abuse my name."

The paper suspended publication on June 24, 1869. It was renewed on September 20, 1869 as the Daily National Intelligencer and Washington Express and continued publication until January 10, 1870.

== Owners ==
Samuel Harrison Smith, a prominent newspaperman, was an early proprietor. In 1810, Joseph Gales took over as sole proprietor. He and William Winston Seaton were its publishers for more than 50 years.

At first, Gales was the Senate's sole reporter, and Seaton reported on the House of Representatives. The Intelligencer supported the Jefferson, Madison, and Monroe administrations, and Gales and Seaton were selected as the official printers of Congress from 1819 to 1829. In addition to printing government documents, they began compiling their reports of floor debates and publishing them in the Register of Debates, a forerunner of the Congressional Record. Gales and Seaton flourished during the "Era of Good Feelings," a period of relative political complacency, but after Congress was split between the Whigs and Democrats, the partners lost their official patronage. From the 1830s to the 1850s, the National Intelligencer was one of the nation's leading Whig newspapers, and continued to hold conservative, unionist principles down to the Civil War, supporting John Bell and the Constitutional Union Party in the 1860 presidential election. Gales died in 1860 and Seaton retired in 1864.

James Clarke Welling, who became President of Columbian University, served on the editorial staff during the Civil War.

In 1865, the National Intelligencer was taken over by Snow, Coyle & Co. John F. Coyle had been an employee at the paper's offices, and continued to publish the paper despite a half million dollars' worth of debts. On November 30, 1869, the statistician and economist Alexander del Mar bought the paper for cash and merged it with the Washington Express. The short-lived Daily National Intelligencer and Washington Express's last daily publication in Washington was January 10, 1870. Thereafter it was published weekly in New York until at least April 1871. It later became the New York daily City and National Intelligencer with del Mar as editor and publisher, and a circulation of about 2,000 in 1872.

== See also ==
- List of newspapers in Washington, D.C.
