= Peter V. Hagner =

Union Army officer )1815–1893)

Peter Valentine Hagner
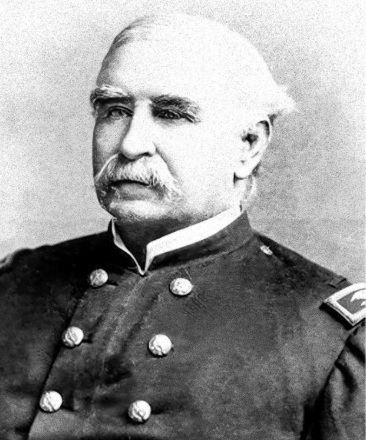
- Born: August 28, 1815; Washington, D.C., U.S.
- Died: March 11, 1893 (aged 77); Washington, D.C.
- Burial place: Oak Hill Cemetery; Washington, D.C., U.S.
- Spouse: Susan S. Peyton
- Relatives: Peter Hagner (father)
- Military career
- Allegiance: United States; Union
- Branch: United States Army; Union Army
- Service years: 1836–1881
- Rank: Colonel; Bvt. Brigadier General
- Unit: Ordnance Department
- Conflicts: Mexican–American War; American Civil War

Peter Valentine Hagner (August 28, 1815 – March 11, 1893) was an officer of ordnance who served for over 40 years in the United States Army and was Brevetted Brigadier General.

== Early life ==
Hagner was the son of government auditor Peter Hagner, and was born in Washington, D.C. After graduating the United States Military Academy at West Point, New York, Hagner was assigned first to artillery, then topographical engineers, and finally ordnance in 1838, in which department service he spent the balance of his career.

== Career ==
At the outset of the Mexican–American War, First Lieutenant Hagner was assigned to the siege battery company, and was brevetted captain and major for "gallant and meritorious conduct" in battles leading to the capture of Mexico City in 1847. In the years before the American Civil War, Hagner commanded several arsenals, responsible for maintenance and upkeep on weaponry and military stores.

Considered a moderate unionist with a reputation of being a level-headed career soldier, the James Buchanan administration selected Hagner to command of the strategic St. Louis Arsenal at the outbreak of the war. The arsenal at the time was sought by both Union and Confederate sympathizers for its valuable contents, and during the early days of the war both legitimate and partisan guerrilla military units from both sides schemed to obtain control.

While in command, Hagner used his authority to restrict Union Army Captain Nathaniel Lyon's access to the arsenal. Lyon was a well connected Republican who sought access to the arsenal for the purpose of arming pro-Union military units to fight against the seceding states. Lyon, enraged that his commander had denied him the arsenal's contents, then wrote of Hagner, making a threat to "pitch him in the river."

After the inauguration of Abraham Lincoln, Lyon began exerting pressure on the War Department through his friend Frank Blair, brother of the incoming Lincoln cabinet officer Montgomery Blair. Lyon sought to have Hagner relieved of the arsenal command and elevate himself as the replacement. Blair subsequently used his War Department connections to fulfill Lyon's request and Hagner's tenure at the arsenal was ended.

By March 1862, Hagner was serving on a commission on ordnance contracts and claims. He served as inspector of factories manufacturing small arms for the government until late 1863, when Hagner was promoted lieutenant colonel and held command of Watervliet Arsenal until war's end. Brevetted brigadier general for service; Hagner was a full Colonel in the ordnance department when he retired from the Army in 1881.

== Personal life ==
Hagner married Susan S. Peyton of Richmond, Virginia, daughter of Bernard Peyton. Hagner was buried at Oak Hill Cemetery in Washington, D.C.

== See also ==
- Missouri secession
