= Anthony Williams =

Anthony or Antony Williams may refer to:

== Government ==
- Anthony Williams (diplomat) (1923–1990), British ambassador to Cambodia, Libya and Argentina
- Anthony Williams (Medal of Honor) (1822–?), American Civil War sailor and Medal of Honor recipient
- Anthony Williams, candidate in the United States House of Representatives elections in Illinois, 2010
- Anthony A. Williams (born 1951), mayor of Washington D.C., 1999–2007
- Anthony D. Williams (politician) (1799–1860), Liberian politician
- Anthony D. Williams Jr. (died 1906), Liberian politician
- Anthony H. Williams (born 1957), Pennsylvania state senator

== Sports ==
- Anthony Ratliff-Williams (born 1997), American football player
- Pooka Williams Jr. (Anthony Williams Jr., born 1998), American football player
- Anthony Williams (Gaelic footballer), Irish sportsman
- Anthony Williams (Welsh footballer) (born 1977), Welsh former goalkeeper

== Others ==
- Anthony Williams (bishop) (1892–1975), Anglican bishop in the Caribbean
- Anthony Williams (comics), Welsh comic book artist
- Anthony Williams (musician) (1931–2021), Trinidadian music pioneer and inventor of the steel pans
- Anthony Williams or Roc Raida (1972–2009), American turntablist and hip hop deejay
- Anthony D. Williams (author) (born 1974), co-author of Wikinomics
- Antony John Williams (born 1960), Welsh chemist, president of ChemSpider
- Anthony Williams (criminal), British criminal known as 'Lord Williams of Tomintoul'
- Anthony Williams-Kenny, British car designer

== See also ==
- Antoni Williams or Toni Williams (1939–2016), New Zealand singer
- Anthony William, self-proclaimed medium who offers pseudoscientific health advice based on alleged communication with a spirit
- Tony Williams (disambiguation)
