= Richard Randall (physician) =

American physician (1796–1829)

Richard Randall (1796 – April 19, 1829) was an American medical doctor who served as colonial agent of the American Colonization Society in Liberia from December 22, 1828, to April 19, 1829.

== Personal life ==
Randall was born in 1796 in Annapolis in Anne Arundel County, Maryland. He was one of fourteen children born to John and Deborah (née Knapp) Randall. His father was a Revolutionary War veteran, born in Westmoreland County, Virginia and later was Collector of the Port of Annapolis and was elected three times as Mayor of Annapolis between 1813 and 1818. Among his siblings was younger brother Alexander Randall, who was a member of the United States House of Representatives from Maryland, and served as Attorney General of Maryland from 1864 to 1868.

His paternal grandparents were Thomas Randall and Jane (née Davis) Randall, the daughter of a plantation owner. His mother, who was born in Cork, Ireland, was the daughter of William Knapp and Frances (née Cudmore) Knapp.

== Career ==
Randall entered the Medical Staff of the U.S. Army in 1818 and was chosen professor of chemistry at Columbian College (today known as George Washington University) in Washington in 1825.

He was Agent in the Colony of Liberia for the American Colonization Society from December 22, 1828, until his death in 1829. He succeeded Colston Waring, and was followed by Dr. Joseph Mechlin, Jr. In 1829, Randall founded the station at Careysburg so named in honor of Lott Cary. Shortly before his death, he was conducting important negotiations with King Boatswain.

== Personal life ==
Randall died of fever in Liberia on April 19, 1829.
