= Tony Williams =

Tony Williams may refer to:

== Music ==
- Tony Williams (drummer) (1945–1997), American jazz drummer
- Tony Williams (English musician) (born 1947), English bassist in Stealers Wheel and Jethro Tull
- Tony Williams (singer) (1928–1992), American lead singer with The Platters
- The Wrldfms Tony Williams, American R&B and soul singer

== Sports ==
- Tony Williams (American football) (born 1975), former American football defensive tackle
- Tony Williams (rugby league) (born 1988), Australian rugby league footballer
- Tony Williams (swimmer) (born 1938), Sri Lankan Olympic swimmer
- Tony Williams (soccer) (born 1976), retired American soccer player
- Tony Williams (basketball) (born 1978), American basketball player
- Tony Williams (born 1943), boat racer and 1981 winner of the Formula 1 Powerboat World Grand Prix

== Others ==
- Tony Williams (author), British poet and author
- Tony Williams (politician) (1928–2012), Australian politician
- Tony Williams (film executive), British film producer
- A. A. B. Williams (1926–2016), known as Tony, South African civil engineer
- Tony Williams (criminal), British criminal known as 'Lord Williams of Tomintoul'

== See also ==
- Toni Williams (1939–2016), New Zealand singer
- Toni-Ann Williams (born 1995), Jamaican-American gymnast
- Anthony Williams (disambiguation)
