= T. Henry Randall =

American architect

- Born: Thomas Henry Randall; July 5, 1862; Annapolis, Maryland, U.S.
- Died: July 5, 1905 (aged 43)
- Education: Johns Hopkins University; Massachusetts Institute of Technology; École des Beaux-Arts
- Occupation: Architect
- Parent(s): Alexander Randall; Elizabeth Philpot Blanchard
- Practice: Henry H. Richardson; McKim, Mead & White; Griffin & Randall
- Buildings: Henry W. Poor House

Thomas Henry Randall (July 5, 1862 – July 7, 1905) was an American architect known for his large country homes during the Gilded Age.

== Early life ==
Randall was born on July 5, 1862, at Annapolis, Maryland. He was one of seven children born to Attorney General of Maryland and U.S. Representative Alexander Randall (1803–1881) and Elizabeth Philpot (née Blanchard) Randall (1827–1895), who married in 1856. From his father's first marriage to Catharine Gamble Wirt, the daughter of U.S. Attorney General William Wirt, he had eight elder half-siblings, only five of whom survived to adulthood. Catharine's mother, Elizabeth Washington Gamble Wirt continued to live with the Randall family after her daughter's death.

His maternal grandfather was the Reverend John Blanchard. His father was the thirteenth of fourteen children born to Annapolis mayor John Randall. Among his large extended family was cousin Alexander Burton Hagner, an Associate Justice of the Supreme Court of the District of Columbia. His father inherited the c. 1717 Bordley House (later known as the Bordley-Randall House or Randall House). The house is located between St. John's College and the Maryland State House on Randall Place and was purchased by his grandfather in 1804. His family owned the home for about 125 years.

After a course of study at Johns Hopkins University in Baltimore, he completed his architectural training at the Massachusetts Institute of Technology, before being a part of the second wave of Americans to attend École des Beaux-Arts in Paris including Louis Sullivan of Chicago and Ernest Flagg of Brooklyn.

== Career ==
The Henry W. Poor House, designed by Randall, in Tuxedo Park, New York, completed in 1899.

Beginning work as draftsman in the Brookline office of Henry H. Richardson, under whom he had charge of the construction of the Washington home of Secretary John Hay and the historian Henry Adams and of the Allegheny County Courthouse in Pittsburgh. After working with Richardson, he was employed by the premier architectural firm of McKim, Mead & White in New York. In 1890, Randall opened his own office in New York, and during his brief career specialized in residential work, noted examples of which were a number of large country estates. The following year in 1891, Randall went into partnership with Percy Griffin (1866-1921), who had also graduated from the Massachusetts Institute of Technology and worked in the office of H. H. Richardson.

In the early 1890s, Griffin & Randall, with Randall as designer, was chosen to design the Baltimore Music Hall. Selection of an architect was made by competition, with the entries judged by Richard Morris Hunt and Griffin & Randall beating out Carrère and Hastings. Randall designed the Hall along the same lines as the Neues Gewandhaus of Leipzig, but his plans for an imposing Baroque circular front never materialized due to a lack of funds. The Hall was built between 1893 and 1894 and opened on October 31, 1894, with a gala concert by the Boston Symphony, directed by Emil Faur.

Griffin & Randall was also chosen by James W. Allison, a successful fertilizer producer, to design his house in Richmond, Virginia. Randall chose the Colonial Revival design, one of the first of that style built in Richmond. In 1895, Griffin and Randall decided to part ways in the middle of the construction of the Allison house. Allison choose Randall to oversee the completion of his house as he was the senior partner and had the most influence over the building's design. Later, Griffin designed the Hotel Caribbee in Montego Bay, Jamaica, in 1896. In the late 1890s he was awarded the commissions for the Jefferson Davis Monument in Richmond and the Colored Orphan Asylum on West 114th Street.

In 1899, construction was completed on the Neoclassical Woodward Hall (named for Henry Williams Woodward, father of banker James T. Woodward) which was designed for the Annapolis campus of St. John's College. The brick building initially housed the college library, biological laboratory, chemical and physical laboratories, and the armory. In 1997, Woodward Hall was rededicated as the Barr-Buchanan Center, housing the Graduate Institute and King William Room. In 1903, construction was completed on Randall's second of two buildings for St. John's. The brick Beaux-Arts building was constructed to house the college dining hall, kitchen, and dormitory rooms. It was originally known as Mess Hall and Senior Hall, but was officially renamed Randall Hall in honor of his brother, John Wirt Randall, in 1912.

Henry Yates Satterlee, the first Bishop of Washington, commissioned Randall to design the temporary baptistry of Washington National Cathedral, today known as The Herb Cottage. Construction began in 1903 and was completed in the spring of 1904, several years before the Cathedral itself began in 1907.

Randall was a member of the New York Chapter of the American Institute of Architects and the Architectural League of New York.

=== Major projects ===
- First National Bank Building in Baltimore, Maryland
- Epiphany Church (alterations) in Washington, D.C.
- Ingleside, the Bernard N. Baker House in Maryland
- Judge William A. Fisher House in Baltimore, Maryland
- William Keyser House in Baltimore, Maryland
- Catonsville Casino (later known as the Catonsville Country Club), Catonsville, Maryland (1894)
- Baltimore Music Hall, Baltimore, Maryland (1894)
- James W. Allison House (today the President's House at Virginia Commonwealth University) in Richmond, Virginia (1896)
- Henry W. Poor House, Tuxedo Park, New York (1899)
- Woodward Hall at St. John's College, Annapolis (1899)
- Christ Church (Reredos), Rochester, New York (1903)
- Randall Hall at St. John's College, Annapolis (1903)
- Baptistry of Washington National Cathedral (today known as The Herb Cottage) on Mount St. Albans St. in Washington, D.C. (1904)
- E.S. Rogers House, Lawrence, New York (1905)

== Personal life ==
In February 1897, Randall attended the Bradley-Martin Ball, a costume ball at the Waldorf Hotel in New York City, in black velvet and jet Elizabethan dress. On May 5, 1900, he was married to Elizabeth Bradhurst, a daughter of Charles Cornell Bradhurst of Newark, at the Church of Transfiguration in Manhattan by the Rev. Dr. George Hendric Houghton. His best man was Newbold Lawrence and the ushers were D. R. Randall, George Cary of Buffalo, Reginald Ronalds (a friend of Stanford White), Raleigh Gildersleeve, Richard R. G. Welling and Henry Ferriday (father of Carolyn Ferriday). It was said "that almost immediately conjugal troubles started" and Elizabeth, a relative of the Goelet and Gerry families, and Henry separated by September 1902.

Randall died on July 7, 1905, and was buried at Saint Anne's Cemetery in Annapolis.
