= Baroness Williams =

Baroness Williams may refer to:

- Shirley Williams, Baroness Williams of Crosby (1930–2021), British politician and academic
- Susan Williams, Baroness Williams of Trafford (born 1967), British Conservative politician

== See also ==
- Lord Williams (disambiguation)
