= Alexander Randall (Maryland politician) =

American politician, Maryland Attorney General (1803-1881)

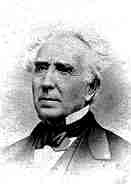

14th Attorney General of Maryland
- In office 1864–1868
- Governor: Augustus Bradford; Thomas Swann
- Preceded by: Robert J. Brent
- Succeeded by: Isaac D. Jones

Member of the U.S. House of Representatives from Maryland's 4th district
- In office March 4, 1841 – March 3, 1843
- Preceded by: James Carroll; Solomon Hillen, Jr.
- Succeeded by: John P. Kennedy

Personal details
- Born: January 3, 1803 Annapolis, Maryland, U.S.
- Died: November 21, 1881 (aged 78) Annapolis, Maryland, U.S.
- Resting place: St. Anne's Cemetery, Annapolis, Maryland, U.S.
- Party: Whig
- Parent: John Randall (father)
- Relatives: Alexander Burton Hagner (nephew)

Alexander Randall (January 3, 1803 – November 21, 1881) was a member of the United States House of Representatives from Maryland, and served as Attorney General of Maryland from 1864 to 1868. He was the thirteenth child of his parents, John and Deborah Knapp Randall. His father was a Revolutionary War veteran, born in Westmoreland County, Virginia and later was Collector of the Port of Annapolis and was elected three times as Mayor of Annapolis between 1813 and 1818.

== Education ==
As a child, Randall attended schoolrooms taught by Miss Sally Ross, Thomas Bassford and Mr. Curran. He graduated with first honor in his class from St. John's College in Annapolis in 1822, teaching during his junior and senior years.

== Career ==
After graduation, Randall thought of teaching but his father quashed the idea, directing him instead to the legal profession. Randall studied law for two years in the law offices of Addison Ridout and was admitted to the bar in 1824, the same year that Lafayette visited Annapolis. Two years later, when his father died, Randall took his place as Collector of the Port of Annapolis until about 1830.

In 1833, John Johnson Jr., son of the elder John Johnson and older brother of Reverdy Johnson, persuaded Randall to consider the post of Auditor of the Court of Chancery, which position Randall held until he resigned in 1840, when he was nominated as Candidate to the 27th Congress on the Whig ticket with John Pendleton Kennedy At the same time, he was made a Trustee of St. John's College and affairs of the College remained a lifelong passion for him.

Randall's nephew and namesake, Alexander Burton Hagner, joined Randall in his law office in 1845 and the two formed a law practice under the name of Randall and Hagner; the partnership lasted for 34 years. In 1868, Randall's son John Wirt Randall joined the firm.

During the Civil War, Randall was firm in his opposition to secession and maintained unwavering loyalty to the Union. Many of his friends and family, however, found themselves needing his help when they were threatened with arrest or forfeiture of property.

Randall was elected Maryland Attorney General in 1864, an office he held until 1867 when Maryland's State Constitution was revised. He was a delegate to the National Republican Convention in Philadelphia in 1872, nominating Ulysses S. Grant as a candidate for President of the United States.

After the Civil War, Randall worked to recover from the government funds for St. John's College for damages done during the use of the grounds and buildings as a hospital during the war years. He also sought to ensure the permanence of the Naval Academy in Annapolis. He formed Gas and Water Companies to provide Annapolis with gas lighting and to replace its brackish well water with pure.

In 1877, Randall, a long-time member of the Board of Directors of Farmers' National Bank, received the unwelcome news that the Bank was over leveraged against properties in Annapolis. The Board elected Randall as President of the Bank; he turned most of his law practice over to his son, John Wirt Randall, and he worked for the remainder of his life to resolve bank matters, straighten out the books and records, maintain public confidence, sell properties and set the bank on a profitable course.

Hagner resigned from Randall & Hagner in 1879 to move to Washington to become an Associate Justice of the Supreme Court of the District of Columbia. The firm subsequently became Randall & Randall when John Wirt Randall took as his partner his brother Daniel.

== Personal ==
After a long courtship, Randall married Catharine Grattan Wirt, the daughter of US Attorney General William Wirt, in 1841. Together they had eight children, five of whom survived to adulthood. Catharine died in 1853, leaving children ranging in ages from 2 1/2 to 9 years old. Catharine's mother, Elizabeth Washington Gamble Wirt, was living with the Randall family at the time and continued to reside with them after her daughter's death.

In 1856, Randall married Elizabeth Philpot Blanchard, the daughter of an old friend of his, the Reverend John Blanchard. Together they had seven children.

Randall was keenly interested in the welfare and promotion of his city of Annapolis. He was an early advocate of public school education and organized in Annapolis the first primary school in the State under the original law of 1825, and served for many years as clerk, trustee or commissioner of these schools.

He was interested in farming, gardening and horticulture and planted trees around Annapolis, an action that was considered at that time to be unhealthful. His son, John Wirt Randall, continued with his father's work and was a Member of the House of Delegates from Anne Arundel County, 1884-85 which introduced and pushed through the legislature the joint resolutions that created Maryland's "Arbor Day" in 1884.

Randall was a devout member and vestryman of St. Anne's Episcopal Church in Annapolis and a member of the Diocese. He attended the General Conventions in Baltimore, New York and Philadelphia as lay delegate. He was a firm adherent to the Temperance Movement and for many years was the President of the State Temperance Society.

He died at his home on November 21, 1881, at age 78 and is buried at St. Anne's Cemetery in Annapolis.

== Children ==
Randall left six sons and six daughters when he died.

From his first marriage to Catharine Grattan Wirt:

- Catherine Wirt Randall, born November 26, 1843
- John Wirt Randall, born March 6, 1845
- Ellen Rosa Randall, born September 22, 1846
- Fanny Nicholson Randall, born March 19, 1848
- Agnes Wirt Randall, born August 20, 1850

From his second marriage to Elizabeth Philpot Blanchard:

- Blanchard Randall, born November 12, 1856
- Burton Alexander Randall, born September 21, 1858
- Elizabeth Blanchard Randall, born August 21, 1860
- Thomas Henry Randall, born July 5, 1862
- Daniel Richard Randall, born December 25, 1864
- Wyatt William Randall, born January 10, 1867
- Adeline Blanchard Randall, born February 13, 1869

U.S. House of Representatives
Preceded by James Carroll and Solomon Hillen, Jr.	Member of the U.S. House of Representatives from Maryland's 4th congressional district 1841–1843	Succeeded by John P. Kennedy
Legal offices
Preceded by Robert J. Brent	Attorney General of Maryland; 1864–1868	Succeeded by Isaac Dashiell Jones
