= Agents and governors of Liberia =

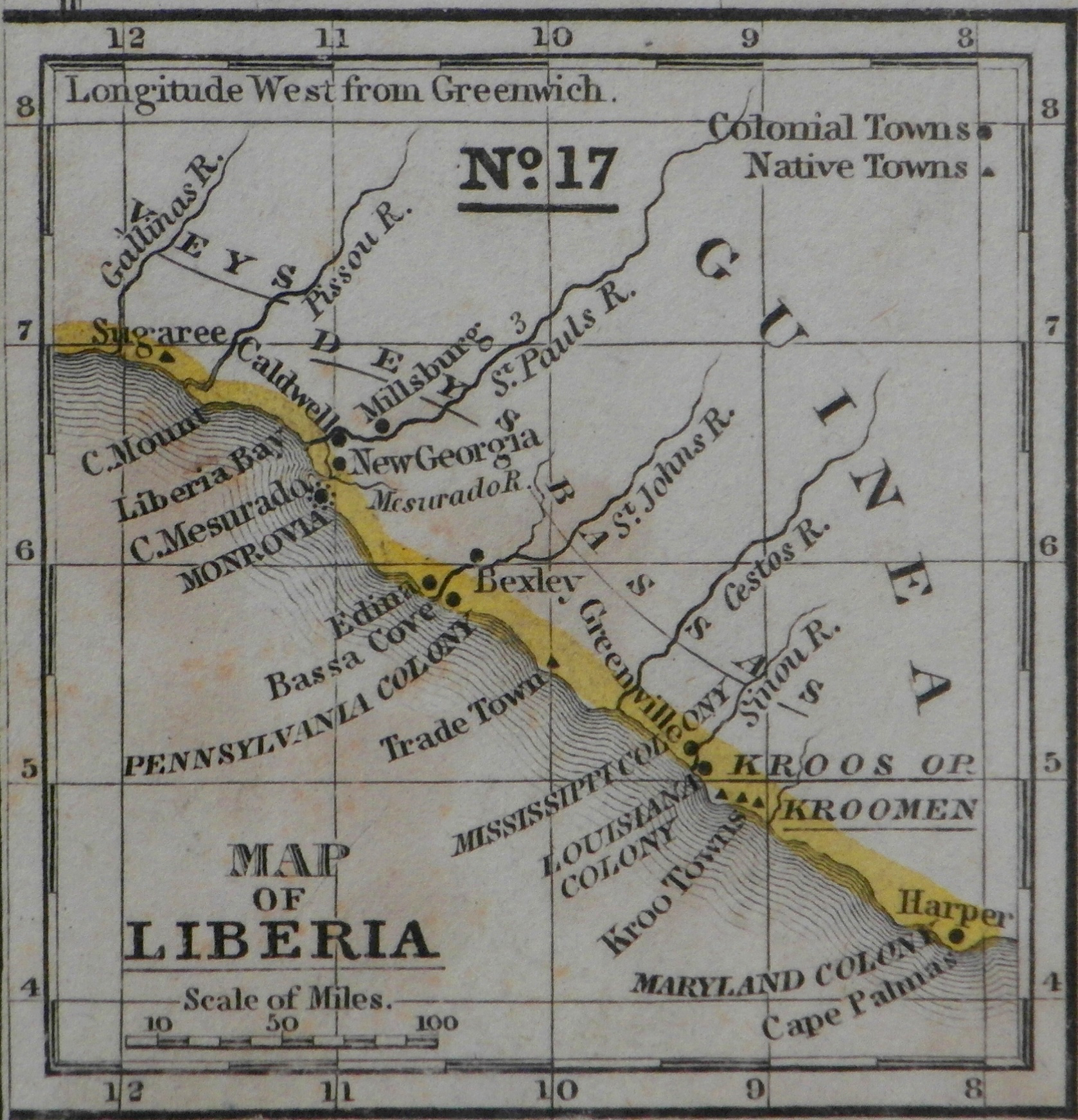
Map of the Colony of Liberia, 1839.

This article lists the agents and governors of Liberia, consisting of fourteen agents and two governors of the American Colonization Society from 1822 until Liberian independence in 1847. The last governor, Joseph Jenkins Roberts, also served as the first president of Liberia after independence was gained in 1847.

The colors indicate the race of each agent or governor.

== List of agents and governors of Liberia ==
Status

Denotes Acting Colonial Agent

Symbols

^{†} Died in office

No.	Portrait	Name (Birth–Death)	Term of office			Race	Title
No.	Portrait	Name (Birth–Death)	Took office	Left office	Time in office	Race	Title
Cape Mesurado Colony
1		Eli Ayers (1778–1822)	December 15, 1821	April 25, 1822^{[†]}	131 days	White	Colonial Agent
2		Frederick James; Acting Colonial Agent	April 25, 1822	June 4, 1822	40 days	Black	Colonial Agent
3		Elijah Johnson (1789–1849); Acting Colonial Agent	June 4, 1822	August 8, 1822	65 days	Black	Colonial Agent
4		Jehudi Ashmun (1794–1828); Acting Colonial Agent	August 8, 1822	April 2, 1823	237 days	White	Colonial Agent
(3)		Elijah Johnson (1789–1849); Acting Colonial Agent	April 2, 1823	August 14, 1823	134 days	Black	Colonial Agent
(4)		Jehudi Ashmun (1794–1828); Acting Colonial Agent	August 14, 1823	August 15, 1824	1 year, 1 day	White	Colonial Agent
Colony of Liberia
(4)		Jehudi Ashmun (1794–1828)	August 15, 1824	March 26, 1828	3 years, 224 days	White	Colonial Agent
5		Lott Cary (vice-agent) (1780–1828)	March 26, 1828	November 8, 1828	227 days	Black	Colonial Agent
6		Colston Waring (vice-agent)	November 8, 1828	December 22, 1828	44 days	Black	Colonial Agent
7		Richard Randall (1796–1829)	December 22, 1828	April 19, 1829^{[†]}	118 days	White	Colonial Agent
8		Joseph Mechlin Jr. (unknown–1839)	April 19, 1829	February 27, 1830	314 days	White	Colonial Agent
9		John Anderson	February 27, 1830	April 12, 1830	44 days	White	Colonial Agent
10		Anthony D. Williams (vice-agent) (1799–1860)	April 13, 1830	December 4, 1830	235 days	Black	Colonial Agent
(8)		Joseph Mechlin Jr. (unknown–1839)	December 4, 1830	September 24, 1833	2 years, 293 days	White	Colonial Agent
11		George McGill (vice-agent)	September 24, 1833	January 1, 1834	99 days	Black	Colonial Agent
12		John B. Pinney (1806–1882)	January 1, 1834	April 26, 1835	1 year, 116 days	White	Colonial Agent
13		Nathaniel Brander (vice-agent) (1796–unknown)	April 26, 1835	August 12, 1835	110 days	Black	Colonial Agent
14		Ezekiel Skinner (1777–1885)	August 12, 1835	September 25, 1836	1 year, 63 days	White	Colonial Agent
(10)		Anthony D. Williams (vice-agent then lieutenant governor) (1799–1860)	September 25, 1836	April 1, 1839	2 years, 189 days	Black	Colonial Agent
Commonwealth of Liberia
1		Thomas Buchanan (1808–1841)	April 1, 1839	September 3, 1841^{[†]}	2 years, 154 days	White	Governor
2		Joseph Jenkins Roberts^{[A]} (1809–1876)	September 3, 1841	January 3, 1848	6 years, 121 days	Black	Governor

^{[A]} Became the first president of Liberia in January 1848

== See also ==
- Americo-Liberians
- History of Liberia
- Mississippi-in-Africa
- Republic of Maryland (Maryland-in-Africa)
