= 1899 Liberian general election =

- 1899
- Presidential election
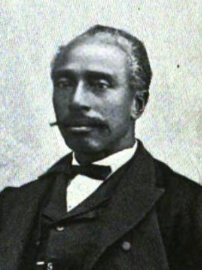

Nominee	William D. Coleman	Anthony D. Williams Jr.
Party	TWP	National Union
Running mate	Joseph J. Ross
President before election
William D. Coleman
TWP
Elected President
William D. Coleman
TWP

General elections were held in Liberia in May 1899. In the presidential election, incumbent William D. Coleman of the True Whig Party was re-elected for a second full term. His first, partial term was spent completing the term of President Joseph James Cheeseman who had died in office. Coleman defeated Anthony D. Williams Jr. of the National Union.

Initially, the True Whig Party nominated F. E. R. Johnson for the vice presidency, but he declined. Incumbent Vice President Joseph J. Ross was ultimately endorsed by both major parties for the position.
