= Anthony D. Williams (politician) =

Americo-Liberian politician (1799–1860)

Anthony David Williams Sr. (1799 – 1860) was an Americo-Liberian politician who served as the second vice president of Liberia from 1850 to 1854 under President Joseph Jenkins Roberts. Born free in the United States in 1799, he immigrated as a Methodist preacher from Petersburg, Virginia to Liberia in 1823. Williams served as the Colonial Agent for the American Colonization Society from 1837 to 1839. During his tenure, the colony of Mississippi-in-Africa was established. In the 1849 elections, Williams ran for vice president against incumbent Nathaniel Brander. The failure of any candidate to secure a majority of the vote led the race to be thrown to the House of Representatives, which chose Williams as vice president. He died in 1860.

His son, Anthony D. Williams Jr., served as Secretary of War and Navy, and later unsuccessfully ran for president in 1891 and 1893 as the candidate for the New Republican Party and again in 1899 as the candidate of the National Union Party.

Political offices
Preceded by Nathaniel Brander	Vice President of Liberia; 1850–1854	Succeeded by Stephen Allen Benson
