= Anthony D. Williams Jr. =

Liberian politician

Anthony D. Williams Jr. (died 1906) was a Liberian politician and militiaman.

== Biography ==
Anthony D. Williams Jr. was the son of Anthony D. Williams Sr., who had served as acting colonial agent and vice president.

Williams served as a militia colonel. Williams was the presidential nominee for the opposition New Republican Party in the 1891 election. He lost to True Whig Party (TWP) nominee Joseph James Cheeseman. He ran with the New Republicans again in the 1893 election, but was defeated again by incumbent President Cheeseman.

In his first term, President William D. Coleman appointed Williams as Secretary of War and Navy. Williams ran for president once more in the 1899 election, with the newly formed National Union Party. He was defeated by incumbent President Coleman of the TWP.

Williams died in 1906.
