= John Randall (Annapolis mayor) =

American mayor (1750–1826)

Mayor of Annapolis, Maryland
- In office 1817–1818
- Preceded by: Nicholas Brewer
- Succeeded by: Nicholas Brewer
- In office 1815–1816
- Preceded by: Nicholas Brewer
- Succeeded by: Nicholas Brewer
- In office 1813–1814
- Preceded by: Nicholas Brewer
- Succeeded by: Nicholas Brewer

Personal details
- Born: 1750; Westmoreland County, Virginia
- Died: June 12, 1826 (aged 75–76)
- Spouse: Deborah Knapp (m. 1783)
- Relations: T. Henry Randall (grandson); Peter V. Hagner (grandson); Alexander Burton Hagner (grandson)
- Children: 14, including Alexander, Richard
- Parent(s): Thomas Randall; Jane Davis Randall

Military service
- Allegiance: United States
- Branch/service: Continental Army
- Rank: Colonel
- Battles/wars: Revolutionary War

John Randall (1750 – June 12, 1826) was an architect, American Revolutionary War soldier and officer, and was an early 19th-century mayor of Annapolis, Anne Arundel County, Maryland. He was also the Collector of the Port of Annapolis, which included responsibility for fortifying the harbor.

== Early life ==
John Randall was born in 1750 in Westmoreland County, Virginia, now Richmond County, Virginia, to Thomas Randall and Jane (née Davis) Randall, daughter of a plantation owner. He was the youngest son of 14 children born to his parents. His father came to the colonies in the early 18th century and settled in what was then Westmoreland County, Virginia. Thomas was a large landowner, planter, Justice of the Peace for the Northern Neck of Virginia, and vestryman of North Farnham Parish.

Randall was educated by William Buckland in Fredericksburg, Virginia, in the 1760s. Buckland was a reputed architect and builder who "designed some of the most celebrated many of the most celebrated colonial residences and public buildings in Virginia and Maryland." (Note: Warfield's "The Founders of Anne Arundel" book incorrectly spelled the architects name as Buckley, it's William Buckland)

== Career ==
Randall owned a flour mill in Annapolis, Anne Arundel County, Maryland, and owned a schooner, trading between Annapolis & Baltimore. John's eldest son, John, was a partner with him in Randall & Sons.

Beginning in 1770 Randall worked as an architect in Annapolis and designed and constructed several notable colonial buildings. One of the houses Randall worked on was the Hammond-Harwood House. The lead architect for the house was William Buckland, Randall's teacher. He also worked with Buckland on Edward Lloyd IV's House beginning in 1772 and the Maryland State House.

After Randall's friend, James Monroe, became president (1817–1825), Monroe may have visited Randall's Middleton Tavern. The tavern, first opened in 1750 by Horatio Middleton, was known to be frequented by Benjamin Franklin, George Washington, Thomas Jefferson and other notable men from the Continental Congress.

=== Military service ===
Regarding events leading up to the American Revolution, Randall signed protests against the British act of closing the port of Boston and refused to pay the British government and its subjects for debts due by the colonists.

It was said of Randall:

He was an earnest upholder of the rights of the colonies in the years preceding the Revolution, but earnestly protested against the repudiation of debts due to the inhabitants of Great Britain, as by published signed protest of that day appear.

Randall served in the United States Army during the American Revolution. He was appointed by the Governor and Council of Maryland to be Commissary to the Maryland troops and then became an officer of the Maryland Line. Between 1778 and 1779 he became the State Clothier, Quartermaster, and Ensign in the 4th Maryland Regiment. He was then made colonel. (Note: The record for John Randall in the Sons of the American Revolution records do not mention that he made colonel during the Revolutionary War.)

After the war and until his death in 1826, Randall was the Collector of the Port of Annapolis. He was appointed for the position by President George Washington. One of his duties, starting in 1794, was to create a fort for Annapolis. This resulted in the circular Fort Severn on Windmill Point and Fort Madison on the north side of the Severn, built to guard the port of Annapolis.

=== Mayor of Annapolis ===
Randall was elected mayor of Annapolis three times: 1813–1814, 1815–1816, and 1817–1818. He alternated his mayoral position with Nicholas Brewer from 1813 to 1819. In recognition for Randall's service as alderman, mayor and council member, it is believed that Randall Street in Annapolis was named for him.

== Personal life ==
On January 7, 1783, John was married to Deborah Knapp in Anne Arundel County, Maryland. Deborah, who had been born on May 3, 1763, in Cork, Ireland, was the daughter of William Knapp and Frances (née Cudmore) Knapp. They had fourteen children: Elizabeth Hamilton "Eliza," Frances (wife of Peter Hagner), John, Daniel, Thomas, Henry Knapp, Richard, Anne, Henrietta Sanford, Alexander, and Burton. (Note: William, James, and Francis K were not listed in the Maryland State Archives biography for John Randall. Editor Clayton Colman Hall's biography of Randall states that 11 of the Randalls 15 children "reached the age of majority.") Daniel and Henry had noteworthy military and political careers. Alexander was a successful attorney, member of U.S. Congress and member of the Maryland Continental Congress. Burton was a physician and appointed United States Army Assistant Surgeon. Thomas had a noteworthy legal and military career; he was an attorney, judge, and United States Special Agent. Richard was a successful physician, founder of the American Colonization Society and Governor to Liberia.

Randall died on June 12, 1826. His wife Deborah died on December 18, 1852, in Annapolis, Maryland. They were buried in St Anne's Cemetery in Annapolis.

=== Residence ===
In 1804 Randall purchased the Bordley House, then after known as the Bordley-Randall House or Randall House. The house is located between St. John's College and the Maryland State House on Randall Place. After his death, son Alexander inherited the house and his descendants owned the home for about 125 years.

== Bibliography ==
- Robert Harry McIntire (1979). Annapolis Maryland Families. Baltimore: Gateway Press, Baltimore.
- Harry Wright Newman (1938 reprint). Maryland Revolutionary Records Index. Genealogical Publishing Company.
- Henry C Peden (2009 reprint). Revolutionary Patriots of Anne Arundel County. Heritage Books. ISBN 1585492043.
- William Hand Browne, Editor. (1901) Revolutionary War Records: Journal and Correspondence of the State Council March 20, 1777 - March 28, 1778. Baltimore: Maryland Historical Society. Repository: Archives of Maryland.
