= Lord Williams =

Lord Williams may refer to:

- John Williams, 1st Baron Williams of Thame (1500–1559), English Tudor courtier
- Tom Williams, Baron Williams of Barnburgh (1888–1967), British Labour politician
- Thomas Williams, 1st Baron Williams (1892–1966), British peer
- Francis Williams, Baron Francis-Williams (1903–1970), British newspaper editor
- Charles Williams, Baron Williams of Elvel (1933–2019), British Labour politician
- Gareth Williams, Baron Williams of Mostyn (1941–2003), Welsh barrister and Labour cabinet minister
- Michael Williams, Baron Williams of Baglan (1949–2017), British diplomat for the United Nations
- Rowan Williams, Baron Williams of Oystermouth (born 1950), former Archbishop of Canterbury
- Lord Williams of Tomintoul, real name Anthony Williams, British criminal

Lady Williams may refer to:

- Jane Williams, Baroness Williams of Elvel (1929–2023), English secretary
- Jane Williams, Lady Williams of Oystermouth (born 1957), English Anglican theologian and writer
- Shirley Williams, Baroness Williams of Crosby (1930–2021), British politician and academic
- Susan Williams, Baroness Williams of Trafford (born 1967), British Conservative politician

== See also ==
- Marcia Williams, Baroness Falkender (1932–2019), private secretary to Harold Wilson
- David Williamson, Baron Williamson of Horton (1934–2015), British and European civil servant
