= Jehudi Ashmun =

Religious leader and social reformer (1794–1828)

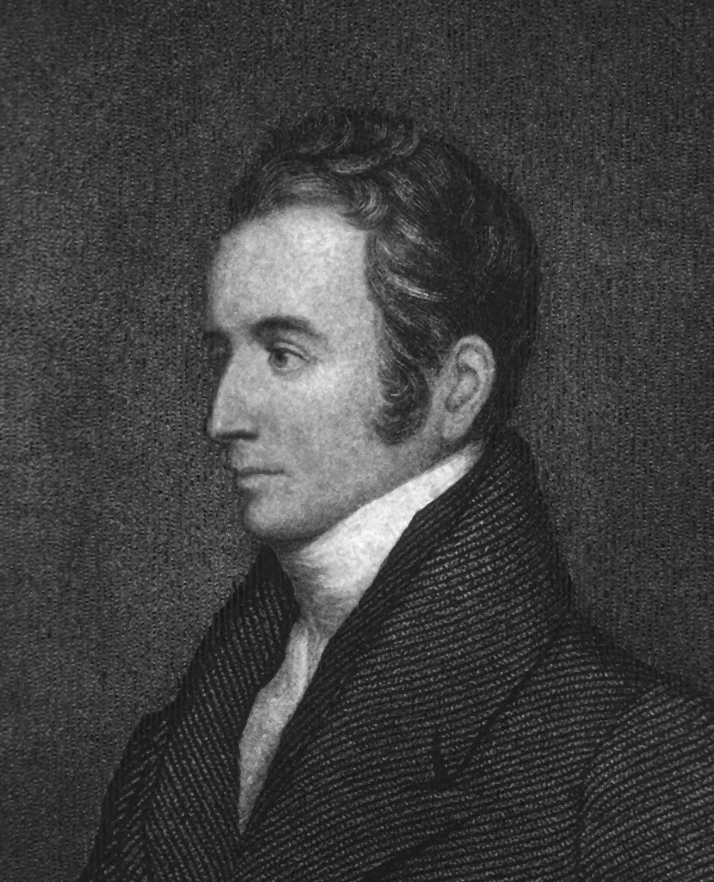
- Portrait ca. 1825

4th and 6th Colonial Agent of Liberia
- In office 8 August 1822 – 2 April 1824
- Preceded by: Elijah Johnson
- Succeeded by: Elijah Johnson
- In office 14 August 1824 – 26 March 1828
- Preceded by: Elijah Johnson
- Succeeded by: Lott Cary

Personal details
- Born: 21 April 1794 Champlain, New York, U.S.
- Died: 25 August 1828 (aged 34) New Haven, Connecticut, U.S.

Jehudi Ashmun (April 21, 1794 – August 25, 1828) was an American religious leader and social reformer from New England who helped lead efforts by the American Colonization Society to "repatriate" African Americans to a colony in West Africa. It founded the colony of Liberia in West Africa as a place to resettle free people of color from the United States.

Ashmun emigrated to Monrovia, Liberia in 1822, where he served as the United States government's agent (de facto governor) for two different terms: one from August 1822 until April 1824, and another from August 1824 until March 1828. His wife died there. Suffering ill health, he returned to the United States and died later that year.

== Early life and education ==
Born in Champlain, New York, in 1794, Ashmun first studied at Middlebury College in Vermont. During his senior year, he studied at the University of Vermont. After graduation, he was ordained in Maine as a minister.

== Marriage and family ==
Ashmun married in 1818 and his wife accompanied him to Bangor, Maine, where he took his first position.

== Career ==
Ashmun was appointed as the first principal, and one of the first two professors, of the Bangor Theological Seminary in Bangor, Maine. He retained this professorship until 1827, despite leaving the country for a few years while living and working in the new colony of Monrovia, Liberia.

Drawn by other opportunities, Ashmun returned to the United States, settling in Washington, DC, where he worked as the editor of an Episcopalian monthly. Interested in the work of the American Colonization Society (ACS), he founded the newspaper The African Intelligencer and wrote about their mission.

His articles about the ACS, which was committed to "repatriating" free blacks to a newly founded colony in West Africa, led to Ashmun's political appointment as representative of the U.S. government to the colony. While the project was privately funded, it was chartered by Congress. At the age of 26, Ashmun was the leader in 1822 of a group of settlers and missionaries to Liberia on the ship Elizabeth. His wife went with him but was among the many settlers who died of malaria and other tropical diseases in the new settlement.

As United States representative to Liberia as well as agent of the ACS, Ashmun served as governor of the colony for two periods of time, from 1822 to 1828, from ages 28 to 34. He took a leadership role in what he found to be a demoralized colony. He helped build the defenses of Monrovia against attacks by indigenous tribes, as well as against slave raiders, organizing the settlement's successful defense against a much larger native force in November 1822. He also worked to develop the colony's trade with the US, Great Britain, and Europe. During his tenure in Liberia, Ashmun increased agricultural production, annexed more lands from neighboring tribes, and exploited commercial opportunities in the interior.

He helped create a constitution for Liberia that enabled African Americans to hold positions in the government. African Americans and their descendants, known as Americo-Liberians, dominated the government into the late 20th century.

By contrast, in the early decades of the neighboring British colony of Sierra Leone, the government was dominated by whites. Freetown was originally founded for the resettlement of free blacks from Britain and Upper Canada (many of them were Black Loyalists and their descendants: freed African-American slaves who had joined the British for freedom during the American Revolutionary War).

Ashmun wrote numerous letters to ACS officials, family and friends in the United States. These and his book, History of the American Colony in Liberia, 1821–1823 (1826), constitute the earliest written history of the Liberia colony.

== Death ==
Suffering ill health in Liberia, Ashmun returned to the United States in 1828. He died in New Haven, Connecticut, soon after. He was interred there in Grove Street Cemetery.

== Legacy and honors ==
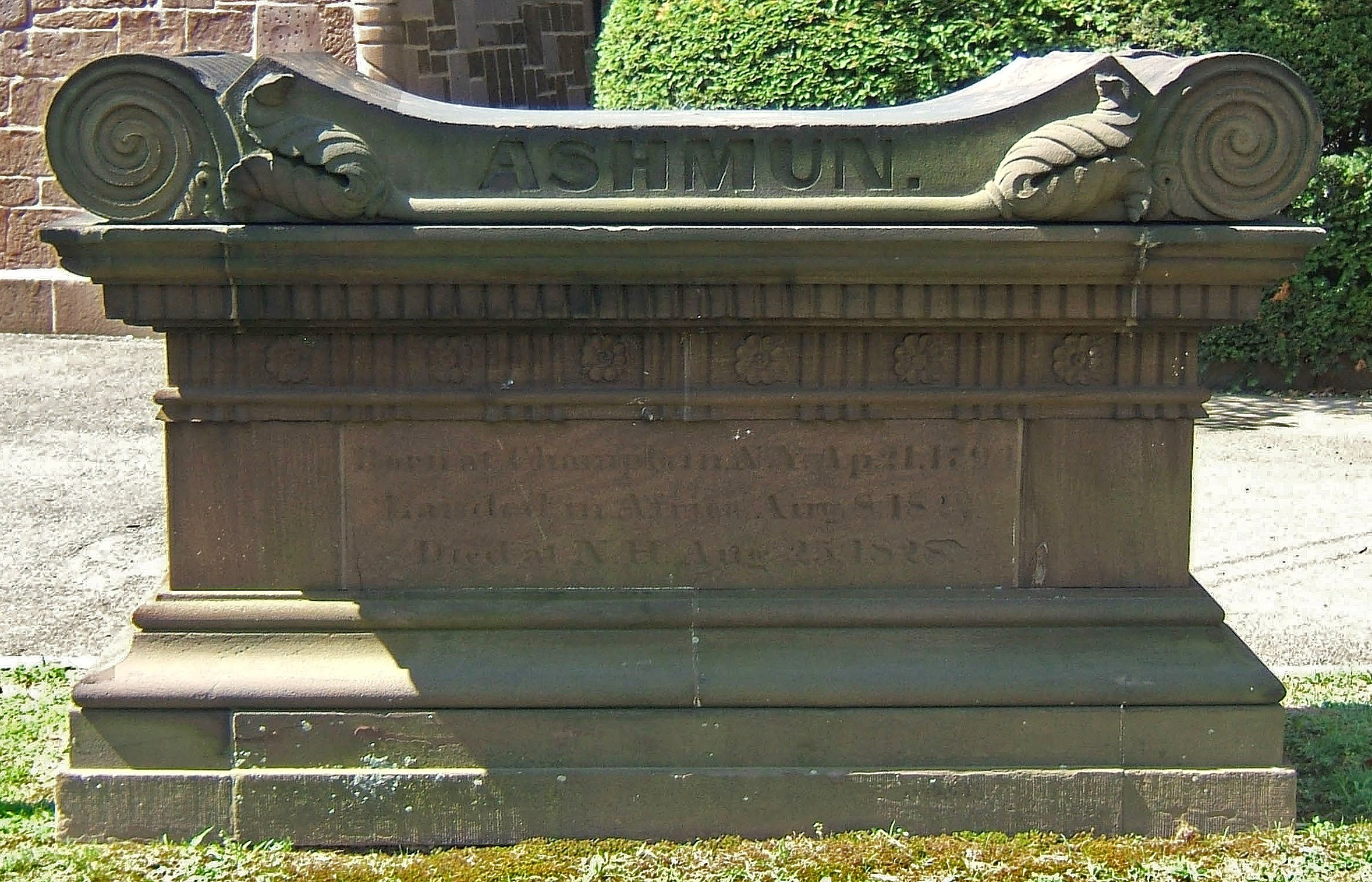
Monument at Jehudi Ashmun's grave in New Haven, Connecticut

Nearly a century after his death, a British history of Liberia called Ashmun "one of the most remarkable men who have ever given their lives in the service of Africa and the African."

Lincoln University, a historically black college in Pennsylvania, was originally chartered in 1854 as Ashmun Institute in his honor.
