= Ezekiel Skinner =

Colonial agent of the American Colonization Society in Liberia

Ezekiel Skinner (1777–1855) was a colonial agent of the American Colonization Society in Liberia from August 12, 1835, until September 25, 1836.

== See also ==
- John B. Pinney, agent 1834–1835
