= John B. Pinney =

John B. Pinney (1806 – 1882) was an American medical doctor who served as colonial agent of the American Colonization Society in Liberia from January 1, 1834, to April 26, 1835. An avowed member of the Temperance Movement in the United States, he sought to promote the idea in Liberia, leading to tension between rural and urban interests in Monrovia and the surrounding area. This eventually led to his resignation and return to the United States in April 1835. Vice-agent Nathaniel Brander, a Liberian colonist, took over his duties as agent.

== See also ==
- Ezekiel Skinner, agent 1835–1836
