= Elijah Johnson (agent) =

American colonial agent (c.1789–1849)

Elijah Johnson (c. 1789^{[A]} – April 3, 1849) was an African American who was one of the first colonial agents of the American Colonization Society in what later became Liberia. He was probably born in New Jersey and received some limited schooling in New Jersey and New York. He served as a soldier in the War of 1812 and studied for the Methodist ministry. In 1835 he led a company of 120 armed volunteers from Monrovia on a punitive expedition to engage King Joe as a result of the Port Cresson massacre. His son Hilary R. W. Johnson was elected in 1884 as President of Liberia, the first to have been born in the country.

== Early life and children ==
Elijah Johnson was of mixed-race ancestry and was born about 1790 probably in New York. He had two children out of wedlock, Lewis Johnson (1810 – 1838) and Charles Johnson (born 1812). He later married and had one daughter, Elizabeth (born 1818), with his wife Mary Johnson. After immigrating to the colony of Liberia in 1820, his wife died of fever or malaria. He married again and had several children with his second wife, Rachel Wright. Two of his children, Sarah (b. about 1811), and Elijah Johnson, Junior (born about 1812), were left in an orphanage in Chester County, Pennsylvania in 1816. Their mother was not identified, but their father was recorded as Elijah Johnson. He is known to have moved to Pennsylvania from New York, prior to the War of 1812, in which he served. After the War, he studied at a Methodist school and was ordained as a minister of the Methodist church in northern New York.

== Immigration to Liberia ==
Elijah Johnson was a member of the American Colonization Society, as was his friend Jehudi Ashmun. They traveled to Liberia on the Elizabeth in 1820 along with their wives and children. On March 9, 1820, they landed on Sherbro Island in what is today Sierra Leone. The early settlers had difficulty with the frontier conditions. Many died of malaria and yellow fever, including Johnson's wife Mary. In 1821, the surviving settlers moved to Providence Island near what is today Monrovia. There, Johnson married Rachel Wright (born ca. 1798), another American immigrant, with whom he had several children. They included Hilary R. W. Johnson, who was elected the eleventh President of Liberia.

Johnson became the acting colonial agent of the American Colonization Society after the deaths of Eli Ayers, the white first agent, and his black successor Frederick James. He served in this role from June 4, 1822, until August 8, 1822; and again from April 2, 1823, until August 14, 1823. He was replaced by Jehudi Ashmun.

Johnson was appointed as Commissary of Stores and became active in politics. In 1847, he was one of the signers of the Liberian Declaration of Independence. He was elected as President Pro Tempore of the Senate of Liberia in 1848. He died in 1849 in White Plains, a missionary station in the interior of Liberia.

== Notes ==
^{[A]} According to the ship records and the 1843 census of Liberia. Other sources cite as a birth date ca 1780.

- Wills, Anita L., (2009) Pieces of the Quilt: The Mosaic of An African American Family; Wills: CA
