= Robert L. White (collector) =

American collector (~1949–2003)

Robert L. White (c. 1949 – October 11, 2003) was a collector of Kennedyiana and other presidential memorabilia. Many of his John F. Kennedy relics were acquired from Kennedy's secretary Evelyn Lincoln. White also collected skulls and scalps, and had a business card that read "Robert L. White, Baltimore's #1 Head Hunter". He had about 40 in his collection at the time of his death, including the skull of William Wirt.
