= Cephas Thompson =

American painter (1775–1856)

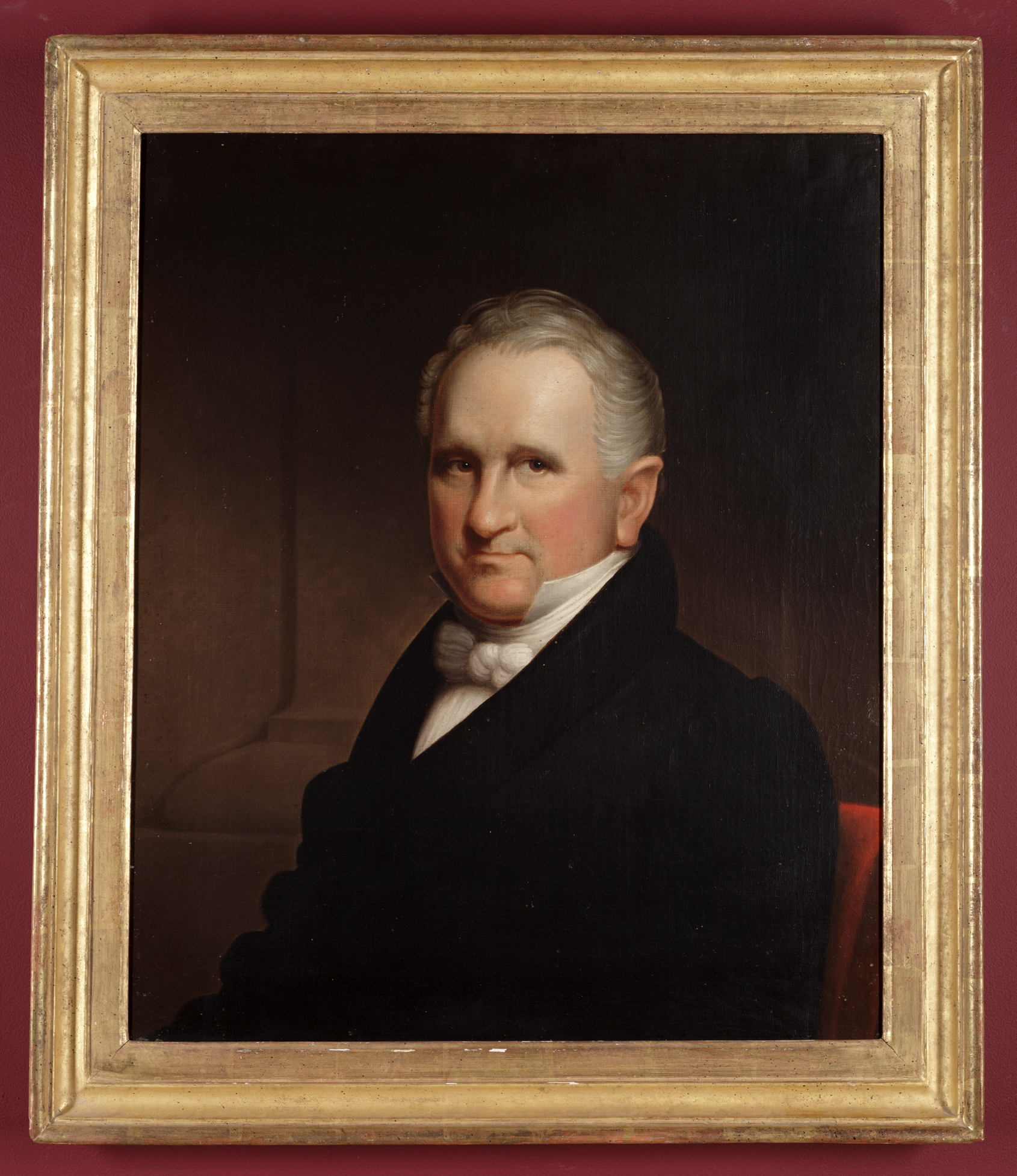
- self-portrait, 1830
- Born: July 1, 1775
- Died: November 6, 1856
- Spouse: Olivia Leonard Thompson

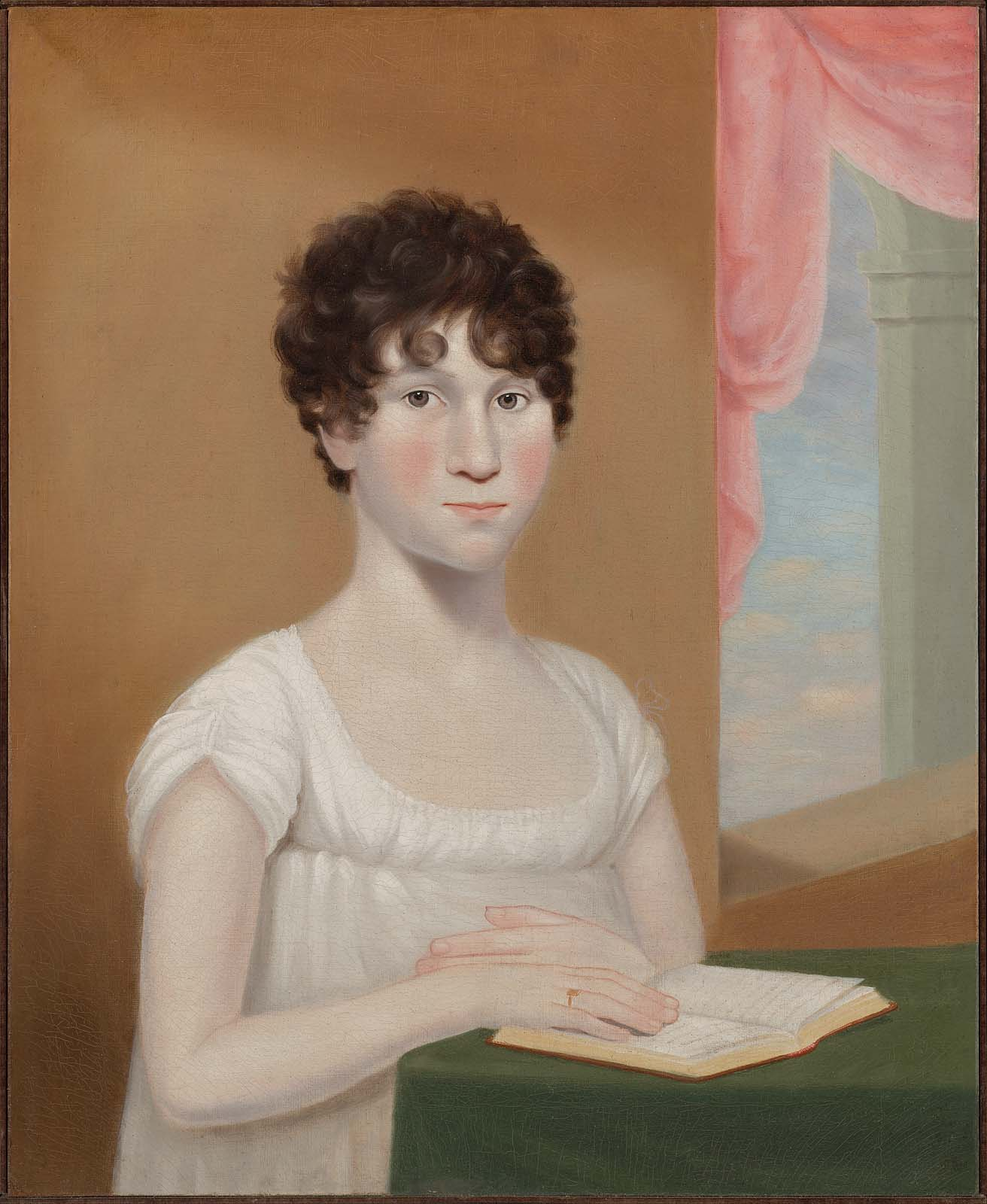
Maria De Wolf (Mrs. Robert Rogers), c. 1805, oil on canvas, in the collection of the Museum of Fine Arts, Boston

Cephas Thompson (July 1, 1775 – November 6, 1856) was an American painter. He was born, died, and lived most of his life in Middleborough, Massachusetts, but traveled extensively down the Atlantic coast and lived far from home for months at a time while pursuing his career as a portraitist.

Thompson married Olive Leonard on March 18, 1802 (his full-length portrait of her survives in the Metropolitan Museum of Art). Their son, Cephas Giovanni Thompson, became a painter of portraits and landscape in his own right, and a friend of the author Nathaniel Hawthorne. Cephas and Olive's daughter Florantha married missionary Granville Sproat and, after spending time teaching at La Pointe, Wisconsin, moved to California during the gold rush. Florantha and Granville's daughter Elvira (Cephas Thompson's granddaughter) married James Mason Hutchings, an early promoter of Yosemite National Park.

Although Thompson lived most of his life in Middleborough, he produced portraits at several locations in southeastern New England. From 1800 to 1825, he made many seasonal trips to the south to paint in Baltimore, Alexandria, Norfolk, Charleston, Philadelphia, New Orleans, and Georgia. Between 1805 and 1821, Thompson also paid five extended visits to Bristol, Rhode Island, where he painted over 132 portraits of merchants, ship-owners, sea captains, and their wives and children. Approximately 65% of Thompson's Bristol sitters derived wealth from their head-of-households' participation in the African-Caribbean-Carolina slave-trade. In April 1817, Thompson advertised his presence in Providence, Rhode Island, where he intended to paint portraits "in the Hall of Blake's Hotel". Thompson may well have painted portraits in Providence during this visit; but none has yet been identified. At about age 50, Thompson retired from itinerant painting to reside year-round on his Middleborough farm.

Among Cephas Thompson's portrait subjects are John Marshall, Stephen Decatur, David Ramsay of South Carolina, John Howard Payne, Elizabeth Wirt, James DeWolf, and George Washington Parke Custis, who was his pupil. As Deborah Sisum has noted and Keith Arbour has extensively documented, the most important patrons of Thompson's early career were members of the DeWolf family of Bristol, Rhode Island. The largest collection of Thompson's work is in the Boston Athenæum, which also holds some of the artist's papers. Portraits by Thompson are also in the Metropolitan Museum of Art, the Milwaukee Art Museum, the Rhode Island School of Design Museum, the Abby Aldrich Rockefeller Folk Art Museum, Linden Place Museum, the Bristol Historical and Preservation Society and the Newport Historical Society. Many of his portraits are on exhibit at the Middleborough Historical Museum. The amateur historian George Decas, devoted chapters 16 and 17 of his biography of Col. Peter Peirce to Cephas Thompson.

Local historian James Blachowicz has shown that from about 1788 to 1805 Cephas Thompson engraved over 50 slate gravestones near his Middleborough home. One of these stones, for Robert Strobredge (d. 1790) in the Thompson Hill cemetery in Lakeville is signed "Cephas Tomson, sculpt". Blachowicz suggests that Thompson may have taken up this distinct art because of a kinship connection with Middleborough attorney and state senator Isaac Thompson (1746–1819), whose own relations included at least 8 gravestone carvers. Isaac Thompson was Cephas's uncle-by-marriage, that is, Cephas's mother Deborah's sister Lucy Sturtevant's husband. For additional details see James Blachowicz, From Slate to Marble: Gravestone Carving Traditions in Eastern Massachusetts, 1770–1870 (Graver Press, 2006), pp. 91–93.
