= Joseph Mechlin Jr. =

Joseph Mechlin Jr. (died 1839) was an American medical doctor and colonial agent of the American Colonization Society in Liberia two times. He completed his M.D. degree at the University of Pennsylvania Medical School in 1827.
