= 1893 Liberian general election =

- 1893
- Presidential election
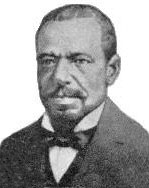

Nominee	Joseph James Cheeseman	Anthony D. Williams Jr.
Party	TWP	New Republican
President before election
Joseph James Cheeseman
TWP
Elected President
Joseph James Cheeseman
TWP

General elections were held in Liberia in 1893. In the presidential election, incumbent Joseph James Cheeseman of the True Whig Party was re-elected for a second term, defeating Anthony D. Williams Jr., who ran on the New Republican Party ticket.
