= A. A. B. Williams =

South African engineer

- Born: 1926; Kokstad, South Africa
- Died: 4 February 2016 (aged 89–90); Johannesburg, South Africa
- Education: University of the Witwatersrand

A. A. B. "Tony" Williams (1926 - 4 February 2016) was a South African civil engineer with the National Building Research Institute and Council for Scientific and Industrial Research. His primary contribution to geotechnical engineering practice was co-authoring the Revised guide to soil profiling for civil engineering projects in Southern Africa.

== Background ==
Williams was born in 1926 in Kokstad and attended primary and high school in the Natal Midlands. After school, he served aboard a frigate on the Burma coast during World War II. After the war he completed a BSc in Civil Engineering at the University of the Witwatersrand graduating in 1948.

Williams spent three years working for the then Transvaal Roads Department on road and bridge construction before returning to study at Imperial College, London. He completed a Diploma in Soil Mechanics in 1953. Upon his return to South Africa in 1954, he started working at the National Building Research Institute (NBRI) where he worked under the directorship of Jere Jennings and Tony Brink.

Williams spent 35 years working for NBRI, which later became part of the Council for Scientific and Industrial Research (CSIR). His roles included heading up the Soil Mechanics Division of the National Institute for Road Research and Heading up the Structural and Geotechnical Engineering Division at the CSIR. During this period he also completed his PhD at the University of the Witwatersrand in 1978.

Williams retired from the CSIR in 1989 to become an active consultant, before retiring a second time in 1993 to spend time with his family. He was married to Veronica and they had four children. He died in Johannesburg on 4 February 2016.

== Contributions and award ==
Williams co-authored the 1973 Revised guide to soil profiling for civil engineering projects in Southern Africa with Jere Jennings and Tony Brink. This work was extended in the 1982 book Soil survey for engineering co-authored with Tony Brink and Tim Partridge.

Williams, Terry Pidgeon and Peter Day also collaborated on a 1985 paper on expansive clays. This was key to highlighting that the shear strength along existing slickensides was close to the residual strength (about 50% of the peak strength). This has importance for South African slopes assessment, in contrast to the common overseas practice of using peak strength for analysing ‘first time’ slides.

Williams received the South African Institution of Civil Engineering (SAICE) Best Paper Award in 1962 (with Basil Kantey), the JD Roberts Award for Building Research in 1980, the South African Geotechnical Medal in 1991, and the Gold Medal of the South African Institute for Engineering and Environmental Geologists (SAIEG) in 2005.

Williams was a Fellow of SAICE, serving on Council, the committees of the Pretoria Branch and Geotechnical Division, as well as assisting with the organising committees of several Regional Conferences for Africa on Soil Mechanics and Foundation Engineering.
