= William Wirt (attorney general) =

American author and politician (1772–1834)

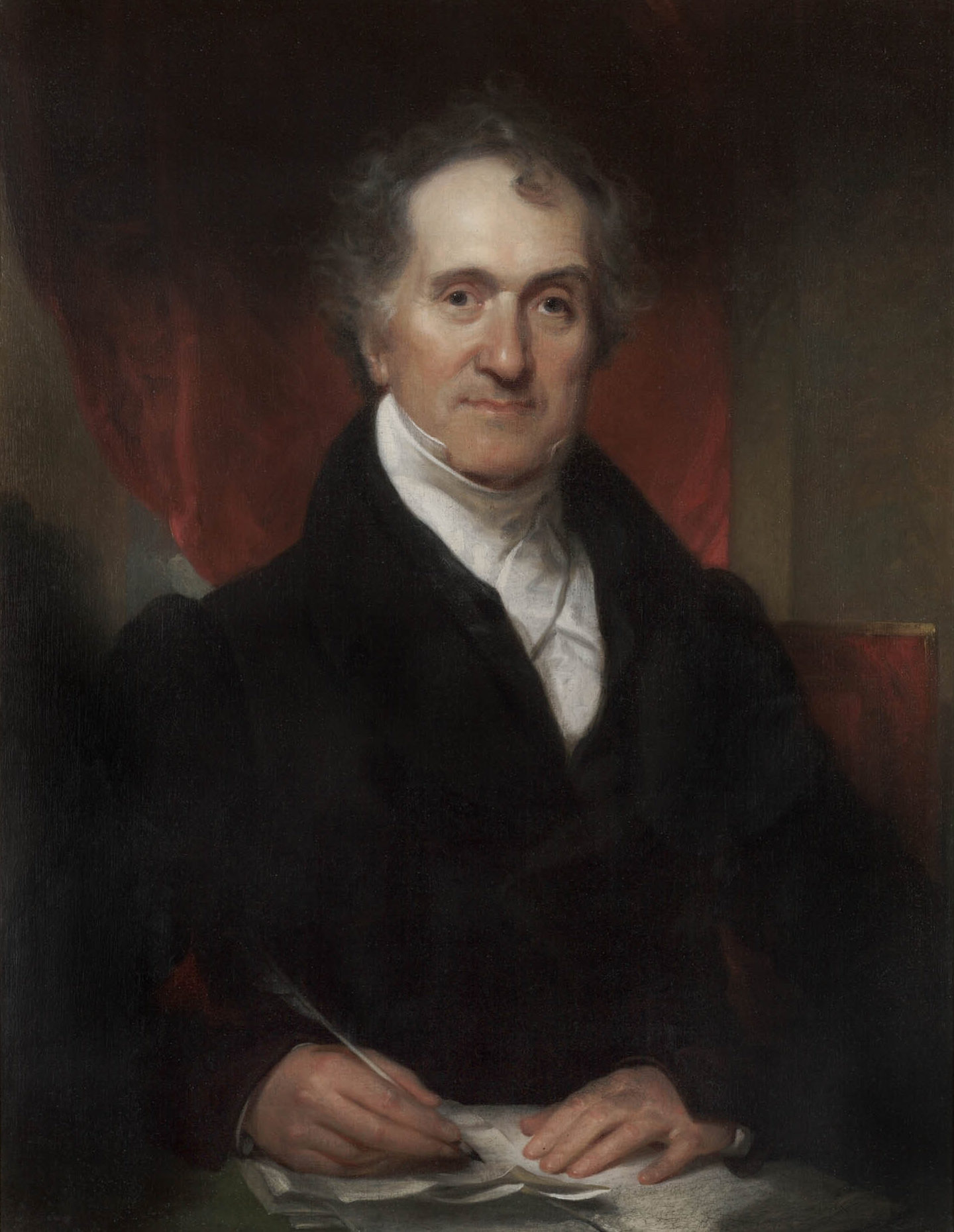
- Portrait c. 1832

9th United States Attorney General
- In office November 13, 1817 – March 4, 1829
- President: James Monroe; John Quincy Adams
- Preceded by: Richard Rush
- Succeeded by: John M. Berrien

United States Attorney for the District of Virginia
- In office 1816–1817
- President: James Madison; James Monroe
- Preceded by: George Hay
- Succeeded by: Robert Stanard

Member of the Virginia House of Delegates from Richmond City
- In office December 5, 1808 – December 4, 1809
- Preceded by: John Foushee
- Succeeded by: Andrew Stevenson

6th Clerk of the Virginia House of Delegates
- In office December 2, 1799 – December 6, 1802
- Preceded by: John Stewart
- Succeeded by: James Pleasants

Personal details
- Born: November 8, 1772 Bladensburg, Maryland, British America
- Died: February 18, 1834 (aged 61) Washington, D.C., U.S.
- Party: Democratic-Republican (before 1825); Anti-Masonic (1832–1834)
- Spouse(s): Mildred Gilmer (m. 1795; died 1799) Elizabeth Washington Gamble (m. 1802)
- Children: 12
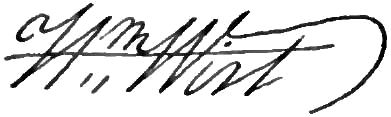
- Signature

William Wirt (November 8, 1772 – February 18, 1834) was an American lawyer, politician and author who is credited with turning the position of United States Attorney General into one of influence. The longest-serving attorney general in U.S. history, Wirt also served in the Virginia House of Delegates and was the Anti-Masonic nominee for president in the 1832 election.

Orphaned as a child, Wirt grew up in Maryland but initially pursued a legal career in Virginia, passing the Virginia bar in 1792. After holding various positions, he served as the prosecutor in Aaron Burr's trial for treason. Wirt won election to the Virginia House of Delegates in 1808 and was appointed as a United States Attorney in 1816. The following year, President James Monroe appointed him to the position of United States Attorney General. Wirt remained in that office for the next twelve years, serving under Monroe and John Quincy Adams. He continued his law career after leaving office, primarily in Maryland, and may be best known for representing the Cherokee in Cherokee Nation v. Georgia.

Though Wirt was a former Freemason, the Anti-Masonic Party nominated him for president in 1832. Wirt did not actively campaign for office and refused to publicly speak against Masonry. Nonetheless, the ticket of Wirt and Amos Ellmaker carried the state of Vermont, becoming the first third party presidential ticket to win a state. After the election, Wirt continued to practice law until his death in 1834.

== Early life and education ==
William Wirt was born in Bladensburg, Maryland, to a German mother, Henrietta, and a Swiss German father, Jacob Wirt. He had a sister, Catherine, who would marry James Johnston, and their daughter would marry Dabney Minor, a Virginia planter and politician. Meanwhile, both parents died before Wirt was eight years old, so their uncle, Jasper Wirt, became their guardian. Between his seventh and his eleventh year Wirt was sent to several classical schools and finally to one kept by the Reverend James Hunt in Montgomery County, where he received over the course of four years the chief part of his education. For two years he boarded with Hunt, in whose library he spent much of his time, reading with a keen and indiscriminate appetite. In his 15th year the school was disbanded, by which time Wirt's inheritance was nearly exhausted.

Ninian Edwards (later governor of Illinois) had been Wirt's schoolmate, and Edwards's father, Benjamin Edwards (later a member of Congress from Maryland), thought Wirt had more than ordinary natural ability and invited him to reside with his family as tutor to Ninian and two nephews, offering him also the use of his library for his own studies. Wirt accepted the offer and stayed twenty months, teaching, pursuing his own classical and historical studies, writing, and preparing for the bar.

=== Career ===
Wirt was admitted to the Virginia bar in 1792, and he began practice at Culpeper Courthouse. Wirt had the advantages of a vigorous constitution and a good carriage, but the drawbacks of meager legal equipment, constitutional shyness, and brusque and indistinct speech.

In 1795, he married Mildred, daughter of Dr. George Gilmer, a friend of Thomas Jefferson (as well as his physician and a planter in his own right). They moved to Pen Park, where Gilmer lived near Charlottesville. Wirt renamed the plantation "Rose Hill" (one of several Virginia plantations of the same name), and also had a law office in Charlottesville. Wirt socialized with many of Jefferson's other associates, including James Monroe. For a time, Wirt took advantage of the hospitality of the country gentlemen and the convivial habits of the members of the bar so that he was regarded by other attorneys as a bon vivant, a fascinating, cheerful, and lively companion, rather than as an ambitious lawyer.

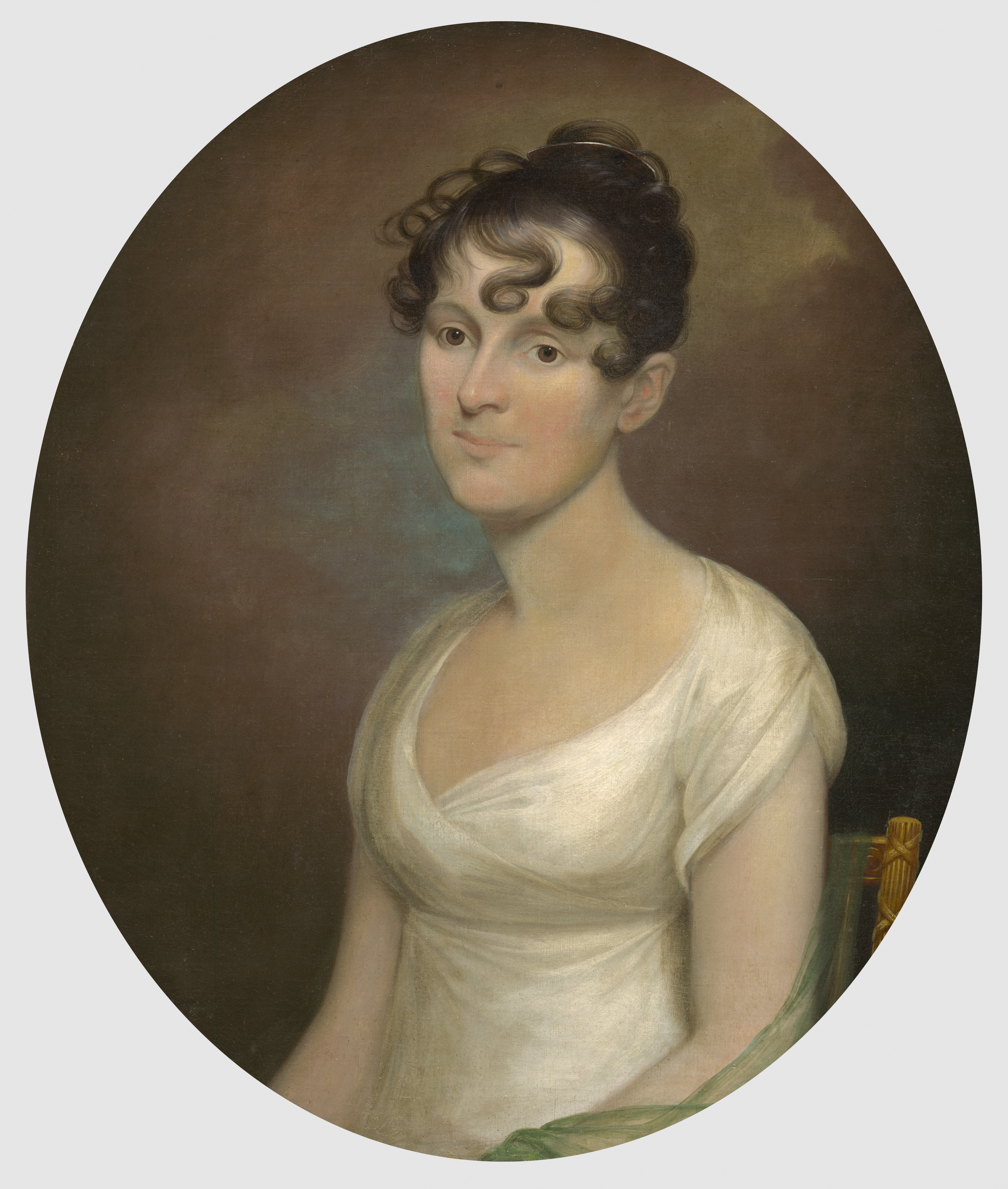
Portrait of Elizabeth Wirt, painted c. 1809–10 by Cephas Thompson

In 1799 his wife died, and Wirt moved to Richmond, where he became clerk of the Virginia House of Delegates. Legislators elected him as chancellor for the Eastern District of Virginia, although he resigned after six months. In 1800 Wirt also was one of the co-counsel defending James Callender, a Jefferson associate and later critic, who was prosecuted under the Alien and Sedition Acts of 1798. In 1802, Wirt married Elizabeth Washington Gamble, the daughter of Colonel Robert Gamble of Richmond. In the winter of 1803/04, Wirt moved to Norfolk, but in 1806, wishing for a wider field of practice, returned to Richmond.

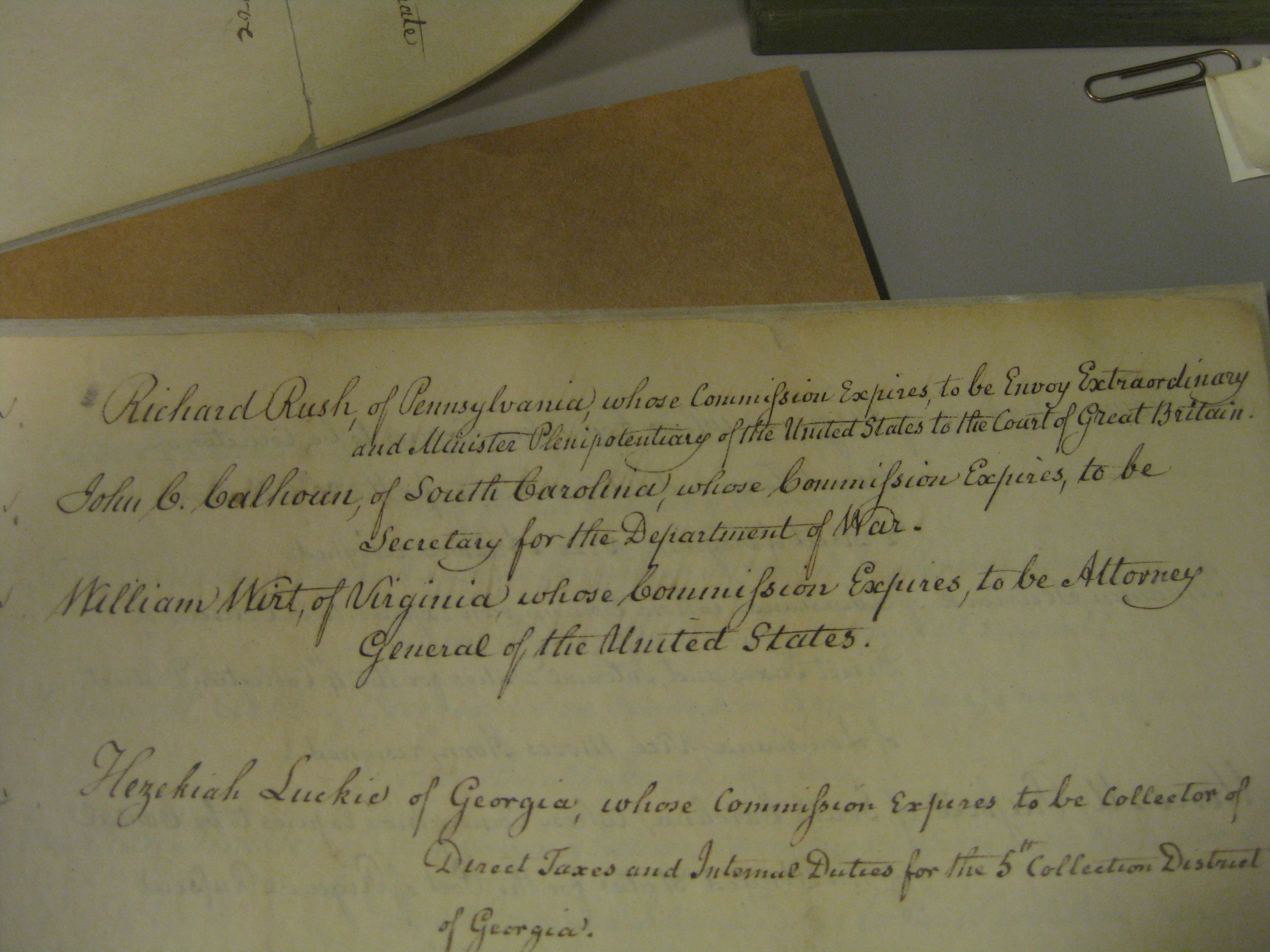
Wirt's Attorney General nomination

In 1807, President Thomas Jefferson asked Wirt to serve as the prosecutor in Aaron Burr's trial for treason. His principal speech, four hours in length, was characterized by eloquent appeal, polished wit, and logical reasoning. It greatly extended his fame. The passage in which he depicted in glowing colors the home of Harman Blennerhassett and "the wife of his bosom, whom he lately permitted not the winds of summer 'to visit too roughly'", as "shivering at midnight on the wintry banks of the Ohio, and mingling her tears with the torrents that froze as they fell", was for many years a favorite piece for academic declamation. Wirt was nicknamed the "Whip Syllabub Genius" by his enemies for the frothy, over-the-top nature of his oratory.

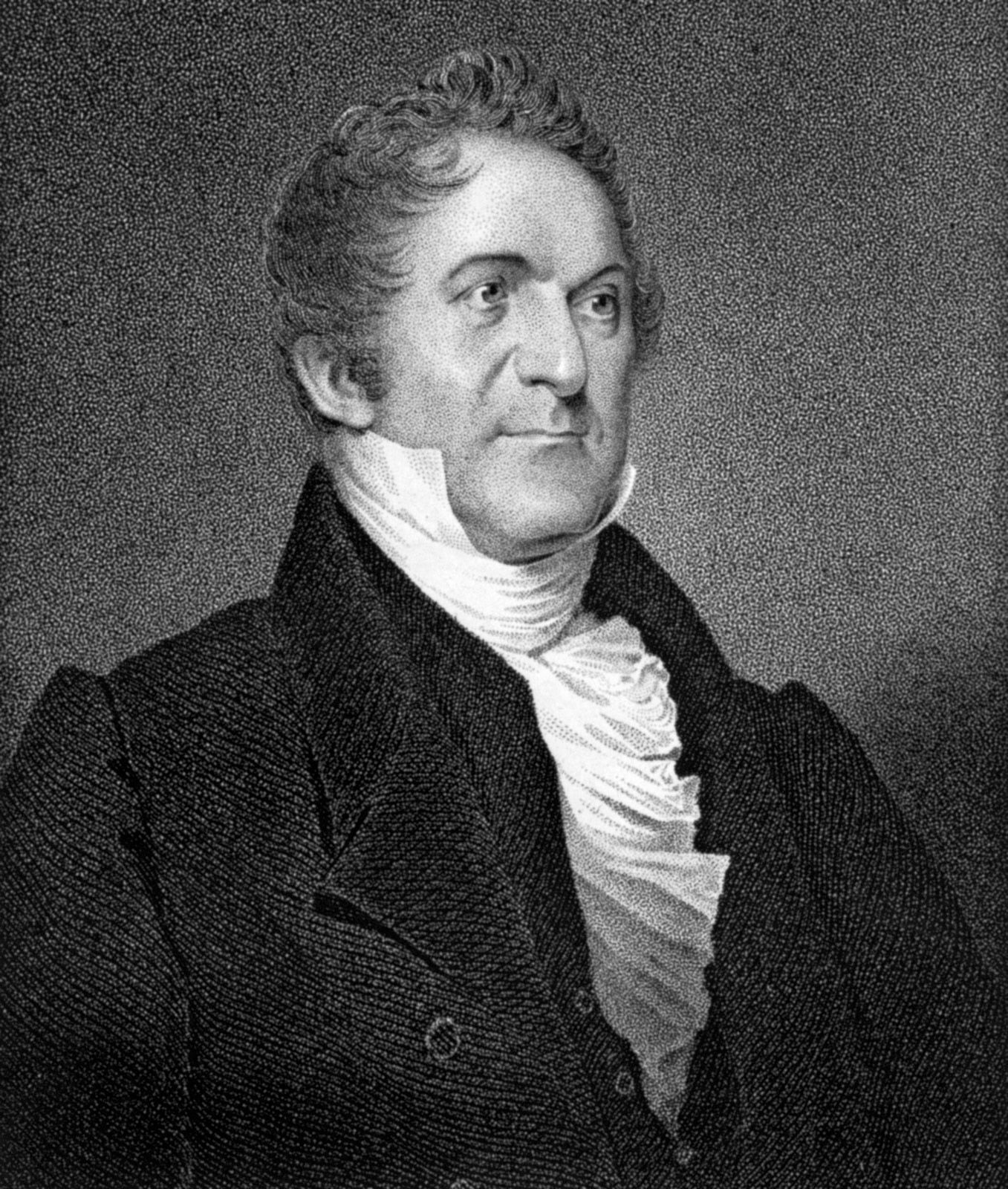
Engraving of Wirt between c. 1810–34 by James Barton Longacre.

=== Virginia politician ===
In 1808, Richmond voters elected Wirt as their representative to the Virginia House of Delegates (a part-time position). In 1814, he sought election to the U.S. Senate, but Virginia legislators instead elected James Barbour. In 1816, Wirt accepted an appointment as U.S. Attorney for the District of Virginia.

=== U.S. Attorney General ===
In 1817 President James Monroe named Wirt as the ninth Attorney General of the United States, and after confirmation by the U.S. Senate, Wirt held that position for more than 11 years, through the administration of John Quincy Adams, until 1829. William Wirt has the record for the longest tenure in history of any U.S. attorney general.

In 1824, Attorney General Wirt argued for the United States against Daniel Webster in Gibbons v. Ogden that the federal patent laws preempted New York State's patent grant to steamboat inventor Robert Fulton's successor, Aaron Ogden, of the exclusive right to operate a steamboat between New York and New Jersey in the Hudson River. Wirt argued "that a power in the States to grant exclusive patents, is utterly inconsistent with the power given to the national government to grant such exclusive patents: and hence, that the power given to Congress is one which is exclusive from its nature." Although the Gibbons Court declined to decide the question, 140 years later the Supreme Court confirmed Wirt's view in Sears, Roebuck & Co. v. Stiffel Co.

=== Supreme Court cases involving Cherokee Nation ===
After leaving his position as attorney general, Wirt settled in Baltimore, Maryland, which had been the core of his legal practice.

In June 1830, a delegation of Cherokee led by Chief John Ross selected Wirt on the urging of Senators Webster and Frelinghuysen to defend Cherokee rights before the U.S. Supreme Court. Wirt argued, in Cherokee Nation v. Georgia, that the Cherokee Nation was "a foreign nation in the sense of our constitution and law" and was therefore not subject to Georgia's jurisdiction. Wirt asked the Supreme Court to void all Georgia laws extended over Cherokee territory on the grounds that they violated the U.S. Constitution, United States–Cherokee treaties, and United States intercourse laws. Although the Court determined that it did not have original jurisdiction in this case, the Court held open the possibility that it yet might rule in favor of the Cherokee. Wirt therefore waited for a test case to again resolve the constitutionality of the laws of Georgia. On March 1, 1831, Georgia passed a law aimed at evicting missionaries, who were perceived as encouraging the Cherokee resistance to removal from Cherokee lands. The American Board of Commissioners for Foreign Missions, an interdenominational missionary organization, hired Wirt to challenge the new law. On March 3, 1832, the decision in Worcester v. Georgia, authored by Chief Justice John Marshall, held that the Cherokee Nation was "a distinct community, occupying its own territory, with boundaries accurately described, in which the laws of Georgia can have no force, and which the citizens of Georgia have no right to enter but with the assent of the Cherokees themselves or in conformity with treaties and with the acts of Congress".

=== Anti-Masonic Party presidential nomination ===
Wirt became a candidate for president in 1832, nominated by the Anti-Masonic Party. This party held the first ever national nominating convention in U.S. history on September 11, 1830, in Philadelphia establishing the tradition. The date was chosen to commemorate the fourth anniversary of the Morgan Affair. However, no candidate was agreed upon. The actual nomination occurred a year later during the second convention in Baltimore. On September 28, 1831, Wirt became a presidential candidate after the fifth ballot. Amos Ellmaker became his running mate. Wirt is the only person from Maryland to ever become a presidential candidate who won any electoral votes.

Wirt was, in fact, a former Freemason. He had taken the first two degrees of Freemasonry in Jerusalem Lodge #54 Richmond, Virginia becoming a fellow craft, or second degree, mason. Wirt wrote in his acceptance letter to the nominating convention that he found Freemasonry unobjectionable and that in his experience many Masons were "intelligent men of high and honourable character" who would never choose Freemasonry above "their duties to their God and country".

Historian William Vaughn wrote, "Wirt was possibly the most reluctant and most unwilling presidential candidate ever nominated by an American party.' After being selected Wirt started to regret his nomination and distanced himself from actual campaigning. He admitted later, "In the canvass I took no part, not even by writing private letters, which, on the contrary, I refused to answer whenever such answers could be interpreted into canvassing for office." In private conversations Wirt criticized Masonry for alleged intent to create international order ruled from Europe, but refused all Antimasonic attempts to make his sentiments public. He hoped for enthusiastic national support to an electoral alliance between Anti-Masons and National Republicans that would overpower the Jacksonian Democrats. When his expectations did not materialize, he wrote in frustration about his presidential aspirations: "What the use ... it neither breaks my leg nor picks my pocket." In the election, Wirt carried Vermont with seven electoral votes, becoming the first candidate of an organized third party to carry a state, and he remains the only presidential candidate so successful who came from Maryland. When The Providence American newspaper suggested that Wirt could run again in 1836, he quickly declined.

In 1833, Wirt became involved with his son-in-law in establishing a German immigrant colony in Florida on lands that he bought but never inspected personally; this business venture failed.

=== Societies ===
During the 1820s, Wirt was a member of the Columbian Institute for the Promotion of Arts and Sciences, which included as members former presidents Andrew Jackson and John Quincy Adams and many prominent men of the day, including well-known representatives of the military, government service, medical and other professions. A devout Presbyterian, Wirt was also president for many years of the Maryland Bible Society.

Wirt was also an honorary member of the American Whig–Cliosophic Society and associated with the Delphian Club.

== Personal life ==
As mentioned above, Wirt married twice. His first wife, the former Mildred Gilmer, died in 1799, prompting his move to Richmond. In 1802 he married his second wife (and widow), the former Elizabeth Washington Gamble (1784–1857). She later published a book about flowers and died in Annapolis, Maryland at the home of her son in law, then was ultimately buried beside Wirt in the Congressional Cemetery. Wirt fathered twelve children. Of their three sons who survived to adulthood, two became medical doctors, including his namesake Dr. William Wirt (Jr.)(1815–1899; who married and practiced in Westmoreland County, Virginia) and Dr. Henry Grattan Wirt (1818–1850; who moved to Jefferson County, Florida). The middle son, Dabney Carr Wirt (1817–1893), trained as a lawyer, but spent most of his life as a farmer in Westmoreland County, naming his plantation "Wirtland" and briefly serving as a corporal in the Confederate States Army, and ultimately dying while visiting Tampa, Florida.

According to the federal census, Wirt owned 5 enslaved people when he lived in Washington D.C. in 1820. A decade later, Wirt, by then living in Baltimore and supporting 21 other people in his household, owned 10 enslaved people.

== Death and legacy ==
Wirt suffered several infirmities but continued to practice law, making Baltimore, Maryland the base of his operations during the last decade of his life, although he did not formally move into the city until 1832. On February 8, 1834, while attending the proceedings of the Supreme Court in Washington, D.C., Wirt fell ill. His biographer John P. Kennedy wrote that the early diagnosis of a cold was followed by identifying the symptoms of erysipelas (sometimes known as St. Anthony's fire). He died on February 18, 1834.

Wirt's last rites were attended by President Jackson and members of his cabinet; John Quincy Adams read a eulogy address in the House of Representatives. William Wirt was buried in Congressional Cemetery in Washington, D.C.

Many of his letters are held by the Library of Virginia.

=== Historic house ===
The house Wirt occupied in Richmond from 1816 to 1818, known as the Hancock-Wirt-Caskie House, was listed on the National Register of Historic Places in 1970.

=== Grave robbery ===
In the early 2000s, after a series of mysterious phone calls to Congressional Cemetery in Washington D.C., it was discovered that in the 1970s someone had broken into the Wirt Tomb and stolen Wirt's skull. After the skull was recovered from the house of a historical memorabilia collector, Robert L. White, it spent time in D.C. Council member Jim Graham's office while he tried to get it returned to its rightful crypt. Finally in 2005 investigators from the Smithsonian Institution were able to determine the skull (which had gold block letters saying "Hon. Wm. Wirt" painted on the tin box containing it) was indeed his and had it returned.

== Published works ==
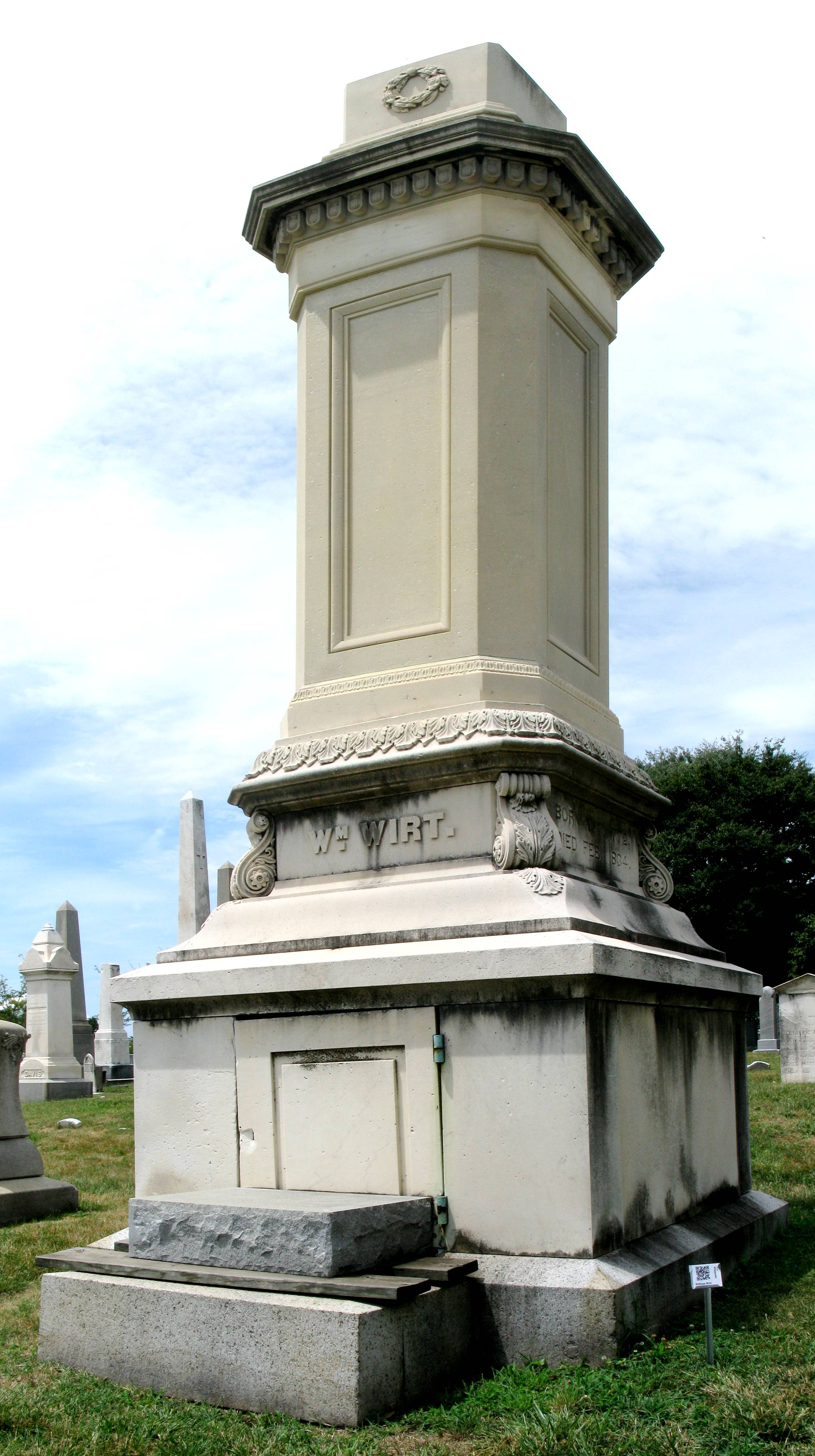
William Wirt Monument, Congressional Cemetery, Washington D.C.

Wirt's earliest work was Letters of the British Spy, which he first contributed to the Richmond Argus in 1803, and which won immediate popularity. The letters are chiefly studies of eloquence and eloquent men, are written in a vivid and luxuriant style, and may be regarded, in spite of the exceptional excellence of "The Blind Preacher", as rather a prophecy of literary skill than its fulfilment. They were soon afterward issued in book form (Richmond, 1803; 10th ed., with a biographical sketch of the author by Peter H. Cruse, New York, 1832).

In 1808, Wirt wrote for the Richmond Enquirer essays entitled The Rainbow, and in 1810, with Dabney Carr, George Tucker, and others, a series of didactic and ethical essays, entitled The Old Bachelor, which, collected, passed through several editions (2 vols., 1812). These papers treat of female education, Virginian manners, the fine arts, and especially oratory. An essay from this collection, "Eloquence of the Pulpit", a vigorous and passionate protest against coldness in this genre, has been singled out for praise.

In October 1826, Wirt delivered before the citizens of Washington a discourse on the lives and characters of the ex-presidents John Adams and Thomas Jefferson, who had died on 4 July of the same year (Washington, 1826). The London Quarterly Review, in a paper on American oratory several years afterward, pronounced this discourse "the best which this remarkable coincidence has called forth". In 1830 Wirt delivered an address to the literary societies of Rutgers College, which, after its publication by the students (New Brunswick, 1830), was republished in England, and translated into French and German.

His other publications are:

- The Two Principal Arguments in the Trial of Aaron Burr (Richmond, 1808)
- Sketches of the Life and Character of Patrick Henry (Philadelphia, 1817) This work has been severely criticized both for its hero worship and its style, the subject of the biography having been regarded by many as a creation of Wirt rather than Patrick Henry. The book contained the supposed text of some of Henry's speeches, many of which had never been published. Some historians have since speculated that some of Henry's phrases that have since become famous, such as "Give me Liberty or give me Death!", were fabricated by Wirt for this book. Even Wirt's contemporary Thomas Jefferson shelved his copy of the biography under fiction.
- Address on the Triumph of Liberty in France (Baltimore, 1830)
- Letters by John Q. Adams and William Wirt to the Anti-Masonic Committee for York County (Boston, 1831)

Wirt had the distinction of being regarded for many years as the chief man of letters in the South.

== Major cases argued ==
- Gibbons v. Ogden
- McCulloch v. Maryland
- Cherokee Nation v. Georgia
- Worcester v. Georgia

Legal offices
Preceded by Richard Rush	United States Attorney General; 1817–1829	Succeeded by John M. Berrien
Party political offices
New political party	Anti-Masonic nominee for President of the United States; 1832	Succeeded by William Henry Harrison; Endorsed
