= 1891 Liberian general election =

- 1891
- Presidential election
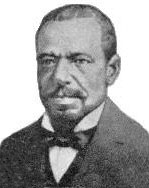

Nominee	Joseph James Cheeseman	Anthony D. Williams Jr.
Party	TWP	New Republican
President before election
Hilary R. W. Johnson
TWP
Elected President
Joseph James Cheeseman
TWP

General elections were held in Liberia in 1891. In the presidential election, the result was a victory for Joseph James Cheeseman of the True Whig Party, who defeated former Secretary of War and Navy Anthony D. Williams Jr., who ran on the New Republican Party ticket.

Cheeseman took office on 4 January 1892.
