= Elizabeth Wirt =

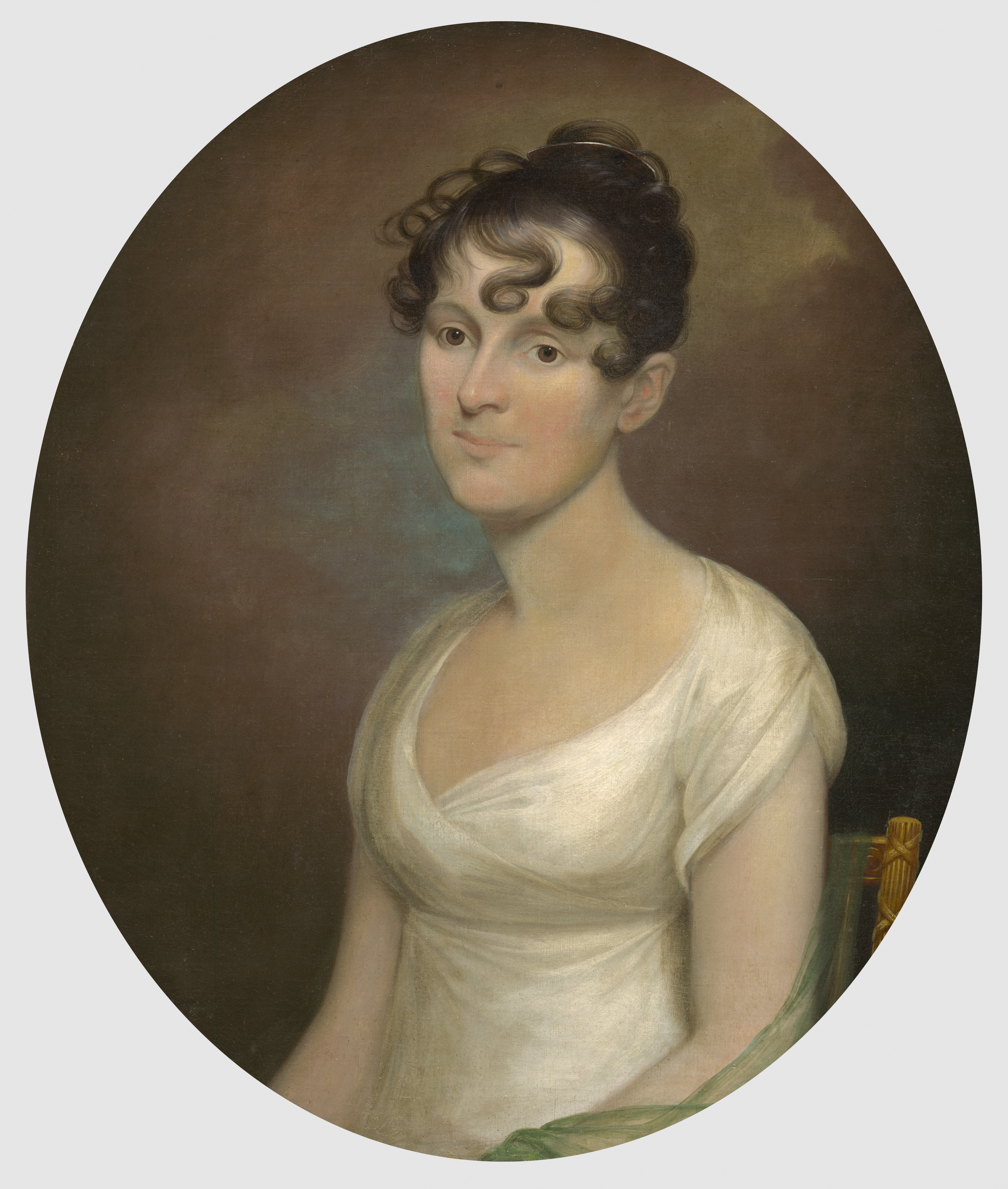
Portrait of Elizabeth Wirt, painted ca. 1809–10 by Cephas Thompson. Collection of the National Portrait Gallery, Smithsonian Institution.

Elizabeth Washington Wirt (née Gamble; January 30, 1784 – January 24, 1857), who published under the name E. W. Wirt, was a 19th-century American author whose Flora's Dictionary was the first book to broadly popularize the concept of a language of flowers for American readers.

== Education and family ==
Elizabeth Washington Gamble was born in Richmond, Virginia, on January 30, 1784, to Colonel Robert Gamble and Catherine Grattan Gamble. She was educated at a female seminary, probably acquiring a knowledge of Latin that would prove useful later when she turned to authorship. In 1802, she became the second wife of William Wirt, a future attorney-general of the United States. During their marriage, Elizabeth ran the household and also managed most business affairs related to their properties. The Wirts lived in Virginia and Washington, D.C., and after Elizabeth was widowed in 1834, she moved to Florida. She died in Annapolis, Maryland on January 24, 1857.

== Authorship ==
For the entertainment of her family—the Wirts had ten surviving children—Elizabeth Wirt began working on a dictionary of flowers. She sought contributions of "prose and verse [which were] furnished, to a considerable extent, by a number of young gentlemen [who were] friends of the family. Among these were [Dr. Richard Randall], the celebrated Rufus Choate and Salmon P. Chase, [the last two of whom] were then reading law in Mr. Wirt’s office..." On request, she made copies for her friends, and eventually she decided to publish it, prompted in part by her inability to keep up with demand for copies. She was also spurred on by the fact that a Boston press had already published an unauthorized version, though she praised it as one of great "neatness and beauty".

The main text of Flora's Dictionary is an alphabetical list of over 200 flowers from acacia rose to zinnia, each with their scientific names, their traditional symbolic meanings (for example, red clover means industry), and a selection of verse featuring the flower in question. This is bookended by sections focusing on scientific aspects of the subject. At the front of the book are two long notes, one on the "structure of plants" and the other on "flowers"; together, they give a clear and quite extensive introduction to plant morphology and the Linnean system of botanical nomenclature as they were understood at the time. At the end is a section of botanical and historical notes: a detailed description of each species and its geographical distribution together with information on how the flower got its name. This is followed by an alphabetical glossary of botanical terms—many of which were explained in the prefatory note—and a list of the meanings of the plants' Latin genus and species names. There are also a list of the flowers associated with Catholic saints (organized calendrically, by month and day of the year) and an index of symbolic meanings, from absence (zinnia) to youthful love (red catch fly).

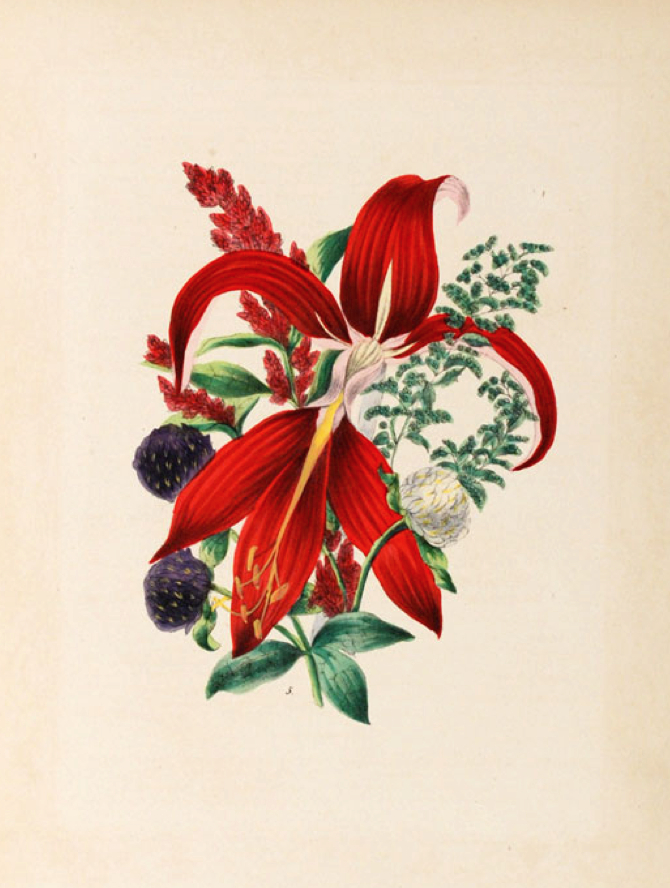
Chromolithograph of assorted flowers, after a watercolor attributed to Miss Ann Smith, in Elizabeth Wirt's Flora's Dictionary, edition of 1855.

Flora's Dictionary was first published in 1829, with the authorship being credited simply to "a Lady". The book was exceedingly popular, going through several reprintings before, in 1835, Wirt was finally credited as the author under the byline "Mrs. E. W. Wirt of Virginia". Early editions had no illustrations apart from black-and-white wood-engraved borders around the text, but starting in 1837 a few had varying numbers of colored plates that are implicitly attributed to a Miss Ann Smith. The most lavish of these is an 1855 edition with 56 hand-colored, uncaptioned lithographic plates showing informal mixed bouquets that were said by the publisher to illustrate all of the flowers in the book. Some editions also included interleaved pages of blank paper stock in different colors, ranging from cream and yellow to pink and blue, which one historian takes to be an implicit invitation to readers to make their own contributions to the dictionary, either in the form of written emendations or by pressing plant specimens.

Wirt's was one of the first two floriographical dictionaries in early 19th century America; the other was Dorothea Dix's The Garland of Flora, which was issued in the same year as the first authorized edition of Flora's Dictionary. However, Dix's work was less comprehensive and did not sell well, whereas Flora's Dictionary was "a phenomenal success". Wirt's book dominated the field until a wide variety of similar books started appearing in the 1840s, often edited by prominent women like Frances Sargent Osgood. Wirt distinguished herself from her competitors by a much greater concern for the scientific aspects of her subject, as indicated by her wide-ranging prefatory and end notes on botany.

A portrait of Wirt by Cephas Thompson, painted around 1809-10, is in the collection of the Smithsonian Institution's National Portrait Gallery. There are collections of the voluminous correspondence between Elizabeth and William Wirt at the University of North Carolina, Duke University, and the Virginia Historical Society.
