= Anthony Williams (criminal) =

British embezzler

Anthony Williams, self-styled as Lord Williams of Tomintoul and known as the Laird of Tomintoul, is a British accountant and convicted fraudster.

Whilst employed as a finance officer at the Metropolitan Police in London, Williams embezzled over £5 million and used it to buy property in the Scottish village of Tomintoul and the title the Baron of Chirnside. In 1995, he was sentenced to seven and a half years in prison. His life and crimes have been the subject of a documentary on BBC Scotland. According to some residents of Tomintoul, Williams' investments in the town had large positive effects on its economy.

According to a November 2023 BBC News article, Williams' current status is unclear, and his age would be 83.
